= List of presidents of Bolivia =

The president of Bolivia is the head of state and head of government of Bolivia, directly elected to a five-year term by the Bolivian people. The officeholder leads the executive branch of the government and is the captain general of the Armed Forces of Bolivia.

Since the office was established in 1825, 66 men and 2 women have served as president. The first president, Simón Bolívar, was elected by the General Assembly of Deputies of The Royal Audiencia of Charcas. For purposes of numbering, members of jointly-ruling juntas and other governing bodies are not included in the official count of presidents, unless one member later assumed the presidency in their own right. Three presidents: Antonio José de Sucre, Germán Busch, and Hernán Siles Zuazo became, after a brief, non-consecutive, interim exercise of power, presidents for longer terms later. In these cases, they are numbered according to that second term. Therefore, Busch is counted as the 36th president, not the 35th, Siles Zuazo as the 46th instead of the 45th, etc.

The presidency of Pedro Blanco Soto, who was assassinated six days after taking office in 1828, was the shortest in Bolivian history. Evo Morales served the longest, over thirteen years, before resigning in 2019. He is the only president to have served more than two consecutive terms. José Miguel de Velasco and Víctor Paz Estenssoro each served for four terms. However, all of Velasco's were non-consecutive and two were in an acting capacity while Paz Estenssoro only served twice consecutively in 1960 and 1964.

Three presidents died in office, one of natural causes and two through tragic circumstances (Adolfo Ballivián, Germán Busch, and René Barrientos). Additionally, Manuel Antonio Sánchez and Pedro José de Guerra died of natural causes while exercising provisional presidential functions. Two were assassinated (Pedro Blanco Soto, Agustín Morales) while nine former presidents were assassinated after leaving office (Antonio José de Sucre, Eusebio Guilarte, Manuel Isidoro Belzu, Jorge Córdova, Mariano Melgarejo, Hilarión Daza, José Manuel Pando, and Juan José Torres and Gualberto Villarroel who had resigned mere hours before his death).

Five vice presidents have assumed the presidency during a presidential term (José Luis Tejada Sorzano, Mamerto Urriolagoitía, Luis Adolfo Siles Salinas, Jorge Quiroga, and Carlos Mesa). Tejada Sorzano was the first to do so in 1934 while Quiroga was the only one to complete the term of their predecessor (Tejada Sorzano extended his mandate past the term of his predecessor).

Bolivia has had a volatile history of coups d'état, 23 of which have resulted in the deposition of 22 presidents (1839, 1841; twice, 1848; twice, 1857, 1861, 1864, 1871, 1876, 1879, 1920, 1936, 1937, 1943, 1964, 1969, 1970, 1971, 1978; twice, 1979, and 1980). Velasco was deposed twice in 1841 and December 1848. Additionally, the Council of Ministers of Hernando Siles Reyes was deposed in 1930. Three presidents were deposed by a civil war, a popular uprising, and a revolution. Transmissions of command from one de facto government to another de facto government occurred in seven cases (1841, 1946, 1965, 1966, 1981; twice, and 1982). Two special cases occurred in 1939 when Carlos Quintanilla was installed by the military after the death of Germán Busch and in 1951 when President Mamerto Urriolagoitía resigned in a self-coup in favor of a military junta. Two unconstitutional successions occurred in 1930 when Hernando Siles Reyes entrusted command to his council of ministers and 1934 when Daniel Salamanca was ousted in favor of his vice president, José Luis Tejada Sorzano. Finally, some supporters of Evo Morales claim that he was ousted by a coup d'état and that the presidency of Jeanine Áñez was an unconstitutional succession of power. However, this is disputed.

There are seven living former presidents. The most recent to die was Luis García Meza, on 29 April 2018.

Víctor Paz Estenssoro, Jaime Paz Zamora and Rodrigo Paz Pereira are related.

== Presidents ==
=== The Royal Audience of Charcas, or Republic of Bolivar (1825–1826) ===
Heads of state of The Royal Audience of Charcas, or Republic of Bolívar (1825–1826)
No. (Note: Presidents are numbered according to first period served by the same person. For example, Ismael Montes served two nonconsecutive terms and is counted as the twenty-sixth president (not the twenty-sixth and twenty-eighth).)	Portrait	President	Took office	Left office	Duration	Party	Election	Ref. and Notes
–		José Mariano Serrano (1788–1852); Acting	6 August 1825	11 August 1825	5 days	Independent	–	(Note: Maximum authority of the country until the arrival of Bolívar.)
–		Antonio José de Sucre (1795–1830); Acting	11 August 1825	12 August 1825	1 day	Independent	–	(Note: Exerts command pending the arrival of the president-designate.)
1		Simón Bolívar (1783–1830)	12 August 1825	29 December 1825 (Note: Resigned.)	139 days	Independent	Elected by the General Assembly	(Note: He was assigned the "Supreme Executive Power" of the Republic of Bolívar on 11 August 1825 by decree of the General Assembly. The same decree also states that Bolívar "shall have the honors of Protector and President" wherever he "exists outside [the country's] limits". In addition, the term "president" was not in common use at the time of his designation. Whether this then makes Bolívar not the first president is a minor source of academic dispute.)
2		Antonio José de Sucre (1795–1830)	29 December 1825	25 May 1826 (Note: Legal change.)	147 days	Independent	Received command from Bolívar	

=== Bolivian Republic (1826–1868) ===
Presidents of the Bolivian Republic (1826–1868) (Note: Simultaneously Supreme Protector of the Peru-Bolivian Confederation from 28 October 1836 – 20 February 1839.)
No.	Portrait	President	Took office	Left office	Duration	Party	Election	Vice President	Ref. and Notes
–		Casimiro Olañeta (1795–1860); Acting	25 May 1826	28 May 1826	3 days	Independent	–	No Office Exists	(Note: Pending the reception of orders from Peru recognising national independence, the military authority transfers its functions to a General Constituent Congress, presided by Casimiro Olañeta and convened at Chuquisaca.)
2		Antonio José de Sucre (1795–1830)	28 May 1826	9 December 1826	195 days	Independent	Elected by the General Constituent Congress	No Office Exists	
2		Antonio José de Sucre (1795–1830)	9 December 1826	18 April 1828 (Note: On 18 April 1828, Sucre delegated command to the council of ministers, presided by José María Pérez de Urdininea. At that time, Sucre did not resign. It was not until 2 August that he presented his definitive resignation to the Congress. Simultaneously, a new cabinet was appointed by decree, presided by José Miguel de Velasco.)	195 days	Independent	Elected by the General Constituent Congress	Vacant	
3		José María Pérez de Urdininea (1784–1865); Acting; President of Council of Ministers	18 April 1828	2 August 1828	106 days	Military	Received command from Sucre	Vacant	
4		José Miguel de Velasco (1795–1859); Acting; President of Council of Ministers	2 August 1828	12 August 1828	138 days	Military	Received command from Sucre	Vacant	
4		José Miguel de Velasco (1795–1859); Acting; President of Council of Ministers	12 August 1828	18 December 1828	138 days	Military	Elected by the General Constituent Congress (Vice President of Santa Cruz) (Note: Exerts command pending the arrival of the president-designate Andrés de Santa Cruz, who did not arrive. Later, the Congress reconvened and elected Pedro Blanco Soto.)	Himself; charged with State Administration	
–		José Ramón de Loayza (1751–1839); Acting	18 December 1828	26 December 1828	8 days	Independent	Elected by the General Assembly	Himself; charged with State Administration.	
5		Pedro Blanco Soto (1795–1829); Provisional	26 December 1828	1 January 1829 (†) (Note: Assassinated.)	6 days	Independent	Received command from Loayza	José Ramón de Loayza	
4		José Miguel de Velasco (1795–1859); Acting	1 January 1829	24 May 1829	143 days	Independent	Elected by the Constituent Congress (Vice President of Santa Cruz)	Himself; charged with State Administration.	
6		Andrés de Santa Cruz (1792–1865)	24 May 1829	16 July 1831	9 years, 269 days	Independent	Received Comand from Velasco	José Miguel de Velasco	
6		Andrés de Santa Cruz (1792–1865)	16 July 1831	15 August 1831	9 years, 269 days	Independent	Elected by the General Consitutent Assembly	José Miguel de Velasco	
6		Andrés de Santa Cruz (1792–1865)	15 August 1831	16 August 1835	9 years, 269 days	Independent	Elected by the General Consitutent Assembly	José Miguel de Velasco	
6		Andrés de Santa Cruz (1792–1865)	16 August 1835	28 October 1836	9 years, 269 days	Independent	Elected by the parish electoral boards	Mariano Enrique Calvo	
6		Andrés de Santa Cruz (1792–1865)	28 October 1836	17 February 1839 (Note: Coup d'état.) (Note: Andrés de Santa Cruz resigned from the presidency on 20 February, although in fact his government had been overthrown on the 17th due to the War of the Confederation. Most sources place the date of his official resignation as the end of his term.)	9 years, 269 days	Independent	Elected by the Tapacarí, Huaura, and Sicuani Congresses	Mariano Enrique Calvo	
–		Mariano Enrique Calvo (1791–1842); Acting	18 July 1838	17 February 1839	214 days	Independent	–	Himself; charged with State Administration.	(Note: Appointed to command the Bolivian State and serve as its representative the in absence of Santa Cruz who was governing the Peru-Bolivian Confederation on Peruvian soil.)
Office Vacant 17–22 February 1839.									(Note: On 9 February 1839, Velasco rebelled in Tupiza. In the following days, several pronouncements of support came until on 17 February the government chaired by Calvo was deposed. Velasco was sworn-in in Potosí after five days of lack of government.)
4		José Miguel de Velasco (1795–1859)	22 February 1839	16 June 1839	2 years, 108 days	Military	Installed by coup d'état	Vacant	
4		José Miguel de Velasco (1795–1859)	16 June 1839	15 August 1840	2 years, 108 days	Military	Elected by the General Constituent Congress	Office Abolished (Note: The Constitution of 1839 eliminated the vicepresidential position. In replacement, constitutional succession corresponds to the President of the Senate (Art. 69–71). This was modified on several occasions, corresponding to: the President of the National Council (1843: Art. 53–55); the Council of Ministers, which appoints a president from among its members (1851: Art. 73); the President of the Council of State (1861: Art. 53); the Council of Ministers as a whole (1868: Art. 67); the President of the Council of State (1871: Art. 70). The Constitution of 1878 (Art. 77) reestablished the vice presidency after 39 years.)	
4		José Miguel de Velasco (1795–1859)	15 August 1840	10 June 1841	2 years, 108 days	Military	Elected by the General Constituent Congress	Office Abolished	
7		Sebastián Ágreda (1795–1875); Provisional	10 June 1841	9 July 1841	29 days	Military	Installed by coup d'état	Office Abolished	(Note: Acting for Andrés de Santa Cruz (in exile) who never took office.)
8		Mariano; Enrique Calvo (1782–1842); Acting	9 July 1841	22 September 1841	75 days	Independent	Received command from Ágreda	Office Abolished	
Office vacant 22–27 September 1841.									(Note: On 22 September 1841, José Ballivián overthrew Calvo; days before, both Ballivián and José Miguel de Velasco at different points had disregarded the president and proclaimed themselves as heads of the republic. Between the day of the coup d'état and 27 September, the situation was on one side a vacancy of command and on the other simultaneous command of the country. Velasco in the south and Ballivián in La Paz proclaimed themselves president. Finally on the twenty-seventh, Ballivián was sworn-in to the presidency after five days of uncertainty.)
9		José Ballivián (1805–1852)	27 September 1841	23 April 1843	6 years, 87 days	Military	Installled by coup d'état	Office Abolished	
9		José Ballivián (1805–1852)	23 April 1843	15 August 1844	6 years, 87 days	Military	Elected by the National Convention	Office Abolished	
9		José Ballivián (1805–1852)	15 August 1844	23 December 1847	6 years, 87 days	Military	1844	Office Abolished	
10		Eusebio Guilarte (1805–1849); Acting	23 December 1847	2 January 1848	10 days	Independent	Constitutional succession (President of the National Council)	Office Abolished	
4		José Miguel de Velasco (1795–1859); Provisional (Note: Occasionally styled "Legal President of the Republic".)	18 January 1848 (Note: In dissidence since 2 November 1847.)	12 September 1848	323 days	Military	Installled by coup d'état	Office Abolished	
4		José Miguel de Velasco (1795–1859); Provisional	12 September 1848	6 December 1848	323 days	Military	Elected by the Extraordinary Congress	Office Abolished	
–		José María Linares (1808–1861); Acting	12 October 1848	6 December 1848	55 days	Independent	Received command from Velasco (Note: Velasco's Minister of War Manuel Isidoro Belzu initiated an uprising against Velasco and was proclaimed President by his supporters. Velasco entrused executive power to Linares, as President of the Congress, while he was conducting the war effort.)	Office Abolished	
11		Manuel Isidoro Belzu (1802–1865)	6 December 1848 (Note: In dissidence since 12 October 1848.)	15 August 1850	6 years, 252 days	Military	Installled by coup d'état	Office Abolished	
11		Manuel Isidoro Belzu (1802–1865)	15 August 1850	7 September 1850	6 years, 252 days	Military	1850	Office Abolished	
11		Manuel Isidoro Belzu (1802–1865)	7 September 1850	16 July 1851	6 years, 252 days	Military	Dictatorship declared (Note: The government became de facto on 7 September 1850 when the Congress declared itself empowered to adopt dictatorial measures. On 16 October, a dictatorship was formally established when Belzu assumed supreme command, with the use of extraordinary powers. Despite this, official records of the time continued refer to him as the Constitutional President of the Republic.)	Office Abolished	
11		Manuel Isidoro Belzu (1802–1865)	16 July 1851	15 August 1855	6 years, 252 days	Military	Constitutional freedoms restored	Office Abolished	
12		Jorge Córdova (1822–1861)	15 August 1855	9 September 1857 (Note: The overthrown government continued in dissidence until 21 October.)	2 years, 25 days	Independent	1855	Office Abolished	
13		José María Linares (1808–1861); Provisional	9 September 1857	14 January 1861	3 years, 127 days	Independent	Installled by coup d'état	Office Abolished	
–		Government Junta (Note: Junta was a Triumvirate lead by José María de Achá.)	14 January 1861	4 May 1861	110 days	Military	Installled by coup d'état	Office Abolished	
14		José María de Achá (1810–1868)	4 May 1861	15 August 1862	3 years, 238 days	Independent	Elected by the Constituent National Assembly	Office Abolished	
14		José María de Achá (1810–1868)	15 August 1862	28 December 1864	3 years, 238 days	Independent	1862	Office Abolished	
15		Mariano Melgarejo (1820–1871)	28 December 1864	15 August 1868	3 years, 278 days	Military	Installled by coup d'état	Office Abolished	
15		Mariano Melgarejo (1820–1871)	15 August 1868	1 October 1868	3 years, 278 days	Military	1868	Office Abolished	

=== Republic of Bolivia (1868–2009) ===
Presidents of the Republic of Bolivia (1868–2009)
No.	Portrait	President	Took office	Left office	Duration	Party	Election	Vice President	Ref. and Notes
15		Mariano Melgarejo (1820–1871)	1 October 1868	3 February 1869	2 years, 106 days	Military	1868 Political Constitution	Office Abolished	
15		Mariano Melgarejo (1820–1871)	3 February 1869	31 May 1869	2 years, 106 days	Military	Dictatorship declared	Office Abolished	
15		Mariano Melgarejo (1820–1871)	31 May 1869	15 August 1870	2 years, 106 days	Military	Constitutional freedoms restored	Office Abolished	
15		Mariano Melgarejo (1820–1871)	15 August 1870	15 January 1871	2 years, 106 days	Military	1870	Office Abolished	
16		Agustín Morales (1808–1872)	15 January 1871 (Note: In dissidence since 26 November 1870.)	18 June 1871	1 year, 317 days	Military	Installed by coup d'état	Office Abolished	
16		Agustín Morales (1808–1872)	18 June 1871	25 August 1872	1 year, 317 days	Military	Elected by Constituent Assembly	Office Abolished	
16		Agustín Morales (1808–1872)	25 August 1872	27 November 1872 (†)	1 year, 317 days	Military	1872	Office Abolished	
-		Juan de Dios Bosque (1829–1890); Acting	27 November 1872	28 November 1872	1 day	Independent	Constitutional succession (President of the National Assembly)	Office Abolished	(Note: It is agreed by legal records and scholarly sources that Morales died on 27 November and Tomás Frías assumed office on 28 November. However, some texts in the list of presidents of Bolivia include Juan de Dios Bosque as acting president from the night of the 27th to the 28th. Why some sources include Bosque and others omit him is unclear, though it is possibly due to the fact that executive power was transferred to him automatically and not through any formal processes.)
17		Tomás Frías (1804–1884)	28 November 1872	9 May 1873	162 days	Independent	Constitutional succession (President of the Council of State)	Office Abolished	
18		Adolfo Ballivián (1831–1874)	9 May 1873	14 February 1874 (†) (Note: Natural causes.)	281 days	Red (Note: The Red Party, which was the origin of the Conservative and Liberal parties, was the faction which presented Ballivián in the 1873 election. Prior to 1880, groups such as the Reds did not yet possess a programmatic and ideological structure that would allow them to be defined as proper political parties.)	1873 (Elected by the National Congress) (Note: Since the majority candidate did not achieve 51% of the total votes cast, Congress was responsible for the election of the president among the three most voted candidates. In all but two of these cases, it elected the winner of the popular vote plurality. In 1985, the Congress elected the second in the popular vote and in 1989 it elected the third in the popular vote.)	Office Abolished	
17		Tomás Frías (1804–1884)	31 January 1874	14 February 1874 (Note: Acting due to the illness of Adolfo Ballivián and upon his death governs as constitutional president.)	2 years, 94 days	Independent	Constitutional succession (President of the Council of State)	Office Abolished	
17		Tomás Frías (1804–1884)	14 February 1874	4 May 1876	2 years, 94 days	Independent	Constitutional succession (President of the Council of State)	Office Abolished	
19		Hilarión Daza (1840–1894); Provisional	4 May 1876	15 November 1877	3 years, 238 days	Military	Installed by coup d'état	Office Abolished	
19		Hilarión Daza (1840–1894); Provisional	15 November 1877	28 December 1879	3 years, 238 days	Military	Elected by Constitutent Assembly	Vacant	
-		Pedro José de Guerra (1809–1879); Acting; President of the Cabinet of Ministers	17 April 1879	10 September 1879 (†)	146 days	Independent	Received command from Daza (Note: Held executive power while Daza personally commanded the Bolivian Army during the War of the Pacific.)	Vacant	(Note: On 17 April 1879, Daza delegated command to his council of ministers while he took command of the armed forces in the War of the Pacific. Given the absence of Minister of Government Serapio Reyes Ortiz, Pedro José de Guerra, senior minister of the Supreme Court, was entrusted to precide over the council of ministers. On 11 September, de Guerra died and was replaced by Reyes Ortiz.)
-		Serapio Reyes Ortiz (1822–1900); Acting; President of the Cabinet of Ministers	11 September 1879	28 December 1879	108 days	Conservative	Received command from Daza (Note: Held executive power while Daza personally commanded the Bolivian Army during the War of the Pacific.)	Vacant	(Note: On 17 April 1879, Daza delegated command to his council of ministers while he took command of the armed forces in the War of the Pacific. Given the absence of Minister of Government Serapio Reyes Ortiz, Pedro José de Guerra, senior minister of the Supreme Court, was entrusted to precide over the council of ministers. On 11 September, de Guerra died and was replaced by Reyes Ortiz.)
-		Uladislao Silva (1840–1898); President of the Government Junta	28 December 1879	19 January 1880	22 days	Military	Installed by coup d'état	Vacant	(Note: When Daza was overthrown in Tacna, several uprisings took place. The most important of these is that of La Paz in which a civil-military junta was proclaimed. The junta was not recognized by any of the remaining Bolivian departments. For this reason, this period is regarded as the fourth period of nationwide lack of government lasting more than 24 hours. The junta lasted until 19 January 1880 when it dissolved itself and, by decree, designated Narciso Campero as president by proclamation of the Republic, this time accepted by the entire country.)
20		Narciso Campero (1813–1896)	19 January 1880	31 May 1880	4 years, 229 days	Independent (Note: Campero joined the newly formed Liberal Party after he left office.)	Received command from military junta	Vacant	
20		Narciso Campero (1813–1896)	31 May 1880	4 September 1884	4 years, 229 days	Independent	Elected By the National Convention	Aniceto Arce (Note: Dismissed and exiled from the country.) (Note: The 1880 Constitution established a dual vice presidency each were elected like the president by direct vote, but with different powers: The first vice president presided over the Senate and was empowered to replace or succeed the president while the second vice president only had the function of replacing or succeeding the president in case of absence, resignation, inability or death of the first vice president. The office of Second Vice President was abolished in 1921.) (vacant after 11 Mar. 1881)	
20		Narciso Campero (1813–1896)	31 May 1880	4 September 1884	4 years, 229 days	Independent	Elected By the National Convention	Belisario Salinas	
21		Gregorio Pacheco (1823–1899)	4 September 1884	15 August 1888	3 years, 346 days	Democratic (Note: Pacheco ran for president on the Democratic Party ticket. To secure support from in the Congressional ballot, Pacheco and his electoral opponent Aniceto Arce formed the Conservative Party from their respective Democratic and Constitutional parties.)	1884 (Elected by the National Congress)	Mariano Baptista	
21		Gregorio Pacheco (1823–1899)	4 September 1884	15 August 1888	3 years, 346 days	Conservative	1884 (Elected by the National Congress)	Jorge Oblitas	
22		Aniceto Arce (1824–1906)	15 August 1888	11 August 1892	3 years, 362 days	Conservative	1888	José Manuel del Carpio	
22		Aniceto Arce (1824–1906)	15 August 1888	11 August 1892	3 years, 362 days	Conservative	1888	Serapio Reyes Ortiz	
23		Mariano Baptista (1831–1907)	11 August 1892	19 August 1896	4 years, 8 days	Conservative	1892 (Elected by the National Congress)	Severo Fernández	
23		Mariano Baptista (1831–1907)	11 August 1892	19 August 1896	4 years, 8 days	Conservative	1892 (Elected by the National Congress)	Vacant (Note: The second vice presidency remained vacant due to the death of Juan Federico Zuazo before taking office.)	
24		Severo Fernández (1849–1925)	19 August 1896	12 April 1899 (Note: Ousted by the Federal War)	2 years, 236 days	Conservative	1896	Rafael Peña	
24		Severo Fernández (1849–1925)	19 August 1896	12 April 1899	2 years, 236 days	Conservative	1896	Jenaro Sanjinés	
-		Government Junta (Note: The Junta was made up of José Manuel Pando, Serapio Reyes Ortiz, Macario Pinilla Vargas and Fernando Eloy Guachalla.)	12 April 1899	25 October 1899	196 days	Liberal	Installed by the Federal War	Vacant	
25		José Manuel Pando (1849–1917)	28 October 1899	14 August 1904	4 years, 291 days	Liberal	Elected by the National Convention	Lucio Pérez Velasco (vacant after 23 Jan. 1903)	
25		José Manuel Pando (1849–1917)	28 October 1899	14 August 1904	4 years, 291 days	Liberal	Elected by the National Convention	Aníbal Capriles	
26		Ismael Montes (1861–1933)	14 August 1904	12 August 1909 (Note: Montes' term of office was extended by one year due to the death of the president-elect Fernando Eloy Guachalla before taking office.)	4 years, 363 days	Liberal	1904	Eliodoro Villazón	
26		Ismael Montes (1861–1933)	14 August 1904	12 August 1909	4 years, 363 days	Liberal	1904	Valentín Abecia	
27		Eliodoro Villazón (1848–1939)	12 August 1909	14 August 1913	4 years, 2 days	Liberal	1909	Macario Pinilla	
27		Eliodoro Villazón (1848–1939)	12 August 1909	14 August 1913	4 years, 2 days	Liberal	1909	Juan Misael Saracho	
26		Ismael Montes (1861–1933)	14 August 1913	15 August 1917	4 years, 1 day	Liberal	1913	Juan Misael Saracho (Note: Second vice president (1909–1913); first vice president (1913–1915). Died in office of natural causes.) (vacant after 1 Oct. 1915)	
26		Ismael Montes (1861–1933)	14 August 1913	15 August 1917	4 years, 1 day	Liberal	1913	José Carrasco	
28		José Gutiérrez Guerra (1869–1929)	15 August 1917	12 July 1920	2 years, 332 days	Liberal	1917	Ismael Vázquez	
28		José Gutiérrez Guerra (1869–1929)	15 August 1917	12 July 1920	2 years, 332 days	Liberal	1917	José Santos Quinteros	
-		Government Junta	13 July 1920	28 January 1921	199 days	Republican	Installed by coup d'état	Vacant	
29		Bautista Saavedra (1870–1939)	28 January 1921	3 September 1925	4 years, 218 days	Republican	Elected by the National Convention	Vacant (Note: On 2 February 1921, the National Convention elected Luis Paz vice president, who, having not been consulted, resigned on 29 March before taking office.)	
30		Felipe Segundo Guzmán (1879–1932); Provisional	3 September 1925	10 January 1926	129 days	Republican	Constitutional succession (President of the Senate) (Note: The results of the May 1925 elections were annulled, because the winner, Gabino Villanueva, was ruled ineligible to assume office due to his not having resigned from his ministerial office six months prior to the election date. Since Saavedra's term was due to end in August, Congress extended his mandate and President Saavedra handed over the reins of the nation to the President of the Senate Felipe Segundo Guzmán till new elections could be held in December 1925.)	Vacant	
31		Hernando Siles Reyes (1882–1942)	10 January 1926	28 May 1930	4 years, 138 days	Republican (Note: Siles Reyes was elected president on the Republican Party ticket. His policy priorities as president soon proved to be opposed to most of the Republican agenda, and he formed the National Union Party in early 1927, later rebranded as the Nationalist Party.)	1925	Abdón Saavedra	
31		Hernando Siles Reyes (1882–1942)	10 January 1926	28 May 1930	4 years, 138 days	Nationalist	1925	Abdón Saavedra	
-		Council of Ministers (Note: When Siles decided to resign, he did not hand over power to his vice president, Saavedra, but rather to his cabinet of ministers, violating the existing order of succession. In turn, the cabinet governed the country as a junta without electing a president.)	28 May 1930	28 June 1930	31 days	(Note: The cabinet had members from the Nationalist Party as well as independents and military officials.)	Received command from Siles Reyes	Vacant	
32		Carlos Blanco Galindo (1882–1943); President of Military Junta	28 June 1930	5 March 1931	250 days	Military	Installed by coup d'état	Vacant	
33		Daniel Salamanca (1869–1935)	5 March 1931	1 December 1934	3 years, 271 days	Genuine Republican	1931	José Luis Tejada Sorzano	
34		José Luis Tejada Sorzano (1882–1938)	1 December 1934 (Note: On 28 November, Tejada Sorzano became acting president in the absence of Salamanca who had been arrested at Villamontes. It was not until 1 December when Salamanca's resignation was delivered that Tejada Sorzano officially assumed the presidency.)	17 May 1936	1 year, 168 days	Liberal	Installed by coup d'état	Vacant	(Note: Upon assuming office, an attempt was made to give Tejada Sorzano a veneer of legality through the guise of constitutional succession to what in reality was a coup d'état. Though his capacity as vice president made him constitutionally capable of succeeding to office, the circumstances make his a de facto government. Despite this, official records of the time refer to him as the Constitutional President of the Republic.)
-		Germán Busch (1903–1939); Provisional Head of Government Junta	17 May 1936	22 May 1936	5 days	Military Socialist (Note: In the case of the denominated periods of military nationalism/socialism, the definition can not be said to be exact, although it is evident that it includes a phenomenon of left-wing governments of a military nature. The government of Gulaberto Villarroel is also included in this group, which appears under the RADEPA moniker. The word "nationalism" has been used especially since 1964 by practically all military governments, although its meaning in the cases not mentioned by this note has not had either the content or governing sense of the governments listed.)	Installed by coup d'état	Vacant	
35		David Toro (1898–1977)	22 May 1936	13 July 1937	1 year, 52 days	Military Socialist	Succeeded to lead the junta	Vacant	(Note: From 21 June 1936, the civil-military government is terminated and the Government Junta modified into the Military Government Junta.)
36		Germán Busch (1903–1939)	13 July 1937	28 May 1938	2 years, 41 days	Military Socialist	Installed by coup d'état	Vacant	
36		Germán Busch (1903–1939)	28 May 1938	24 April 1939	2 years, 41 days	Military Socialist	Elected by the National Convention	Enrique Baldivieso	
36		Germán Busch (1903–1939)	24 April 1939	23 August 1939 (†) (Note: Committed suicide 23 August 1939; see Germán Busch § Death and controversy for further details. The circumstances of his death are a source of controversy.)	2 years, 41 days	Military Socialist	Dictatorship declared	Vacant (Note: While Baldivieso remained active in government after 24 April 1939, no "vice dictator" position ever existed and Busch's self-coup effectively annulled the vice president's term in office.)	
37		Carlos Quintanilla (1888–1964); Provisional	23 August 1939	15 April 1940	236 days	Military	Installed by coup d'état	Vacant	
37		Carlos Quintanilla (1888–1964); Provisional	23 August 1939	15 April 1940	236 days	Military	Installed by coup d'état	Office Abolished (Note: Office abolished between 4 December 1939 and 6 November 1945.)	
38		Enrique Peñaranda (1892–1969)	15 April 1940	20 December 1943	3 years, 249 days	Concordance	1940	Office Abolished	
39		Gualberto Villarroel (1908–1946)	20 December 1943	5 April 1944	2 years, 213 days	Reason for the Fatherland (RADEPA) (Note: RADEPA, while not a true political party, was an organized military group that alligned with the Revolutionary Nationalist Movement to instigate the 1943 coup.)	Installed by coup d'état (Note: Leader of Government Junta)	Office Abolished	
39		Gualberto Villarroel (1908–1946)	5 April 1944	6 August 1944	2 years, 213 days	Reason for the Fatherland (RADEPA)	Junta is disolved	Office Abolished	
39		Gualberto Villarroel (1908–1946)	6 August 1944	21 July 1946 (Note: Assassinated 21 July 1946; see 1946 La Paz riots for further details. Villarroel presented his resignation hours prior to being victimized.) (Note: Villarroel resigned in favor of General Dámaso Arenas, then commander-in-chief of the armed forces. There is no record that Arenas was ever sworn-in as president.)	2 years, 213 days	Reason for the Fatherland (RADEPA)	Elected by the National Convention	Julián Montellano	
40		Néstor Guillén (1890–1966); Provisional	21 July 1946	17 August 1946	27 days	Independent	Installed by a popular uprising	Vacant	
41		Tomás Monje (1884–1954); Provisional	17 August 1946	10 March 1947	205 days	Independent	Succeeded to lead the junta	Vacant	
42		Enrique Hertzog (1897–1981)	10 March 1947	24 October 1949 (Note: Hertzog transferred executive functions to Urriolagoitía on 7 May 1949. He definitively resigned on 22 October. Urriolagoitía maintained acting functions until his swearing-in on 24 October.)	2 years, 228 days	Republican Socialist Unity	1947 (Elected by the National Congress)	Mamerto Urriolagoitía	
43		Mamerto Urriolagoitía (1895–1974)	24 October 1949	16 May 1951	1 year, 204 days	Republican Socialist Unity	Constitutional succession	Vacant	
44		Hugo Ballivián (1901–1993); President of Government Junta	16 May 1951	11 April 1952 (Note: Ousted by the National Revolution.)	331 days	Military	Installed by coup d'état	Vacant	
-		Hernán Siles Zuazo (1914–1996); Provisional	11 April 1952	15 April 1952	4 days	Revolutionary Nationalist	Installed by the National Revolution	Vacant	
45		Víctor Paz Estenssoro (1907–2001)	15 April 1952	6 August 1956	4 years, 113 days	Revolutionary Nationalist	Received command from Siles Zuazo	Hernán Siles Zuazo	(Note: When the presidency was handed over to Víctor Paz Estenssoro after the revolutionary triumph, an attempt was made to validate the electoral victory of the MNR in 1951 (popular vote plurality). Legally it is not possible to subjectively and retroactively apply an action concluded in May 1951. For this reason this government is considered de facto. Despite this, official records of the time refer to him as the Constitutional President of the Republic.)
46		Hernán Siles Zuazo (1914–1996)	6 August 1956	6 August 1960	4 years, 0 days	Revolutionary Nationalist	1956	Ñuflo Chávez Ortiz (Note: Resigned from office. Vacant after 24 June 1957.)	
45		Víctor Paz Estenssoro (1907–2001)	6 August 1960	4 November 1964	4 years, 90 days	Revolutionary Nationalist	1960	Juan Lechín	
45		Víctor Paz Estenssoro (1907–2001)	6 August 1960	4 November 1964	4 years, 90 days	Revolutionary Nationalist	1964	René Barrientos	
47		René Barrientos (1919–1969)	4 November 1964	5 November 1964 (Note: On 4 November 1964, General Ovando Candía announced the formation of a military junta which he would head. However, "it was not at all clear who was in control" as both he and Barrientos vied for leadership of the government. On 5 November, both were sworn-in as co-chairmen of the junta but Ovando Candía resigned an hour later.)	1 year, 59 days	Military	Installed by coup d'état	Vacant	
47		René Barrientos (1919–1969)	5 November 1964	25 May 1965 (Note: On 26 May 1965, Barrientos designated Ovando Candía as co-president of the junta, a unique case in the history of Bolivia and the Americas. Both individuals held the executive simultaneously until 2 January 1966 when Barrientos resigned to qualify as a candidate in the 1966 general election.)	1 year, 59 days	Military	Installed by coup d'état	Vacant	
47		René Barrientos (1919–1969)	26 May 1965	2 January 1966	1 year, 59 days	Military	Co-presidency of the Junta	Vacant	
48		Alfredo Ovando Candía (1918–1982)	26 May 1965 (Note: On 26 May 1965, Barrientos designated Ovando Candía as co-president of the junta, a unique case in the history of Bolivia and the Americas. Both individuals held the executive simultaneously until 2 January 1966 when Barrientos resigned to qualify as a candidate in the 1966 general election.)	2 January 1966	1 year, 72 days	Military	Co-presidency of the Junta	Vacant	
48		Alfredo Ovando Candía (1918–1982)	2 January 1966	6 August 1966	1 year, 72 days	Military	Succeeded to lead the junta	Vacant	
47		René Barrientos (1919–1969)	6 August 1966	27 April 1969 (†) (Note: Died in a helicopter accident 27 April 1969. The circumstances of his death are a source of controversy.)	2 years, 264 days	Popular Christian	1966	Luis Adolfo Siles Salinas	
49		Luis Adolfo Siles Salinas (1925–2005)	27 April 1969	26 September 1969	152 days	Social Democratic	Constitutional succession (Vice President of Barrientos)	Vacant	
48		Alfredo Ovando Candía (1918–1982)	26 September 1969	6 October 1970	1 year, 10 days	Military Nationalist	Installed by coup d'état	Vacant	(Note: Occasionally styled "President of the Revolutionary Government".)
-		Rogelio Miranda	6 October 1970	6 October 1970	less than 1 day	Military	Installed by coup d'état	Vacant	(Note: After the resignation of Ovando Candía, "the official spokesman for the movement headed by Miranda [...] released a statement indicating that the Army commander headed the Military Government Junta". Despite the proclamation, he renounced the position in favor of a military junta. Having never been sworn-in, he thus isn't considered to have officially taken office.)
-		Government Junta	6 October 1970	7 October 1970	1 day	Military	Installed by coup d'état	Vacant	
50		Juan José Torres (1920–1976)	7 October 1970	21 August 1971	318 days	Military Nationalist	Installed by a coup d'état	Vacant	
51		Hugo Banzer (1926–2002)	21 August 1971	22 August 1971	6 years, 334 days	Military	Installed by coup d'état as co-president of Government Junta	Vacant	
51		Hugo Banzer (1926–2002)	22 August 1971	21 July 1978	6 years, 334 days	Military	Received command from the junta	Vacant	
-		Víctor González Fuentes; Chairman of military junta	21 July 1978	21 July 1978	less than 1 day	Military	Received command from Banzer	Vacant	
52		Juan Pereda (1931–2012)	21 July 1978	24 November 1978	126 days	Military	Installed by a coup d'état	Vacant	
53		David Padilla (1927–2016); President of Military Junta	24 November 1978	8 August 1979	257 days	Military	Installed by a coup d'état	Vacant	
54		Wálter Guevara (1912–1996)	8 August 1979	1 November 1979 (Note: The overthrown government continued in dissidence until 16 November.)	85 days	Authentic Revolutionary	Elected by the National Congress (President of the National Senate)	Vacant	(Note: In the case of Wálter Guevara and Lidia Gueiler, they were erroneously referred to as acting when in fact they had a provisional character.)
55		Alberto Natusch (1933–1994)	1 November 1979	16 November 1979	15 days	Military	Installed by a coup d'état	Vacant	
56		Lidia Gueiler (1921–2011)	16 November 1979	17 July 1980	244 days	Revolutionary Nationalist Left	Elected by the National Congress (President of the Chamber of Deputies)	Vacant	
57		Luis García Meza (1929–2018)	17 July 1980	18 July 1980	1 year, 18 days	Military	Installed by a coup d'état as co-president of Government Junta	Vacant	
57		Luis García Meza (1929–2018)	18 July 1980	4 August 1981	1 year, 18 days	Military	Received command from the junta	Vacant	
-		Government Junta	4 August 1981	4 September 1981	31 days	Military	Received command from García Meza	Vacant	
58		Celso Torrelio (1933–1999)	4 September 1981	19 July 1982	318 days	Military	Received command from junta	Vacant	
-		Government Junta	19 July 1982	21 July 1982	2 days	Military	Received command from Torrelio	Vacant	
59		Guido Vildoso (born 1937)	21 July 1982	10 October 1982	81 days	Military	Received command from the junta	Vacant	
46		Hernán Siles Zuazo (1914–1996)	10 October 1982	6 August 1985 (Note: The severe economic crisis during the term of Siles Zuazo forced the president to advance the call for elections by one year and consequently reduce his term of office by one year from four that began in 1982.)	2 years, 300 days	Left-wing Revolutionary Nationalist	1980 (Elected by the National Congress) (Note: In July 1980, a coup d'état annulled the results of that year's general elections. In 1982 the military, pressured by the demands of various sectors of the country, opted not to hold new elections and instead summoned the Congress elected in 1980 which elected Siles Zuazo from among the three most voted candidates.)	Jaime Paz Zamora	
45		Víctor Paz Estenssoro (1907–2001)	6 August 1985	6 August 1989	4 years, 0 days	Revolutionary Nationalist	1985 (Elected by the National Congress)	Julio Garrett Ayllón	
60		Jaime Paz Zamora (born 1939)	6 August 1989	6 August 1993	4 years, 0 days	Revolutionary Left	1989 (Elected by the National Congress)	Luis Ossio (Note: Paz Zamora contested the 1989 election with Gustavo Fernández Saavedra as his running mate. However, in order to secure the support of the ADN in the congressional ballot, the MIR agreed to exchange Fernández Saavedra with Hugo Banzer's running mate Luis Ossio.)	
61		Gonzalo Sánchez de Lozada (born 1930)	6 August 1993	6 August 1997	4 years, 0 days	Revolutionary Nationalist	1993 (Elected by the National Congress)	Víctor Hugo Cárdenas	
51		Hugo Banzer (1926–2002)	6 August 1997	7 August 2001	4 years, 1 day	Nationalist Democratic Action	1997 (Elected by the National Congress)	Jorge Quiroga	
62		Jorge Quiroga (born 1960)	7 August 2001 (Note: From 1 July – 7 August 2001, Jorge Quiroga fufilled the role of acting president.)	6 August 2002	364 days	Nationalist Democratic Action	Constitutional succession (Vice President of Banzer)	Vacant	
61		Gonzalo Sánchez de Lozada (born 1930)	6 August 2002	17 October 2003	1 year, 72 days	Revolutionary Nationalist	2002 (Elected by the National Congress)	Carlos Mesa	
63		Carlos Mesa (born 1953)	17 October 2003	9 June 2005	1 year, 235 days	Independent	Constitutional succession (Vice President of Sánchez de Lozada)	Vacant	
64		Eduardo Rodríguez Veltzé (born 1956)	9 June 2005	22 January 2006	227 days	Independent	Constitutional succession (President of the Supreme Court)	Vacant	(Note: Senate President Hormando Vaca Diez and Chamber of Deputies leader Mario Cossío did not take the post, under pressure from opposition protestors. Rodríguez, as the non-partisan head of the judiciary, was fourth in the line of succession.)
65		Evo Morales (born 1959)	22 January 2006	7 January 2009	2 years, 351 days	Movement for Socialism	2005	Álvaro García Linera	

=== Plurinational State of Bolivia (2009–present) ===
Presidents of the Plurinational State of Bolivia (2009–present)
No.	Portrait	President	Took office	Left office	Duration	Party	Election	Vice President	Ref. and Notes
65		Evo Morales (born 1959)	7 February 2009	22 January 2010	10 years, 276 days	Movement for Socialism	2009 Political Constitution	Álvaro García Linera	
65		Evo Morales (born 1959)	7 February 2009	22 January 2010	10 years, 276 days	Movement for Socialism	2009	Álvaro García Linera	
65		Evo Morales (born 1959)	22 January 2010	22 January 2015	10 years, 276 days	Movement for Socialism	2014	Álvaro García Linera	
65		Evo Morales (born 1959)	22 January 2015	10 November 2019 (Note: Morales and the Movement for Socialism maintain that he was ousted by a coup d'état.)	10 years, 276 days	Movement for Socialism	2019 (Annulled) (Note: The Organization of American States did not recognize the election results due to violations and fraud. On the eve of his resignation, President Evo Morales agreed to hold reruns of the elections.)	Álvaro García Linera	
Office vacant 10–12 November 2019.									
66		Jeanine Áñez (born 1967)	12 November 2019	8 November 2020	362 days	Social Democratic	Constitutional succession (President of the Senate Chamber) (Note: Áñez, as second vice president of the Senate, was de facto sixth position in the order of succession. She proclaimed herself president of the Upper House, later using that position as a basis to claim constitutional succession to the presidency following the resignations of President Morales, Vice-President Álvaro Marcelo García Linera, Senate Speaker Adriana Salvatierra Arrias and his First Vice-Speaker, as well as the vacancy in the post of Speaker of the House of Representatives)	Vacant	(Note: The Movement for Socialism maintains that the presidency of Jeanine Áñez was unconstitutional and a de facto government.)
67		Luis Arce (born 1963)	8 November 2020	8 November 2025	5 years, 0 days	Movement for Socialism (Note: Party membership disputed from 4 October 2023 to 26 November 2024. Expelled from the party on 6 November 2025, two days before the end of his term.)	2020	David Choquehuanca	
68		Rodrigo Paz (born 1967)	8 November 2025	Incumbent	1 year, 4 days	Christian Democratic (Note: Elected as the candidate of the Christian Democratic Party (PDC), he also became a member of the Revolutionary Left Movement (MIR) upon its legal personality being restored in November 2025.)	2025	Edmand Lara	

== See also ==
- President of Bolivia
- Vice President of Bolivia
- Constitution of Bolivia
- Politics of Bolivia
