= List of oldest living state leaders =

This article lists the 100 oldest living current or former state leaders whose age can be demonstrated beyond reasonable doubt. State leaders are defined to include heads of state (including representatives who act in their stead, generally a governor-general), heads of government and internationally recognized de facto leaders (Note: Including but not limited to Prime Ministers of South Korea, recognized as heads of government by the United Nations and party leaders of single-party states.) of sovereign states with significant international recognition. Leaders are not included if no reliable secondary sources have confirmed that the leader is alive within the last 10 years. The oldest living former state leader is Guillermo Rodríguez of Ecuador at the age of 103 years, 18 days. Leaders currently in office are in bold in green, with Paul Biya of Cameroon being the oldest currently serving state leader at the age of 93 years, 282 days.

== Gallery ==
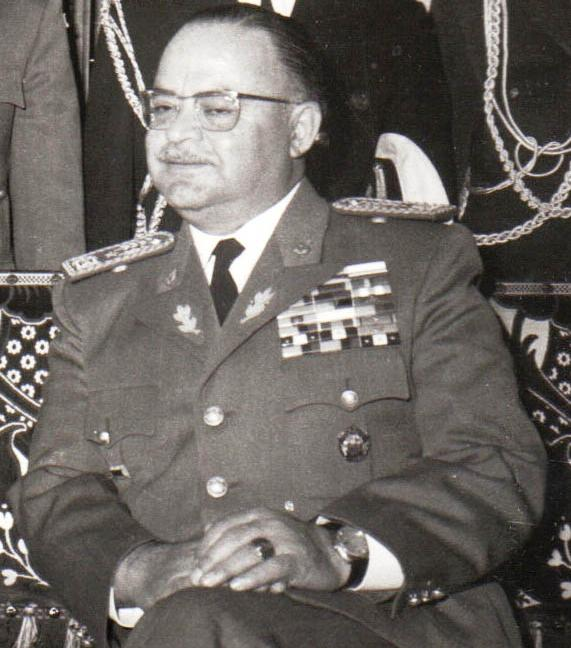
Oldest living:
**Guillermo Rodríguez**
Ecuador
1972–1976

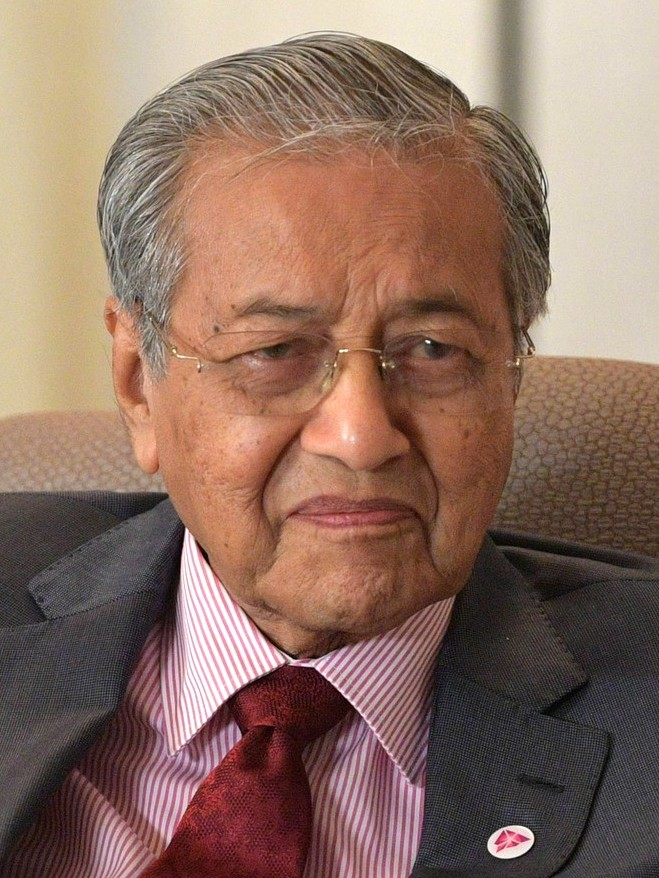
2nd‑oldest living:
**Mahathir Mohamad**
Malaysia
1981–2003 and 2018–2020

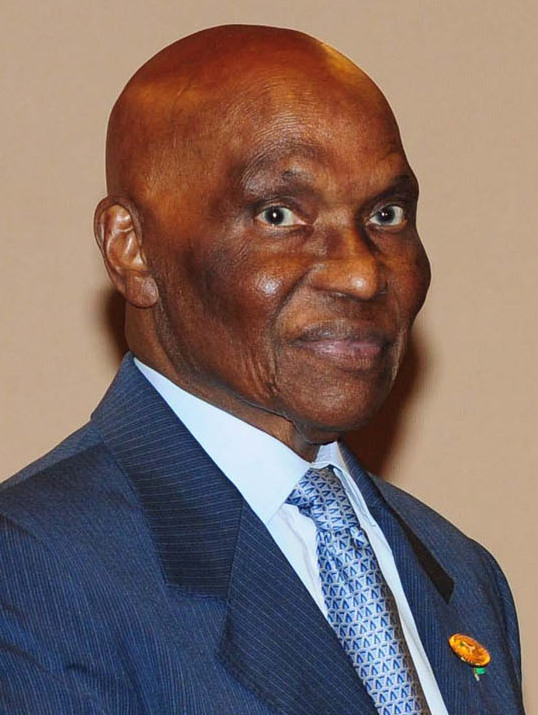
4th‑oldest living:
**Abdoulaye Wade**
Senegal
2000–2012

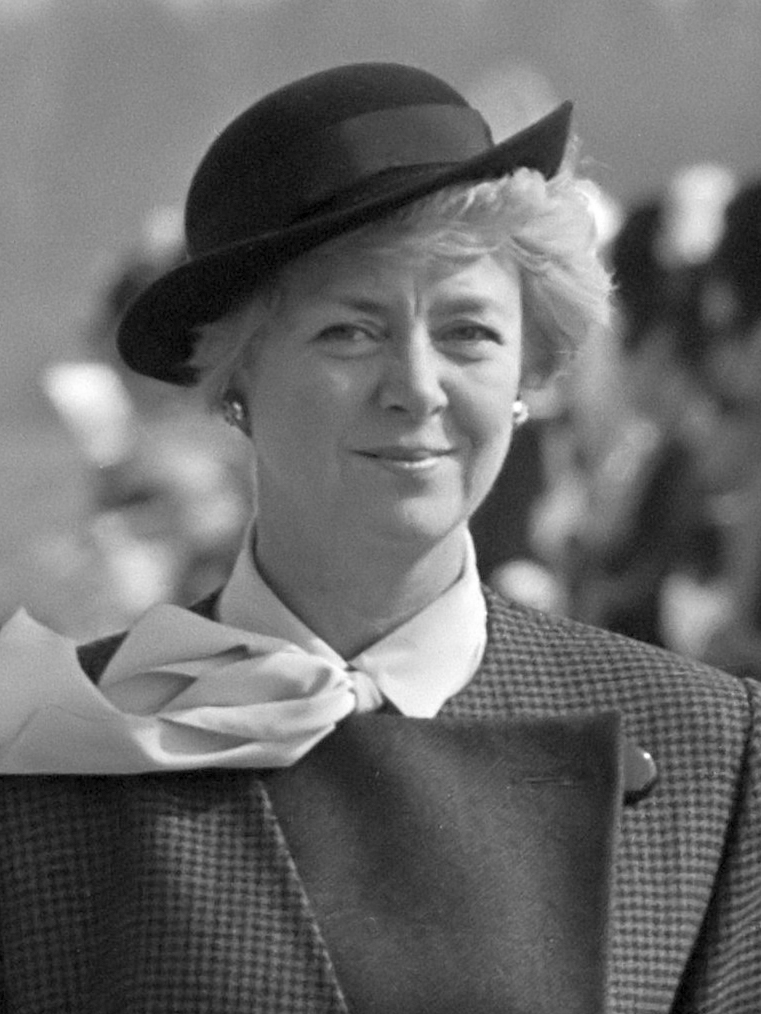
Oldest living female state leader and 14th‑oldest living:
**Vigdís Finnbogadóttir**
Iceland
1980–1996

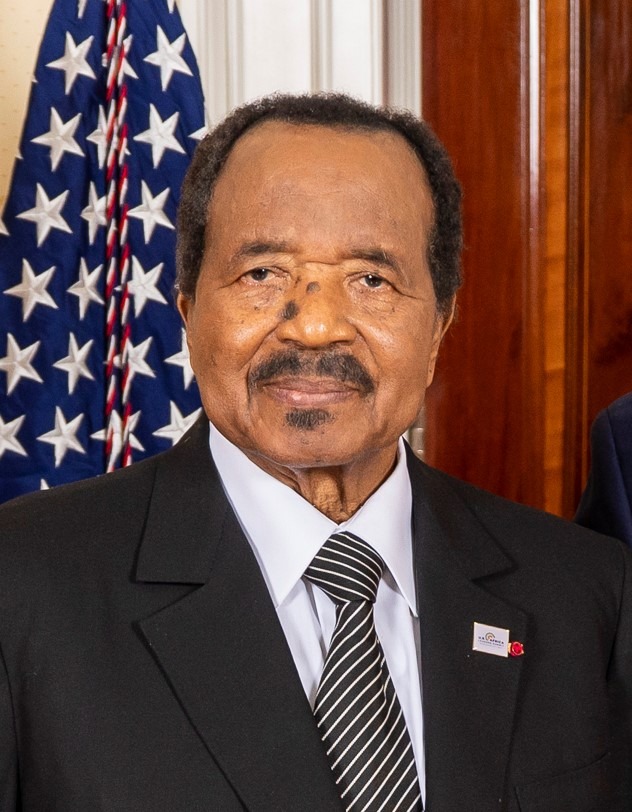
Oldest living incumbent and 41st‑oldest living:
**Paul Biya**
Cameroon
1975–present

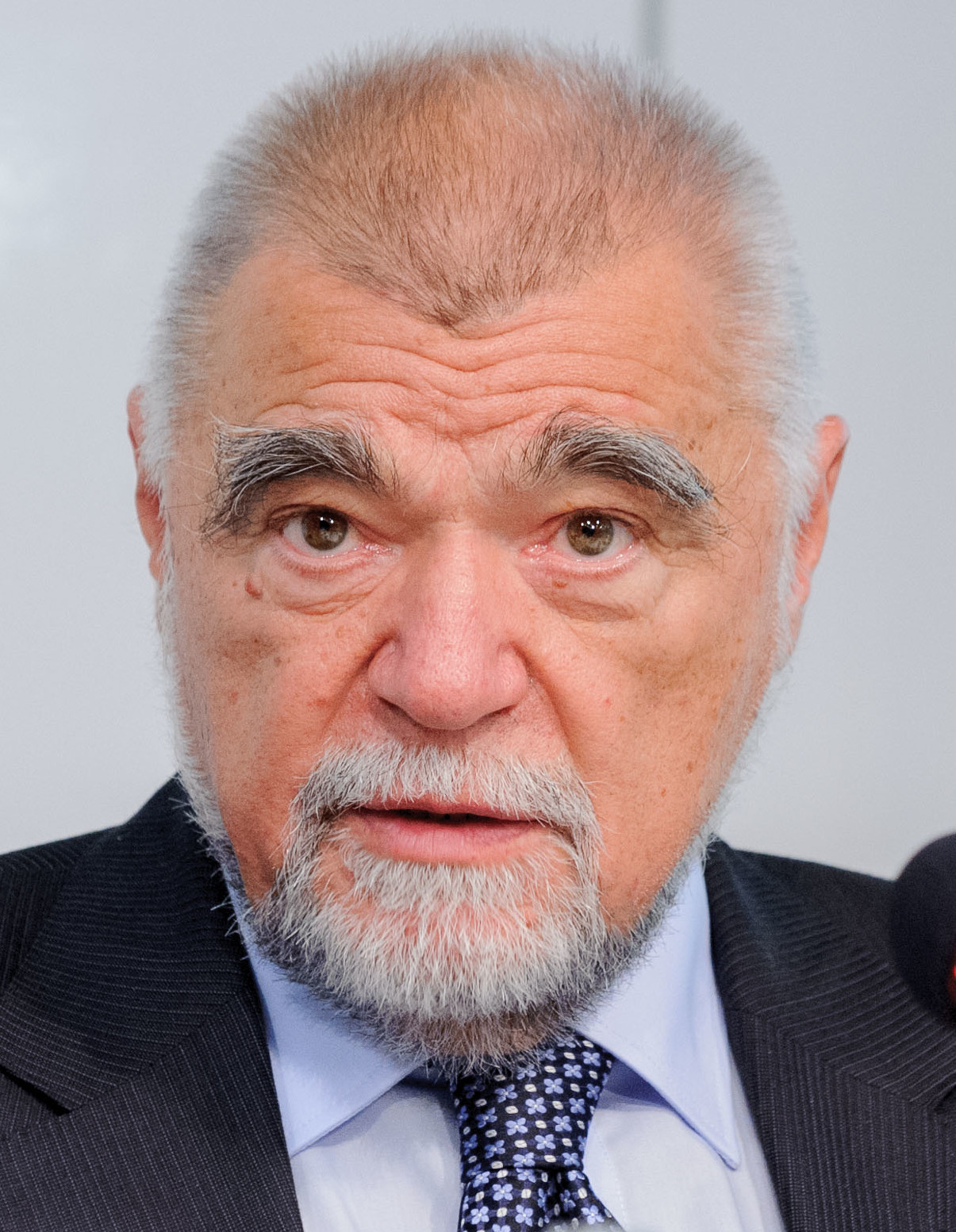
Oldest living of a now-defunct state and 71st‑oldest living:
**Stjepan Mesić**
Yugoslavia
1991

== List ==
Currently in office

No.	Name	State	Position	Birth	Age	Living as of
1	Guillermo Rodríguez	Ecuador	Acting President (1972–1976)	4 Nov 1923	103 years, 18 days	4 Nov 2026
2	Mahathir Mohamad	Malaysia	Prime Minister (1981–2003; 2018–2020)	10 Jul 1925	101 years, 135 days	28 Sep 2026
3	Mohammad Hasan Sharq	Afghanistan	Chairman of the Council of Ministers (1988–1989)	17 Jul 1925	101 years, 128 days	6 Oct 2024
4	Abdoulaye Wade	Senegal	President (2000–2012)	29 May 1926	100 years, 177 days	29 May 2026
5	Valdas Adamkus	Lithuania	President (1998–2003; 2004–2009)	3 Nov 1926	100 years, 19 days	3 Nov 2026
6	Arthur Foulkes	Bahamas	Governor-General (2010–2014)	11 May 1928	98 years, 195 days	8 Jul 2026
7	Péter Boross	Hungary	Prime Minister (1993–1994)	27 Aug 1928	98 years, 87 days	27 Aug 2025
8	Orville Turnquest	Bahamas	Governor-General (1995–2001)	19 Jul 1929	97 years, 126 days	18 Sep 2025
9	Michael J. Williams	Trinidad and Tobago	Acting President (1987)	16 Oct 1929	97 years, 37 days	10 Sep 2025
10	Gombojavyn Ochirbat	Mongolia	De facto leader of the MPR as General Secretary of the MPRP (1990)	15 Nov 1929	97 years, 7 days	15 Nov 2025
11	Alfred Moisiu	Albania	President (2002–2007)	1 Dec 1929	96 years, 356 days	9 Aug 2026
12	Lee Hyun-jae	South Korea	Prime Minister (1988)	20 Dec 1929	96 years, 337 days	14 Sep 2025
13	Ahmed Osman	Morocco	Prime Minister (1972–1979)	3 Jan 1930	96 years, 323 days	2 Nov 2026
14	Vigdís Finnbogadóttir	Iceland	President (1980–1996)	15 Apr 1930	96 years, 221 days	26 Mar 2026
15	José Sarney	Brazil	President (1985–1990)	24 Apr 1930	96 years, 212 days	26 Oct 2026
16	Chung Jai-suk	South Korea	Acting Prime Minister (1994)	5 May 1930	96 years, 201 days	27 Jun 2017
17	Kesang Choden	Bhutan	Regent (1972)	21 May 1930	96 years, 185 days	16 May 2025
18	Gonzalo Sánchez de Lozada	Bolivia	President (1993–1997; 2002–2003)	1 Jul 1930	96 years, 144 days	2 Jul 2026
19	Ivy Dumont	Bahamas	Governor-General (2001–2005) (Note: Acting Governor-General until 2002.)	2 Oct 1930	96 years, 51 days	20 Nov 2025
20	Choe Yong-rim	North Korea	Premier (2010–2013)	20 Nov 1930	96 years, 2 days	29 Jul 2026
21	William Deane	Australia	Governor-General (1996–2001)	4 Jan 1931	95 years, 322 days	24 Jun 2026
22	Takao Fujimoto	Japan	Acting Prime Minister (1997)	17 Jan 1931	95 years, 309 days	4 Apr 2023
23	Yasushi Akashi	Cambodia	Special Representative of the Secretary General (1992–1993)	19 Jan 1931	95 years, 307 days	18 Jun 2026
23	Philip Greaves	Barbados	Acting Governor-General (2017–2018)	19 Jan 1931	95 years, 307 days	12 May 2026
25	Isabel Perón	Argentina	President (1974–1976)	4 Feb 1931	95 years, 291 days	24 Mar 2026
26	Lamberto Dini	Italy	Prime Minister (1995–1996)	1 Mar 1931	95 years, 266 days	20 Mar 2026
27	Elliott Belgrave	Barbados	Governor-General (2011–2017) (Note: Acting Governor-General until 2012.)	16 Mar 1931	95 years, 251 days	22 Jan 2026
28	Raúl Castro	Cuba	President of the Council of State (2006–2018); President of the Council of Ministers (2006–2018); First Secretary of the Communist Party (2011–2021)	3 Jun 1931	95 years, 172 days	5 Sep 2026
29	Fernando Henrique Cardoso	Brazil	President (1995–2003)	18 Jun 1931	95 years, 157 days	10 Nov 2026
30	Khieu Samphan	Democratic Kampuchea	Prime Minister (1976, 1979–1982); Chairman of the State Presidium (1976–1982); Supreme Leader (1979–1982)	27 Jul 1931	95 years, 118 days	7 Aug 2025
31	Nicola Mancino	Italy	Acting President (1999)	15 Oct 1931	95 years, 38 days	15 Oct 2026
32	Chavalit Yongchaiyudh	Thailand	Prime Minister (1996–1997)	15 May 1932	94 years, 191 days	14 May 2026
33	Marguerite Pindling	Bahamas	Governor-General (2014–2019)	26 Jun 1932	94 years, 149 days	26 Jun 2025
34	Anand Panyarachun	Thailand	Prime Minister (1991–1992; 1992)	9 Aug 1932	94 years, 105 days	9 Jun 2026
35	Gavril Dejeu	Romania	Acting Prime Minister (1998)	11 Sep 1932	94 years, 72 days	24 Feb 2026
36	Vytautas Landsbergis	Lithuania	Chairman of the Supreme Council (1991–1992)	18 Oct 1932	94 years, 35 days	28 Oct 2026
37	Ugo Mifsud Bonnici	Malta	President (1994–1999)	8 Nov 1932	94 years, 14 days	12 Sep 2026
38	Kim Suk-soo	South Korea	Prime Minister (2002–2003)	20 Nov 1932	94 years, 2 days	17 Aug 2026
38	Colville Young	Belize	Governor-General (1993–2021)	20 Nov 1932	94 years, 2 days	6 Sep 2026
40	Than Shwe	Myanmar	Chairman of the State Peace and Development Council (1992–2011); Prime Minister (1992–2003); Chairman of the Union Solidarity and Development Association (1993–2011)	2 Feb 1933	93 years, 293 days	18 Nov 2025
**41**	**Paul Biya**	**Cameroon**	Prime Minister (1975–1982); **President (1982–present)**	13 Feb 1933	**93 years, 282 days**	2 Oct 2026
42	Mark Eyskens	Belgium	Prime Minister (1981)	29 Apr 1933	93 years, 207 days	15 May 2026
43	H. D. Deve Gowda	India	Prime Minister (1996–1997)	18 May 1933	93 years, 188 days	27 Oct 2026
44	Dumaagiin Sodnom	Mongolia	Chairman of the Council of Ministers (1984–1990)	14 Jul 1933	93 years, 131 days	21 Aug 2025
45	Rubén Darío Paredes	Panama	Commander of the National Guard (1982–1983)	11 Aug 1933	93 years, 103 days	22 Jun 2026
46	Arnold Koller	Switzerland	Federal Council Member (1986–1999); President (1990; 1997)	29 Aug 1933	93 years, 85 days	1 Jan 2026
47	Mátyás Szűrös	Hungary	Provisional President (1989–1990)	11 Sep 1933	93 years, 72 days	27 Oct 2025
48	Abel Pacheco	Costa Rica	President (2002–2006)	22 Dec 1933	92 years, 335 days	16 Jun 2026
49	Akihito	Japan	Emperor (1989–2019)	23 Dec 1933	92 years, 334 days	3 Sep 2026
50	Rudolf Schuster	Slovakia	President (1999–2004)	4 Jan 1934	92 years, 322 days	30 Oct 2026
51	Jean Chrétien	Canada	Prime Minister (1993–2003)	11 Jan 1934	92 years, 315 days	11 Sep 2026
52	Édith Cresson	France	Prime Minister (1991–1992)	27 Jan 1934	92 years, 299 days	26 Mar 2026
53	Giovanni Battista Re	Vatican City	Acting Sovereign (2025)	30 Jan 1934	92 years, 296 days	9 Oct 2026
54	Eddie Fenech Adami	Malta	Prime Minister (1987–1996; 1998–2004); President (2004–2009)	7 Feb 1934	92 years, 288 days	2 Apr 2026
55	Mohamed Ennaceur	Tunisia	Acting President (2019)	21 Mar 1934	92 years, 246 days	15 Oct 2025
56	J. Y. Pillay	Singapore	Acting President (2017)	30 Mar 1934	92 years, 237 days	14 Nov 2025
57	Musa Hitam	Malaysia	Acting Prime Minister (1981)	18 Apr 1934	92 years, 218 days	8 Sep 2026
58	John Malecela	Tanzania	Prime Minister (1990–1994)	19 Apr 1934	92 years, 217 days	13 Apr 2026
59	Pedro Pires	Cape Verde	Prime Minister (1975–1991); President (2001–2011)	29 Apr 1934	92 years, 207 days	25 Jun 2025
60	Monica Dacon	Saint Vincent and the Grenadines	Acting Governor-General (2002)	4 Jun 1934	92 years, 171 days	22 Sep 2023
61	Albert II	Belgium	King (1993–2013)	6 Jun 1934	92 years, 169 days	21 May 2026
62	Désiré Rakotoarijaona	Madagascar	Prime Minister (1977–1988)	19 Jun 1934	92 years, 156 days	13 Feb 2026
63	Ricardo de la Espriella	Panama	President (1982–1984)	5 Sep 1934	92 years, 78 days	11 Oct 2025
64	Apas Jumagulov	Kyrgyzstan	Prime Minister (1993–1998)	19 Sep 1934	92 years, 64 days	3 May 2025
65	Yakubu Gowon	Nigeria	Head of the Federal Military Government (1966–1975)	19 Oct 1934	92 years, 34 days	4 Sep 2026
66	Ingvar Carlsson	Sweden	Prime Minister (1986–1991; 1994–1996)	9 Nov 1934	92 years, 13 days	23 Aug 2026
66	Hamilton Green	Guyana	Prime Minister (1985–1992)	9 Nov 1934	92 years, 13 days	23 May 2026
68	Nicéphore Soglo	Benin	Acting Prime Minister (1990–1991); President (1991–1996)	29 Nov 1934	91 years, 358 days	10 Nov 2026
69	Tarcisio Bertone	Vatican City	Acting Sovereign (2013) (Note: Served as Acting Sovereign together with Cardinal-Dean Angelo Sodano.)	2 Dec 1934	91 years, 355 days	18 Jun 2026
70	Pratibha Patil	India	President (2007–2012)	19 Dec 1934	91 years, 338 days	16 Apr 2026
71	Stjepan Mesić	Yugoslavia	President of the Presidency (1991)	24 Dec 1934	91 years, 333 days	27 Mar 2026
71	Stjepan Mesić	Croatia	President (2000–2010) (Note: Mesić was also an unrecognized Prime Minister of Croatia in 1990.)	24 Dec 1934	91 years, 333 days	27 Mar 2026
72	Giovanni Lajolo	Vatican City	President of the Governorate (2006–2011)	3 Jan 1935	91 years, 323 days	24 Apr 2026
73	António Ramalho Eanes	Portugal	President of the Revolutionary Council (1976–1982); President (1976–1986)	25 Jan 1935	91 years, 301 days	17 Apr 2026
74	Michel Aoun	Lebanon	President (2016–2022) (Note: Aoun was the disputed Prime Minister of Lebanon from 1988–1990, and simultaneously also the disputed acting President.)	18 Feb 1935	91 years, 277 days	15 Sep 2026
75	Artur Rasizade	Azerbaijan	Prime Minister (1996–2003; 2003–2018) (Note: Rasizade was also Acting Prime Minister of Azerbaijan during 20 July 1996 – 26 November 1996; 18 October 1998 – 24 October 1998; and 6 August 2003 – 4 November 2003. He was acting as prime minister for the acting president, Ilham Aliyev, during 6 August 2003 – 31 October 2003.)	26 Feb 1935	91 years, 269 days	26 Feb 2026
76	Mohammed Basindawa	Yemen	Prime Minister (2011–2014)	4 Apr 1935	91 years, 232 days	26 Jan 2026
77	P. J. Patterson	Jamaica	Prime Minister (1992–2006)	10 Apr 1935	91 years, 226 days	31 Oct 2026
78	Sharavyn Gungaadorj	Mongolia	Chairman of the Council of Ministers (1990)	2 May 1935	91 years, 204 days	18 Feb 2026
79	Nemesi Marquès i Oste	Andorra	Representative of the Episcopal Co-Prince (1993–2012) (Note: Marquès was Acting Representative of the Episcopal Co-Prince during 4 May 1993 – 24 February 1994.)	17 May 1935	91 years, 189 days	12 Jun 2025
80	Léon Kengo	Zaire	First State Commissioner (1982–1986; 1988–1990); Prime Minister (1994–1997)	22 May 1935	91 years, 184 days	1 Apr 2026
81	Lee Hoi-chang	South Korea	Prime Minister (1993–1994)	2 Jun 1935	91 years, 173 days	24 May 2026
82	Leonel Mário d'Alva	São Tomé and Príncipe	Acting President (1991)	22 Jul 1935	91 years, 123 days	10 Jul 2025
83	Hifikepunye Pohamba	Namibia	President (2005–2015)	18 Aug 1935	91 years, 96 days	18 Oct 2026
84	Abdou Diouf	Senegal	Prime Minister (1970–1980); President (1981–2000)	7 Sep 1935	91 years, 76 days	7 Sep 2026
**85**	**Mahmoud Abbas**	**Palestine**	Prime Minister of the Palestinian National Authority (2003); **President of the Palestinian National Authority (2005–present)**; **State President (2005–present)**	15 Nov 1935	**91 years, 7 days**	15 Nov 2026
86	Adnan Badran	Jordan	Prime Minister (2005)	15 Dec 1935	90 years, 342 days	30 Sep 2026
87	Edward Schreyer	Canada	Governor General (1979–1984)	21 Dec 1935	90 years, 336 days	30 Apr 2025
**88**	**Salman**	**Saudi Arabia**	**King (2015–present)**; Prime Minister (2015–2022)	31 Dec 1935	**90 years, 326 days**	12 Oct 2026
89	Alejandro Maldonado	Guatemala	President (2015–2016)	6 Jan 1936	90 years, 320 days	29 May 2025
89	Julio María Sanguinetti	Uruguay	President (1985–1990; 1995–2000)	6 Jan 1936	90 years, 320 days	8 Oct 2026
91	Émile Lahoud	Lebanon	President (1998–2007)	12 Jan 1936	90 years, 314 days	26 Jun 2026
92	Ati George Sokomanu	Vanuatu	President (1980–1984; 1984–1989)	13 Jan 1936	90 years, 313 days	15 Jan 2026
93	Henri Maïdou	Central African Empire	Prime Minister (1978–1979)	14 Feb 1936	90 years, 281 days	13 Aug 2020
94	Choummaly Sayasone	Laos	General Secretary of the People's Revolutionary Party (2006–2016); President (2006–2016)	6 Mar 1936	90 years, 261 days	22 Feb 2026
95	Kennedy Simmonds	Saint Kitts and Nevis	Prime Minister (1983–1995)	12 Apr 1936	90 years, 224 days	12 Apr 2026
96	Chavarat Charnvirakul	Thailand	Acting Prime Minister (2008)	7 Jun 1936	90 years, 168 days	7 Jun 2026
97	Milan Uhde	Czechia	Acting President (1993)	28 Jul 1936	90 years, 117 days	28 Jul 2026
98	Kamuta Latasi	Tuvalu	Prime Minister (1993–1996); Acting Governor-General (2010)	4 Sep 1936	90 years, 79 days	21 Jul 2025
99	Hazem El Beblawi	Egypt	Acting Prime Minister (2013–2014)	17 Oct 1936	90 years, 36 days	30 May 2026
100	Miguel Trovoada	São Tomé and Príncipe	Prime Minister (1975–1979); President (1991–1995; 1995–2001)	27 Dec 1936	89 years, 330 days	6 Jan 2025

== Addendum ==
Currently in office

=== Uncertain date of birth ===
The following individuals might be older than #32–100 on the main list above, but their exact date of birth is uncertain.
Name	State	Position	Birth	Age	Living as of
Li Lanqing	China	Acting Premier (1998)	1932 (Note: Better citation is needed to verify his claimed DoB of 22 May 1932.)	93 years, 326 days to; 94 years, 325 days	17 Aug 2026
Severiano Tura	San Marino	Captain Regent (1985)	1934	91 years, 326 days to; 92 years, 325 days	27 Jun 2026
Al-Jazuli Daf'allah	Sudan	Prime Minister (1985–1986)	Dec 1935	90 years, 326 days to; 90 years, 356 days	29 Aug 2023
Abdallah Mohamed Kamil	Djibouti	Prime Minister (1978)	1936	89 years, 326 days to; 90 years, 325 days	1 Jun 2026

=== Unclear status as state leaders ===
The following individuals are older than #8–98 on the main list above, but their status as a state leader is unclear. (Note: They were either members of collective presidencies without a clear leader, widely recognised leaders whose true power was limited or leaders of political entities whose status as sovereign states was unclear or disputed.)
Name	State	Position	Birth	Age	Living as of
Laurie Greig	Cook Islands	Acting Queen's Representative (2000–2001)	24 Feb 1929	97 years, 271 days	23 Jun 2026
Karan Singh	Jammu and Kashmir	Prince Regent (1949–1952)	9 Mar 1931	95 years, 258 days	20 Oct 2026
Tang Fei	Taiwan	President of the Executive Yuan (2000)	15 Mar 1932	94 years, 252 days	20 Jul 2025
Lyudvig Chibirov	South Ossetia	Chairman of the Supreme Council (1993–1996); President (1996–2001)	19 Nov 1932	94 years, 3 days	19 Sep 2025
Félix Mouzabakani	Congo-Brazzaville	Member of the Provisional Government (1963) (Note: Mouzabakani, as Co-Commander of the Army, was a member of the collective interim government that took control of the Republic of the Congo during 3 days in August 1963.)	11 Mar 1934	92 years, 256 days	15 Aug 2025
Heng Samrin	Kampuchea	President of the Council of State (1979–1992); General Secretary of the People's Revolutionary Party (1981–1991)	25 May 1934	92 years, 181 days	6 Feb 2026
Dumitru Mazilu	Romania	Member of the National Salvation Front Council (1989–1990)	24 Jun 1934	92 years, 151 days	24 Dec 2021
Waldo Bernal Pereira	Bolivia	Member of the Junta of Commanders of the Armed Forces (1980); Member of the Junta of Commanders of the Armed Forces (1981)	5 Aug 1934	92 years, 109 days	30 Apr 2018
Óscar Pammo Rodríguez	Bolivia	Member of the Junta of Commanders of the Armed Forces (1981); Member of the Junta of Commanders of the Armed Forces (1982)	14 Dec 1934	91 years, 343 days	10 Oct 2023
Brian Mullooly	Ireland	Member of the Presidential Commission during vacancy (1997)	21 Feb 1935	91 years, 274 days	1 Jan 2019
Tenzin Gyatso	Tibet	Ruler (1940–1951); Head of the Tibetan government-in-exile (1959–2011)	6 Jul 1935	91 years, 139 days	21 Oct 2026
Henri de Coignac	Andorra	French Viguier (1982–1984)	3 Oct 1935	91 years, 50 days	19 Mar 2026
Hakkı Atun	Northern Cyprus	Acting President (1990); Prime Minister (1994–1996)	7 Oct 1935	91 years, 46 days	18 Oct 2025
Young Vivian	Niue	Premier (1992–1993; 2002–2008)	12 Nov 1935	91 years, 10 days	11 Jan 2023
Abdul Aziz Umar	Brunei	Acting Menteri Besar (1981–1983)	20 Mar 1936	90 years, 247 days	13 Apr 2021
**Ivonka Survilla**	**Belarusian Democratic Republic**	**President-in-exile of the Rada (1997–present)**	11 Apr 1936	**90 years, 225 days**	11 Apr 2026
Lien Chan	Taiwan	President of the Executive Yuan (1993–1997)	27 Aug 1936	90 years, 87 days	15 Jan 2026

== See also ==
- List of longest-living state leaders
- List of centenarians (politicians and civil servants)
- List of current heads of state and government
- List of current state leaders by date of assumption of office
- List of longest-reigning monarchs
- List of youngest state leaders since 1900
- List of state leaders by age
- Lists of state leaders
- Records of heads of state
- Gerontocracy
