= Government Junta of Bolivia =

A junta is a government led by a committee of, usually military, leaders. Bolivia has been ruled by multiple such bodies.

Government Junta of Bolivia may refer to:

- Government Junta of Bolivia (1861)
- Government Junta of Bolivia (1879–1880)
- Government Junta of Bolivia (1899)
- Government Junta of Bolivia (1920–1921)
- Government Junta of Bolivia (1930–1931)
- Government Junta of Bolivia (1936–1938)
- Government Junta of Bolivia (1943–1944)
- Government Junta of Bolivia (1946–1947)
- Government Junta of Bolivia (1951–1952)
- Government Junta of Bolivia (1964–1966)
- Government Junta of Bolivia (1970)
- Government Junta of Bolivia (1971)
- Government Junta of Bolivia (1980)
- Government Junta of Bolivia (1981)
- Government Junta of Bolivia (1982)

== See also ==
- Coups d'état in Bolivia
