= History of Bolivia (1964–1982) =

Period of military dictatorship

Republic of Bolivia República de Bolivia
- 1964–1982
- Flag Coat of arms
- Motto: "¡La unión es la fuerza!" (Spanish) "Unity is Strength!"
- Anthem: Himno Nacional de Bolivia (Spanish) "National Anthem of Bolivia"
- Capital: Sucre, La Paz
- Common languages: Spanish, Quechua, Aymara, Guaraní, others
- Religion: Roman Catholicism (official)
- Government: Presidential republic under a Corporatist military dictatorship
- President
  - 1964–1969: René Barrientos (first)
  - 1969: Luis Adolfo Siles Salinas
  - 1969–1970: Alfredo Ovando Candía
  - 1970–1971: Juan José Torres
  - 1971–1978: Hugo Banzer
  - 1978: Juan Pereda
  - 1978–1979: David Padilla
  - 1979: Alberto Natusch
  - 1979–1980: Lidia Gueiler
  - 1980–1981: Luis García Meza
  - 1981–1982: Celso Torrelio
  - 1982: Guido Vildoso (last)
- Vice President
  - 1964–1982: List
- Legislature: Junta of Commanders of the Armed Forces
- Historical era: Cold War
  - Coup d'état: November 4 1964
  - Disestablished: October 10 1982
- HDI (1980): 0.494 low
- Currency: Bolivian peso
- ISO 3166 code: BO
Preceded by	Succeeded by
Bolivia	Bolivia

The history of Bolivia from 1964 to 1982 is a time of periodic instability under various military dictators. On November 4, 1964, power passed from the elected leader of the Bolivian National Revolution, Víctor Paz Estenssoro, to a military junta under vice-president General René Barrientos. Barrientos was elected president in 1966 but died suspiciously in a helicopter crash in 1969 while touring the countryside and visiting the indigenous people of Bolivia. This led to a coup in September 1969 by General Ovando, who was overthrown in October 1970 by General Rogelio Miranda, who was overthrown a couple of days later by General Juan José Torres, who in turn was overthrown in August 1971 by Hugo Banzer Suárez. Banzer ruled for seven years, initially from 1971 to 1974, with the support of Estenssoro's Nationalist Revolutionary Movement. In 1974, impatient with schisms in the party, he replaced civilians with members of the armed forces and suspended political activities. The economy grew impressively during Banzer's presidency, but demands for greater political freedom undercut his support. He called elections in 1978, and Bolivia once again plunged into turmoil. Juan Pereda ruled for only four months in 1978, but his ascent to the presidency marked the beginning of an even more unstable period in Bolivian history, with nine civilian and military presidents in little over four years (1978–1982). 1982 marked the return to a democratically elected government, with Guido Vildoso as president.

== The Barrientos presidency ==
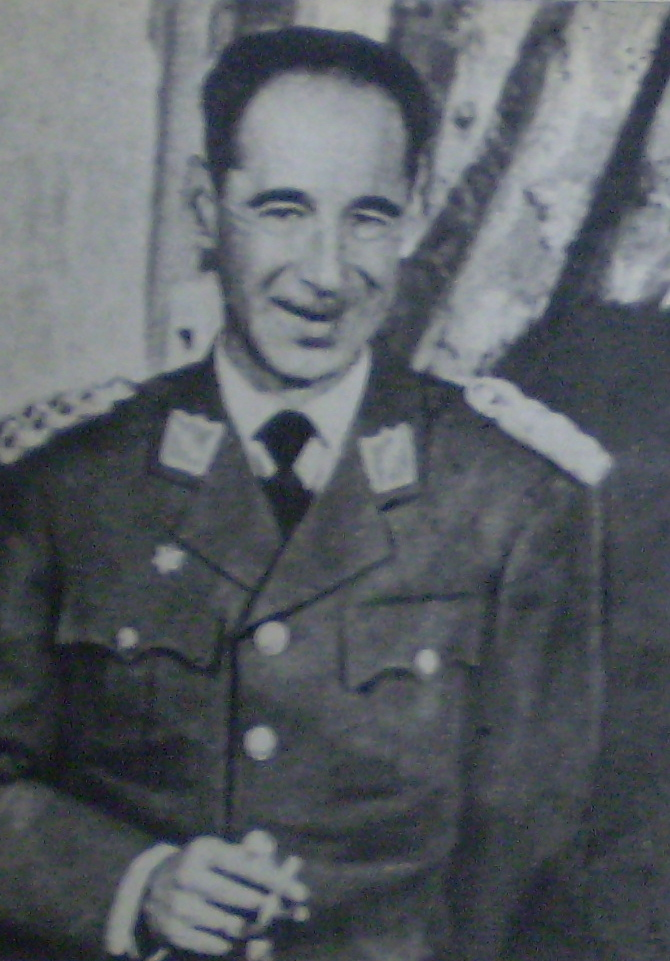
Alfredo Ovando

On November 4, 1964 René Barrientos Ortuño (president, 1964–65; co-president, May 1965 – January 1966; and president, 1966–69) and General Alfredo Ovando Candia occupied the presidential palace and declared themselves co-presidents. But as the crowd, which had gathered outside the palace, persisted in shouting its preference for the more charismatic Barrientos, Ovando allowed Barrientos to assume the formal title alone. At the same time, he occupied the post of commander in chief of the armed forces.

Barrientos, a Quechua-speaking general, insisted that his assumption of power was not a counterrevolutionary move and promised to restore the Bolivian National Revolution to its "true path", from which the Nationalist Revolutionary Movement (Movimiento Nacionalista Revolucionario, MNR) had deviated during its twelve-year rule. His government continued many of the policies of the second Víctor Paz Estenssoro administration, including the International Monetary Fund (IMF) stabilization plan and the Triangular Plan. The emphasis on reducing social costs remained in effect. In May 1965, the army forced Barrientos to accept Ovando as his co-president as a reward for suppressing an uprising by miners and factory workers.

The economy improved during the Barrientos regime at a growth rate averaging 6.5% yearly. The rise of tin prices resulted in the first profit for the Mining Corporation of Bolivia (Corporación Minera de Bolivia, Comibol) in 1966. They contributed to increased production in the medium-sized mines that had remained private. Barrientos encouraged the private sector and foreign investment and gave Gulf Oil Company permission to export petroleum and natural gas from Bolivia.

In 1966, Barrientos legitimized his rule by winning the presidential election. He formed the Popular Christian Movement (Movimiento Popular Cristiano, MPC) as his base of support. Although the MPC was unsuccessful, he won the election with a coalition of conservative politicians, the business community, and the peasants.

Barrientos's efforts to build support in the countryside succeeded at first with the signing in February 1964 of the Military-Peasant Pact (Pacto Militar-Campesino). Under the agreement, the campesino militias agreed to adopt an anti-leftist stance and to subordinate themselves to the army. However, his attempt to impose taxes on peasants resulted in a violent response and loss of support in rural areas.

Determined to keep the labor sector under control, Barrientos took away most of the gains it had achieved during the MNR's rule. He placed Comibol under the control of a military director and abolished the veto power of union leaders in management decisions. The president also cut the miners' pay to US$0.80 a day, reducing the mining workforce and the enormous Comibol bureaucracy by 10%. Finally, he destroyed the Bolivian Labor Federation (Central Obrera Boliviana, COB) and the mine workers' union, suppressed all strike activity, disarmed the miners' militias, and exiled union leaders. Military troops again occupied the mines, and in 1967 they massacred miners and their families at the Catavi-Siglo XX mines.

Barrientos could not wholly silence the labor sector; miners led the growing opposition to his rule. The various groups opposing his rule joined in denouncing Barrientos's selling of natural resources to the United States under favorable terms. They resented his invitation to United States private investment in Bolivia because he offered greater privileges to foreign investors. The defection of Barrientos's close friend and minister of interior, Colonel Antonio Arguedas, to Cuba after his announcement that he had been an agent for the United States Central Intelligence Agency (CIA) aroused national indignation. The military also resented the crucial role of United States officers in the capture and killing of Ernesto "Che" Guevara in 1967 in Bolivia, where he had tried to start a guerrilla movement.

The death of Barrientos in a helicopter crash on April 27, 1969, initially left control in the hands of his vice president, Luís Adolfo Siles Salinas (1969). Real power, however, remained with the armed forces under its commander in chief, General Ovando, who took power on September 26, 1969, in a coup that reformist officers supported.

== Revolutionary nationalism: Ovando and Torres ==
Ovando (co-president, May 1965 – January 1966, and president, January–August 1966 and 1969–70) annulled the 1970 elections, dismissed the Congress, and appointed a cabinet that included independent reformist civilians who had opposed Barrientos's policies. Ovando hoped to gain civilian and military support with a program of "revolutionary nationalism", which he had outlined in the "Revolutionary Mandate of the Armed Forces".

Revolutionary nationalism reflected the heritage and rhetoric of the military reformist regimes of the past and the spirit of the 1952 Revolution. It also showed the influence of the Peruvian government of General Juan Velasco Alvarado. Many Bolivian officers believed that the military had to intervene in politics to lead the country toward reform because civilian governments had failed in that undertaking. They were convinced that it was in the main interest of the armed forces to end underdevelopment, which they saw as the cause of insurgency. The military would, therefore, fight on the internal frontiers against social injustice and economic dependence.

Despite highly popular measures, such as the nationalization of the holdings of the Gulf Oil Company, Ovando failed to gain popular support. Popular enthusiasm over the nationalization was short-lived. Disagreement over compensation, a boycott of Bolivian crude oil on the international market, and a general economic downturn became divisive factors. Even though Ovando legalized the COB and withdrew troops from the mining camps, lasting worker support for the regime was not ensured. Frustrated expectations, broken promises, and the massacre of miners by the military in Catavi in 1967 had radicalized the workers, who now refused to cooperate with the military government.

While the left became radicalized, the right became weary of Ovando's vacillating statements, which included the suggestion that private property be abolished. Even when Ovando moved right during the last months of his regime, he was unable to enlist the support of the conservative groups in the country because this move only emphasized his weakness.

Ovando's reform program also polarized the military. Reformist officers, concerned about the decline in popular support for the military since the Barrientos regime, shifted their support to the more radical General Juan José Torres (1970–71), whom Ovando had dismissed as his commander in chief, the right backed General Rogelio Miranda.

The chaos surrounding the overthrow of Ovando highlighted the division in the armed forces. Military officers demanded the resignation of Ovando and Miranda after a failed coup attempt by the latter on October 5, 1970. A triumvirate, formed on October 6, failed to consolidate support. On October 7, as the country moved toward civil war after the COB had declared a general strike, General Torres emerged as the compromise candidate and became president of Bolivia.

The main feature of Torres's presidency was a lack of authority. Rather than taking the initiative on policies, Torres primarily reacted to pressure from different groups. His minister of interior, Jorge Gallardo Lozada, labeled the Torres government the "ten months of emergency".

Torres hoped to retain civilian support by moving to the left. He nationalized some United States property, such as the waste-processing operation of the Catavi tin mines and the Matilde zinc mine, and he ordered the Peace Corps, a United States program, out of Bolivia. While limiting United States influence in Bolivia, Torres increased cooperation with the Soviet Union and its allies in the economic and technical sectors.

However, because of his lack of a clear strategy and political experience, Torres soon alienated all sectors of Bolivian society. He found it difficult to organize groups on the left because they confronted him with demands he could not meet, such as giving them half of all cabinet seats. The workers, students, and parties of the left wanted a socialist state and saw the Torres government only as a step in that direction. In June 1970, the Torres regime established the Popular Assembly (Asamblea Popular) in an attempt to form an alternative popular government. Consisting mainly of representatives of workers' and peasants' organizations, the Popular Assembly was intended to serve as a base for the radical transformation of society. However, the left remained divided by ideological differences and rivalry for leadership. They could not agree on controversial issues dealing with full worker participation in state and private enterprises, the creation of armed militias, and the establishment of popular tribunals having legal jurisdiction over crimes against the working class. No consensus was achieved, and many delegates, resenting the lack of power to enforce the resolutions and running short of funds, returned home prematurely. The Popular Assembly did, however, succeed in weakening the government by creating a climate in which popular organizations acted independently from the state.

Torres's hope of placating conservative opposition by avoiding radical change did not win him the support of the right, especially of the powerful business community. Conservative groups unified in their opposition because they saw a chance for a political comeback in alliance with rightist officers. The military, in turn, became increasingly polarized because of their discontent with Torres's chaotic leadership. Torres had cut the defense budget to free money for education and allowed civilian interference in strictly military matters. He often permitted military disobedience to go unpunished. The last step of institutional decay was a manifesto written during the last weeks of the Torres regime by a group of junior officers who questioned military authority. It resulted in widespread military support for the coup on August 21, 1971, by Colonel Hugo Banzer Suárez, the former Military Academy commander whom Torres had exiled.

== The Banzer regime ==
Colonel Hugo Banzer (1971–78), a highly respected officer who had repeatedly attempted to overthrow the regime of Juan José Torres, ruled for six years, one of the longest continuous presidential terms in recent Bolivian history. Banzer's presidency was characterized by relative political stability and unprecedented economic growth. At first, he was supported by the Nationalist Popular Front (Frente Popular Nacionalista, FPN), an alliance between the MNR under Paz Estenssoro, who was allowed to return from exile in Lima, and the Bolivian Socialist Falange (Falange Socialista Boliviana, FSB) under Mario Gutiérrez. Both parties had been enemies until the chaos of the Torres regime gave them a chance for a political comeback in alliance with conservative elements in the armed forces.

During the first years of the Banzer presidency, the economy improved rapidly. Exports tripled between 1970 and 1974 because of increased production of petroleum, natural gas, and tin, which was then refined in Bolivian smelters. The production of cotton in the Santa Cruz area in eastern Bolivia also tripled between 1970 and 1975.

Despite this economic growth, Bolivia reverted to the repression of earlier regimes. The new minister of interior, Colonel Andrés Sélich, ordered a massive crackdown on the left, abolishing labor unions and closing the universities. The government brutally suppressed a general strike against the devaluation of the Bolivian peso in 1972. In 1974, price increases for basic goods and control of food prices resulted in roadblocks by peasants in the Cochabamba Valley and their subsequent massacre by the military.

The governing alliance disintegrated almost immediately when the MNR and the FSB split. They proved unreliable in supporting Banzer because only minor factions remained in the FPN. The armed forces were also divided, and various factions tried to overthrow the regime. On June 5, 1974, younger officers belonging to the Generational Group (Grupo Generacional) and led by General Gary Prado Salmón attempted a coup, demanding that Banzer legitimize his rule. It failed, however, as did another on November 7 that was supported by military, MNR, and FSB elements in Santa Cruz.

The November 7, 1974 coup has been called an auto-golpe (self-coup) because it gave Banzer a reason to rule without civilian interference. Influenced by the Brazilian model, he announced the complete reorganization of the Bolivian political system and the formation of a "new Bolivia" under military rule. Banzer hoped to keep the support of the business community, the mine owners, the agricultural entrepreneurs in Santa Cruz, and the growing number of loyal bureaucrats.

The government, however, soon began to face serious problems. The "economic miracle" turned out to be a myth; petroleum production declined sharply, and Comibol produced at a loss, despite high mineral prices, because it was subsidizing other state agencies. Cotton production also declined when world prices fell.

The stability of the Banzer regime was superficial because the military remained divided by personal rivalry, ideological differences, and a generational gap. Growing civilian opposition was centered in the labor sector despite the renewed military occupation of the mines. Radical students and the progressive sector of the Roman Catholic Church became spokespersons for the oppressed groups; the peasants also criticized the government.

External factions contributed to the weakening of the Banzer regime as well. The negotiation with Chile for an outlet to the sea had raised hopes in 1974. When an agreement between Banzer and General Augusto Pinochet Ugarte failed because of the opposition of Chilean nationalists, Banzer's position was weakened. After Jimmy Carter assumed the United States presidency in 1976, the United States pressured Banzer to hold elections.

In 1977, with mounting opposition from civilian groups and the military and increasing pressure from the United States, Banzer announced a presidential election for 1980, hoping to remain in control. However, labor unrest and hostility to his regime forced him to set a date for 1978.

General Juan Pereda Asbún, Banzer's handpicked candidate, carried out a coup in July 1978 after the National Electoral Court annulled the elections because of widespread fraud by Pereda's supporters. Although Bolivia continued under military rule, the 1978 general election marked the beginning of Bolivia's traumatic transition to democracy during the following four years.

== Transition to democracy ==
Between 1978 and 1980, Bolivia was constantly in a state of crisis. The fragmentation of political forces made it impossible for any party to dominate. In the three elections held during this period, no party achieved a majority, and alliances of various groups could not break the deadlock. Social unrest increased as peasants began to agitate again on a large scale for the first time since their rebellion in the late colonial period. The Bolivian workers were more radical than ever. In 1979, during the first congress of the Bolivian Labor Federation (Central Obrera Boliviana, COB) since 1970, they vehemently protested the economic austerity measures dictated by the International Monetary Fund (IMF).

The division in the armed forces and the increasing visibility of paramilitary groups reflected the institutional decay of the military. A civilian investigation into human rights violations committed during the Banzer regime further demoralized the officer corps.

Despite his promise after four months in office, General Pereda did not call for elections. In November 1978, he was overthrown in a bloodless coup by General David Padilla Arancibia, who was supported by the younger institutionalist faction of the military. Arancibia saw the main role of the military as the defense of the country rather than political intervention and announced elections for 1979 without naming an official government candidate. Electoral reforms simplified voter registration, and 90% of the electorate chose among eight presidential candidates in honest elections.

=== 1979 election, Guevara presidency, and Natusch coup ===
When none of the primary presidential candidates gained a majority in the general election the following July, and the National Congress of Bolivia was equally unable to elect a president, it appointed former Revolutionary Nationalist Movement head Walter Guevara Arze as interim president for a year, beginning on August 8, 1979. This was the first civilian regime since the brief term of Luís Adolfo Siles Salinas in 1969.

However, Guevara was overthrown after a few months by a bloody coup under Colonel Alberto Natusch Busch in November 1979. Natusch stepped down after just two weeks because of intense civilian opposition, his limited military support, and diplomatic action by the United States to prevent recognition of the Natusch government.

=== Gueiler interim presidency, 1980 election, and military juntas ===
Lidia Gueiler Tejada was appointed interim president on November 16, 1979. Gueiler was head of the Chamber of Deputies and a veteran Revolutionary Nationalist Movement politician and became the first female leader of Bolivia. The following June, Gueiler presided over the 1980 Bolivian general election, the third in three years. The parties of the left gained a clear majority of the vote. Although no presidential candidate secured a majority of the popular vote, former president Hernán Siles Zuazo and his Democratic and Popular Unity (Unidad Democrática y Popular, UDP) coalition alone got 38% of the votes; Siles was thus favored to win the presidency by congressional ballot on August 6, 1980.

The congressional ballot process was disrupted on July 17, 1980, by the violent military coup of General Luis García Meza, cousin of the deposed president Gueiler, who fled the country. Reportedly financed by cocaine traffickers such as Roberto Suárez Gómez and supported by European mercenaries recruited by Klaus Barbie, former Gestapo chief in Lyon, and Stefano Delle Chiaie, Italian neo-fascist, the coup began the rule of the first Junta of Commanders of the Armed Forces, one of the darkest periods in Bolivian history. Arbitrary arrest by paramilitary units, torture, and disappearances, with the assistance of Argentine advisers, destroyed the opposition. Government involvement in cocaine trafficking resulted in international isolation for Bolivia. Cocaine exports reportedly totaled US$850 million in the 1980–81 period of the García Meza regime, twice the value of official government exports. The "coca dollars" were used to buy military officers' silence or active support. But García Meza, who failed to gain support in the military, faced repeated coup attempts and was pressured to resign on August 4, 1981.

The ruthlessness, extreme corruption, and international isolation of the García Meza government completely demoralized and discredited the military; many officers wanted to return to democracy. However, the second Junta of Commanders of the Armed forces (led by General Celso Torrelio Villa) was reluctant to call for elections.

=== Vildoso reconvenes the 1980 congress ===
In July 1982, after yet another attempt by the García Meza clique to return to power, a third Junta of Commanders of the Armed Forces appointed General Guido Vildoso Calderón as de facto president and entrusted him with returning the country to democratic rule.

Rather than calling a new election, Vildoso decided to reconvene the 1980 Congress and respect the results of that year's presidential contest. When Congress reconvened on September 23, 1982, one of its first acts was to reconfirm the 1980 election results, which showed former president Hernán Siles well ahead, though short of a majority. In October, Congress overwhelmingly elected Siles, who assumed the presidency on October 10, 1982.
