= Junta of Commanders of the Armed Forces 1971 (Bolivia) =

The Junta of Commanders of the Armed Forces (1971) was a military junta which ruled Bolivia from August 21, 1971 through August 22, 1971 and consisted of junta chairmen Andrés Selich Chop, Hugo Banzer, Jaime Florentino Mendieta Vargas. This junta came to power after a coup d'etat and removal of President Juan José Torres.

This junta was dissolved with Hugo Banzer becoming 62nd President of Bolivia.

== Resources ==
Preceded by Juan José Torres	Presidency; 1971	Succeeded by Hugo Banzer
