= Cabinet of Luis García Meza =

The High Command of the Military of Bolivia entrusted General Luis García Meza Tejada with the Presidency on 18 July 1980, and he formed his cabinet.

Ministry / Date	18.07.1980	21.10.1980	25.02.1981	30.06.1981	01.07.1981
Foreign and Religious Affaire	Javier Cerruto Calderón, mil		Mario Rolón Anaya, ADN		
Interior, Migration and Justice	Luis Arce Gómez, mil		Celso Torrelio Villa, mil	Jorge Salazar Crespo, mil	
National Defense	Armando Reyes Villa, mil				
Finance	José Sánchez Calderón, mil		Jorge Tamayo Ramos, ADN		
Planning and Co-ordination	Oscar Larraín Frontanilla, mil				
Education and Culture	Ariel Coca Ramírez, mil		Guillermo Escobar Uhry, mil		
Labor and Union Affairs	Augusto Calderon Miranda, mil		Rolando Canido Berascochea, mil		
Industry, Commerce and Tourism	Mario Guzman Moreno, mil				
Transport and Communications	Rene Guzmán Fortun, mil				
Mining and Metallurgy	Carlos Morales Nuñez del Prado, mil				
Energy and Hydrocarbons	Lider Sossa Salazar, mil				
Agriculture and Peasant Affairs	Julio Molina Suarez, mil				
Health and Social Security	Avelino Rivero Parada, mil		Jose Villarreal Suárez, ind		
Housing and Urbanism	Arturo Veizaga Barron, mil		José Sánchez Calderón, mil		
Aviation	no	Wáldo Bernal Pereira, mil			
Economic Integration	Francisco Mariaca Salas, mil		Alberto Saenz Klinsky, ADN		
Press, Information and Sports	Fernando Palacios Urquizo, mil				
Secretary to the Cabinet	Mario Escobari Guerra, mil		Jorge Salazar Crespo, mil		Marcelo Galindo de Ugarte, ind

mil – military

ind – independent

ADN – Nationalist Democratic Action
