= Government of the Junta of Commanders of the Armed Forces, 1981 =

The Junta of Commanders of the Armed Forces ruled Bolivia from 4 August 1981 through 4 September 1981. On 11 August 1981 the Junta formed a new cabinet.

| Ministry / Date | 11.08.1981 | 18.08.1981 |
|---|---|---|
| Foreign and Religious Affaire | Mario Rolón Anaya, ADN | |
| Interior, Migration and Justice | Rolando Canido Vericochea, mil | |
| National Defense | Armando Reyes Villa, mil | |
| Finance | Javier Alcoreza Melgarejo, mil | |
| Planning and Co-ordination | Adolfo Linares Arraya, MNR | |
| Education and Culture | Guillermo Escobar Uhry, mil | |
| Labor and Union Affairs | Guido Suárez Castellón, mil | |
| Industry, Commerce and Tourism | Lucio Paz Rivero, ADN | |
| Transport and Communications | René Guzmán Fortun, mil | |
| Mining and Metallurgy | Carlos Morales Núñez Del Prado, mil | |
| Energy and Hydrocarbons | | Jorge Zamora Mujia, ind |
| Agriculture and Peasant Affairs | Julio Molina Suárez, mil | |
| Health and Social Security | José Villarreal Suárez, ind | |
| Housing and Urbanism | Edmundo Pereyra Torrico, mil | |
| Economic Integration | Edgar Millares Reyes, FSB | |
| Press, Information and Sports | Guillermo Céspedes Rivera, ind | |
| Aviation | Natalio Morales Mosquera, mil | |
| Secretary to the Cabinet | Juan Carlos Durán Saucedo, MNR | |

mil – military

ind – independent

MNR – Revolutionary Nationalist Movement

FSB – Bolivian Socialist Falange

ADN – Nationalist Democratic Action
