= Luis García Meza =

57th President of Bolivia (1980–1981)

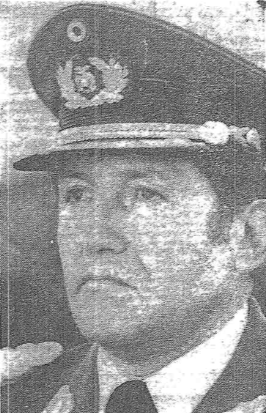

57th President of Bolivia
- In office 17 July 1980 – 4 August 1981
- Vice President: Vacant
- Preceded by: Lidia Gueiler (interim)
- Succeeded by: Celso Torrelio

Personal details
- Born: Luis Arturo García Meza Tejada; 8 August 1929 La Paz, Bolivia
- Died: 29 April 2018 (aged 88) La Paz, Bolivia
- Spouse(s): Eldy Carvallo; Olma Cabrera
- Children: 3
- Parent(s): Luis García Meza Crespo; Alicia Tejada
- Relatives: José Luis Tejada Sorzano (uncle); Lidia Gueiler (cousin)
- Education: Military College of the Army

Military service
- Allegiance: Bolivia
- Branch/service: Bolivian Army
- Years of service: 1952–1981
- Rank: General

Luis Arturo García Meza Tejada (8 August 1929 – 29 April 2018) was a Bolivian military officer who served as the 57th president of Bolivia from 1980 to 1981. He was a dictator convicted of human rights violations and leader of a violent coup. A native of La Paz, he was a career military officer who rose to the rank of general during the dictatorship of Hugo Banzer (1971–78).

== Prelude to dictatorship ==
García Meza graduated from the military academy in 1952, and served as its commander from 1963 to 1964. He then rose to division commander in the late 1970s.

He became the leader of the right-wing faction of the military of Bolivia most disenchanted with the return to civilian rule. Many of the officers involved had been part of the Hugo Banzer dictatorship and disliked the investigation of economic and human rights abuses by the new Bolivian congress. Moreover, they tended to regard the decline in popularity of the Carter administration in the United States as an indicator that soon a Republican administration would replace it—one more amenable to the kind of pro-US, more hardline anti-communist dictatorship they wanted to reinstall in Bolivia. Many allegedly had ties to cocaine traffickers and made sure portions of the military acted as their enforcers/protectors in exchange for extensive bribes, which in turn were used to fund the upcoming coup. In this manner, the narcotraffickers were in essence purchasing for themselves the upcoming Bolivian government.

== Coup d'état ==
This group pressured President Lidia Gueiler (his cousin) to install General García Meza as Commander of the Army. Within months, the Junta of Commanders headed by García Meza forced a violent coup d'état, sometimes referred to as the Cocaine Coup, of 17 July 1980, when several Bolivian intellectuals such as Marcelo Quiroga Santa Cruz were killed. When portions of the citizenry resisted, as they had done in the failed putsch of November 1979, it resulted in dozens of deaths. Many were tortured. Allegedly, the Argentine Army unit Batallón de Inteligencia 601 participated in the coup.

== Dictatorship (1980–1981) ==
Of rightwing ultra-conservative anti-communist persuasion, García Meza endeavored to bring a Pinochet-style dictatorship that was intended to last 20 years. He immediately outlawed all political parties, exiled opposition leaders, repressed trade unions and muzzled the press. He was backed by the Argentinian military junta and the Italian neofascist Stefano Delle Chiaie. Further collaboration came from other European neofascists, most notoriously Spanish Ernesto Milá Rodríguez (accused of the 1980 Paris synagogue bombing). Among other foreign collaborators were professional torturers allegedly imported from the notoriously repressive Argentine dictatorship of General Jorge Videla.

The García Meza regime, while brief (its original form ended in 1981), became internationally known for its extreme brutality. The population was repressed in the same ways as under the Banzer dictatorship. In January 1981, the Council on Hemispheric Affairs named the García Meza regime, "Latin America's most errant violator of human rights after Guatemala and El Salvador." Some 1,000 people are estimated to have been killed by the Bolivian Army and security forces in only 13 months. The administration's chief repressor was the Minister of Interior, Colonel Luis Arce, who cautioned that all Bolivians who opposed the new order should "walk around with their written will under their arms."

The most prominent victim of the dictatorship was the congressman, presidential candidate, and gifted orator Marcelo Quiroga, murdered and "disappeared" soon after the coup. Quiroga had been the chief advocate of bringing to trial the former dictator, General Hugo Banzer (who was in power from 1971 until 1978), for human right violations and economic mismanagement.

=== Drug trafficking ===
The García Meza government's drug trafficking activities led to the complete isolation of the regime. In contrast to his position regarding the other military dictatorships in Latin America, the new conservative U.S. President Ronald Reagan kept his distance, as the regime's unsavory links to criminal circles became more public. Eventually, the international outcry was sufficiently strong to force García Meza's resignation on 3 August 1981. He was succeeded by a less tainted but equally repressive general, Celso Torrelio.

The Bolivian military sustained itself in power only for another year, and then withdrew from civilian politics, embarrassed and tarnished by the excesses of the 1980–82 dictatorships.

== Exile and jail ==
García Meza left the country but was tried and convicted in absentia for the serious human rights violations committed by his regime. On March 14, 1995, he was extradited to Bolivia from Brazil and was given a 30-year prison sentence, at the San Pedro penitentiary in La Paz, the very same penitentiary where he once kept his enemies. His main collaborator, Colonel Arce, was extradited to the United States, where he served a prison sentence for drug trafficking.

García Meza had reportedly been living in considerable comfort whilst in prison, with a barbecue, a gym, and a telephone at his disposal, in addition with a sauna and the occupation of three cells. These privileges were later revoked in response to protests from human rights organisations and victims.

== Death ==
García Meza died at the Cossmil military hospital, where he was serving the remainder of his 30-year prison term in La Paz on April 29, 2018, of a heart attack at the age of 88.

== See also ==
- Cabinet of Luis García Meza
- Roberto Suárez Goméz

Political offices
Preceded by Lidia Gueiler; Interim	President of Bolivia; 1980–1981	Vacant Government Junta Title next held by Celso Torrelio
