= Cabinet of Celso Torrelio =

The High Command of the Military of Bolivia entrusted General Celso Torrelio Villa with the Presidency on 4 September 1981, and on 7 September 1981 he formed his cabinet.

Ministry / Date	07.09.1981	05.04.1982
Foreign and Religious Affaire	Gonzalo Romero Álvarez García, FSB	
Interior, Migration and Justice	Romulo Mercado Garnica, mil	
National Defense	Armando Reyes Villa, mil	Jorge Echazú Aguirre, mil
Finance	Javier Alcoreza Melgarejo, mil	Lucio Paz Rivero, ADN
Planning and Co-ordination	Adolfo Linares Arraya, MNR	
Education and Culture	Juan Vera Antezana, mil	
Labor and Union Affairs	Guido Suárez Castellón, mil	
Industry, Commerce and Tourism	Lucio Paz Rivero, ADN	Luis Palenque Cordero, MNR
Transport and Communications	Hector Caballero Cardozo, mil	Gildo Angulo Cabrera, mil
Mining and Metallurgy	Carlos Morales Nunez Del Prado, mil	
Energy and Hydrocarbons	Jorge Zamora Mujia, ind	William Mackenny Velasco, ind
Agriculture and Peasant Affairs	Carlos Villarroel Navia, mil	
Health and Social Security	Arnold Hofman Bang Soleto, ind	
Housing and Urbanism	Edmundo Pereyra Torrico, mil	Raúl Otermin Rodriguez, ind
Economic Integration	Edgar Millares Reyes, FSB	
Press, Information and Sports	Jaime Humerez Seleme, PSC	Mario Marañon Zárate, ind
Aviation	Natalio Morales Mosquera, mil	
Secretary to the Cabinet	Juan Carlos Durán Saucedo, MNR	

mil – military

ind – independent

MNR – Revolutionary Nationalist Movement

FSB – Bolivian Socialist Falange

ADN – Nationalist Democratic Action

PSC – Social Christian Party
