= Guido Vildoso =

59th President of Bolivia

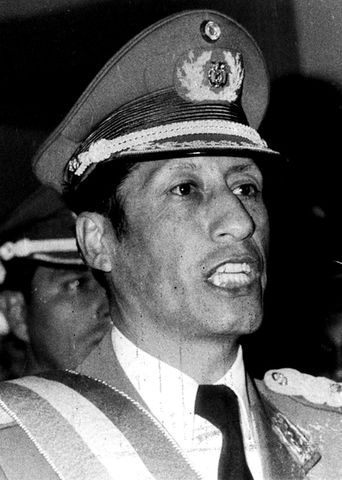

59th President of Bolivia
- In office 21 July 1982 – 10 October 1982
- Vice President: Vacant
- Preceded by: Celso Torrelio
- Succeeded by: Hernán Siles Zuazo

Minister of Social Security and Health
- In office 9 November 1976 – 21 July 1978
- President: Hugo Banzer
- Preceded by: Jorge Torrez Navarro
- Succeeded by: Oscar Román Vaca

Personal details
- Born: Guido Hernán Vildoso Calderón; 5 April 1937 (age 89) La Paz, Bolivia
- Parent(s): Dilipio Vildoso Rejas; Etelvina Calderón Meruvia
- Education: Military College of the Army

General Guido Hernán Vildoso Calderón (born 5 April 1937) is a Bolivian retired military officer who served as the 59th president of Bolivia from July to October 1982. He was the last president installed by the military.

== Biography ==
Born in La Paz on 5 April 1937, Vildoso joined the Bolivian armed forces and took specialized courses in Brazil, Panama, and the United States. In the 1970s he served in the cabinet of military dictator Hugo Banzer. Vildoso was second in command in the Bolivian Army when, in July 1982, he was entrusted by his peers with the task of extricating the military from power and returning the country to constitutional, democratic rule after a period of several dictatorships. His appointment followed the highly unpopular 1980–82 dictatorships of Luis García Meza and Celso Torrelio.

=== Presidency (1982) ===
Vildoso became president of Bolivia on 21 July 1982. Faced with a grave social, economic and fiscal crisis, Vildoso accelerated the re-democratization process. He and his fellow commanders essentially had two options: call new elections, or to reconvene the 1980 Congress and respect the results of that year's presidential contest. When it became apparent that the country would crumble into civil war before new elections could be held, Vildoso's junta recalled the 1980 Congress and promised to accept its choice of president. Congress reconvened on 23 September, and its virtual first act was to reconfirm the 1980 election results, which showed former president Hernán Siles Zuazo well ahead, though short of a majority. On 5 October, Congress overwhelmingly elected Siles as president.

Vildoso returned the presidential emblems to Congress on October 10, 1982, thus closing the door on military control of Bolivia. This gesture allowed Siles to formally take office later that day. Nonetheless, Vildoso and his cabinet were loudly booed by the population present at the transfer of power to Siles. The Bolivian Congress did later acknowledge Vildoso for his two main accomplishments: restoring democracy to Bolivia with no bloodshed and developing the fundamentals of the economic plan, 21060, that was later used by President Víctor Paz Estenssoro to restore sound macroeconomic variables to the nation.

== Post-presidency (1982–present) ==
After the handover of authority, Vildoso retired from the military and currently lives in Cochabamba. To date, he is the last non-constitutional ruler of the country.

== See also ==
- Cabinet of Guido Vildoso

Political offices
Preceded by Jorge Torrez Navarro	Minister of Social Security and Health; 1976–1978	Vacant Title next held by Oscar Román Vaca
Vacant Government Junta Title last held by Celso Torrelio	President of Bolivia; 1981	Succeeded by Hernán Siles Zuazo
