= Junta of Commanders of the Armed Forces 1970 (Bolivia) =

The Junta of Commanders of the Armed Forces (1970) was a military junta which ruled Bolivia from October 6, 1970 through October 7, 1970 and consisted of Efraín Guachalla Ibáñez, Fernando Sattori Ribera, Alberto Albarracín Crespo. This junta came to power after a coup d'etat and its removal of President Alfredo Ovando.

This junta was dissolved with Juan José Torres becoming de facto President of Bolivia until August 21, 1971.

== Resources ==
Preceded by Alfredo Ovando Candía	Presidency; 1970	Succeeded by Juan José Torres
