= Fernando Eloy Guachalla =

Bolivian president-elect (1908)

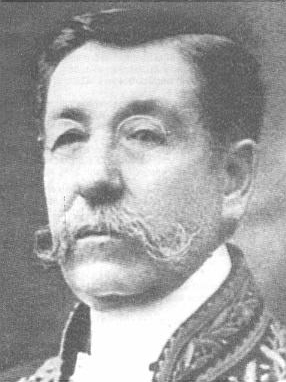
Gauchalla in 1899–1900

Fernando Eloy Guachalla (1853 – July 24, 1908) was a Bolivian politician who was president-elect of Bolivia after winning the 1908 presidential election, but who died before taking office. He was foreign minister of Bolivia from 1899 to 1900. He was leader of the Liberal Party.

Guachalla won the 1908 Bolivian presidential election, which was held in June 1908.
