= Cabinet of Guido Vildoso =

The High Command of the Military of Bolivia entrusted General Guido Vildoso Calderón with the Presidency on 21 July 1982, and he formed his cabinet.

| Ministry / Date | 21.07.1982 | 29.07.1982 | 05.10.1982 |
|---|---|---|---|
| Foreign and Religious Affairs | Agustín Saavedra Weise, AND | | |
| Interior, Migration and Justice | Edgar Rojas Ruiz, mil | | |
| National Defense | Alfredo Villarroel Barja, mil | | |
| Finance | Alfonso Revollo Tennier, MNR | | |
| Planning and Co-ordination | Amadeó Saldías Cordero, mil | | |
| Education and Culture | Marcelo Calvo Valda, FSB | | |
| Labor and Union Affairs | Julio Villagomez Vargas, mil | | |
| Industry, Commerce and Tourism | Jorge Escobar Sanchez, mil | Raúl Soria Ruíz, ind | |
| Transport and Communications | Douglas Estremadoiro Garcia, mil | | |
| Mining and Metallurgy | Octavio Villavicencio Quintanilla, mil | | |
| Energy and Hydrocarbons | Augusto Sanchez Valle, mil | | |
| Agriculture and Peasant Affairs | Victor Hugo Balderrama Casanovas, mil | | |
| Health and Social Security | Dorian Gorena Urizar, ind | | |
| Housing | Manuel Lujan Alba, mil | | |
| Economic Integration | José Antonio Oña Costas, mil | | |
| Press, Information and Sports | Hugo Gonzalez Rioja, MNR | Luis Peñaranda Beltrán, MNR | |
| Aviation | | | Natalio Morales Mosquera, mil |
| Secretary to the Cabinet | Alfredo Careaga Guereca, ind | | |

mil – military

ind – independent

MNR – Revolutionary Nationalist Movement

FSB – Bolivian Socialist Falange

AND – Nationalist Democratic Action
