= Junta of Commanders of the Armed Forces 1980 (Bolivia) =

The Junta of Commanders of the Armed Forces (1980) was a military junta which ruled Bolivia for the date of July 18, 1980 after the overthrow of President Lidia Gueiler Tejada on July 17, 1980.

The junta consisted of General Luis García Meza Tejada, General Waldo Bernal Pereira, Commander of the Bolivian Air Force and General Ramiro Terrazas Rodríguez. In December 1980, in a televised interview, General Waldo Bernal Pereira, member of the Junta, declared that “some day, there will be elections.”

Lidia Gueiler Tejada left the country and lived in France until the fall of the dictatorship in 1982.

Gen. Luis García Meza Tejada would become Bolivia's President/dictator from July 18, 1980, through August 4, 1981 when the Junta of Commanders of the Armed Forces (1981) came into power.

== Resources ==
Preceded by Lydia Gueiler Tejada	Presidency; 1980	Succeeded by Luis García Meza Tejada
