= Víctor González Fuentes =

Former president of Bolivia

Víctor González Fuentes was de facto president of Bolivia for less than a day, and is a former military general and a member of the military junta that ruled the country from 1971 to 1978. The junta included Juan Pereda, David Padilla, Wálter Guevara, Alberto Natusch, and Lydia Gueiler Tejada. Fuentes was Chairman of that junta for July 21, 1978.

Prior to control of Bolivia, he was a signatory of the 1975 Decree Law No. 12760 during the presidency of Hugo Banzer.

Political offices
Preceded by Hugo Banzer	President of Bolivia; 1978	Succeeded by Juan Pereda
