= Celso Torrelio =

58th President of Bolivia

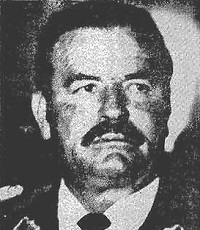

58th President of Bolivia
- In office 4 September 1981 – 19 July 1982; Junta: 4 August 1981 – 4 September 1981
- Vice President: Vacant
- Preceded by: Luis García Meza
- Succeeded by: Guido Vildoso

Minister of Interior, Migration, and Justice
- In office 26 February 1981 – 30 June 1981
- President: Luis García Meza
- Preceded by: Luis Arce Gómez
- Succeeded by: Jorge Salazar Crespo

Personal details
- Born: Celso Torrelio Villa; 3 June 1933 Padilla, Chuquisaca, Bolivia
- Died: 23 April 1999 (aged 65) La Paz, Bolivia
- Spouse: Teresa Pacheco
- Parent(s): Abel Torrelio; Estefania Villa
- Education: Military College of the Army

Celso Torrelio Villa (3 June 1933 – 23 April 1999) was a military general and a member of the Junta of Commanders of the Armed Forces (1981), who served as the de facto 58th president of Bolivia from 1981 to 1982.

A native of Padilla, department of Chuquisaca, Torrelio joined the Bolivian Army and rose to the rank of general. He served as the notorious dictator Luis García Meza's Minister of Interior after the departure, forced by Washington, of the equally-infamous Colonel Luis Arce. The García Meza regime became internationally known for its extreme brutality. Some 1,000 people are estimated to have been killed by the Bolivian army and security forces between July 1980 and August 1981. In addition, the García Meza government was deeply involved in drug trafficking activities, and may have come to power financed directly by the drug cartels. This led to the complete isolation of the regime. Even the new conservative government of U.S. President Ronald Reagan kept its distance and seemed to prefer better options. Eventually, the international outcry was sufficiently strong to force García Meza's resignation on 3 August 1981. The high command of the Military of Bolivia at that point entrusted General Celso Torrelio with the presidency.

Although the military's idea was to replace the polarizing García Meza with a less controversial and more acceptable leader equally committed to the principles of the anti-communist National Security Doctrine, their plan did not come to fruition. The regime continued to be shunned internationally and despised domestically. Furthermore, a very grave economic crisis loomed on the horizon, the result of years of mismanagement, a global recession, and the onset of the Latin American debt crisis. Faced with the choices of mounting a fresh repressive campaign to re-equilibrate the reeling regime (with the increased international isolation such a move would entail) or call elections, the high command chose the latter. In July 1982, General Torrelio was replaced with General Guido Vildoso, who was charged with returning the country to democratic rule. Torrelio then retired and did not return to play any role in Bolivian politics.

Torrelio was replaced by the Junta of Commanders of the Armed Forces (1982).

== See also ==
- Cabinet of Celso Torrelio

== Sources ==
- Prado Salmón, Gral. Gary. "Poder y Fuerzas Armadas, 1949-1982."

Political offices
Preceded by Luis Arce Gómez	Minister of Interior, Migration, and Justice; 1981	Succeeded by Jorge Salazar Crespo
Vacant Government Junta Title last held by Luis García Meza	President of Bolivia; 1981–1982	Vacant Government Junta Title next held by Guido Vildoso
