= Junta of Commanders of the Armed Forces 1982 (Bolivia) =

The Junta of Commanders of the Armed Forces (1982) was a military junta which ruled Bolivia from July 19, 1982, through July 21, 1982, and consisted of General Natalio Morales Mosquera, Bolivian Navy Rear Admiral Óscar Jaime Pammo, and General Ángel Mariscal Gómez. This junta replaced President Celso Torrelio.

This junta was dissolved with Guido Vildoso becoming de facto President of Bolivia until October 10, 1982.

== Resources ==
Preceded by Celso Torrelio	Presidency; 1982	Succeeded by Guido Vildoso
