= Junta of Commanders of the Armed Forces 1981 (Bolivia) =

The Junta of Commanders of the Armed Forces (1981) was a military junta which ruled Bolivia from August 4, 1981, through September 4, 1981 and consisted of Commander of the Bolivian Air Force, General Waldo Bernal Pereira; General of the Bolivian Army, Celso Torrelio; and Óscar Pammo Rodríguez, a Rear Admiral in the Bolivian Navy. This junta was preceded by President Luis García Meza Tejada.

This junta was dissolved with Celso Torrelio being named by the junta as President of Bolivia until July 21, 1982.

== See also ==
- Government of the Junta of Commanders of the Armed Forces, 1981

Preceded by Luis García Meza	Presidency; 1981	Succeeded by Celso Torrelio
