= President of Bolivia =

Head of state and government

President of the Plurinational State of Bolivia
- Presidente Constitutional del Estado Plurinacional de Bolivia
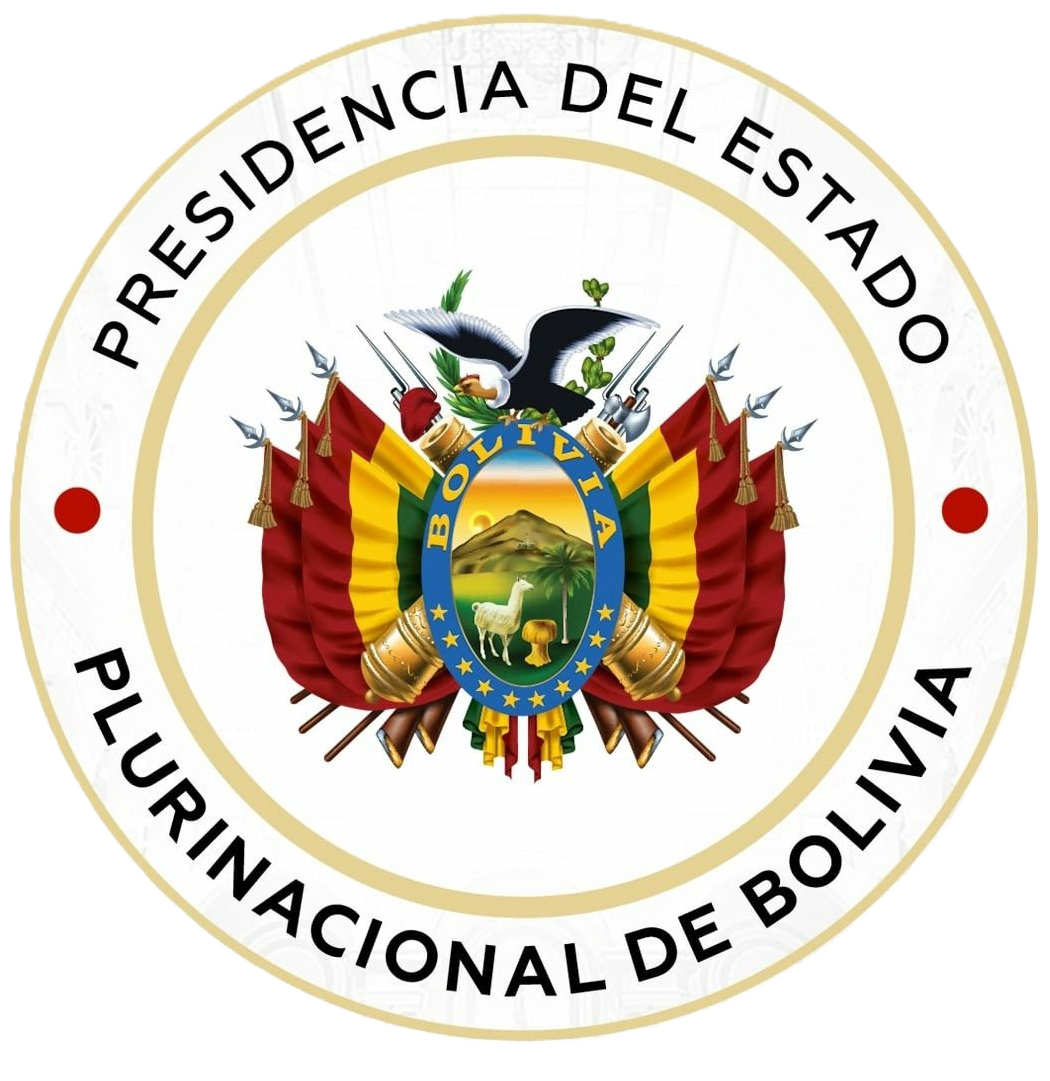
- Presidential seal since 2025

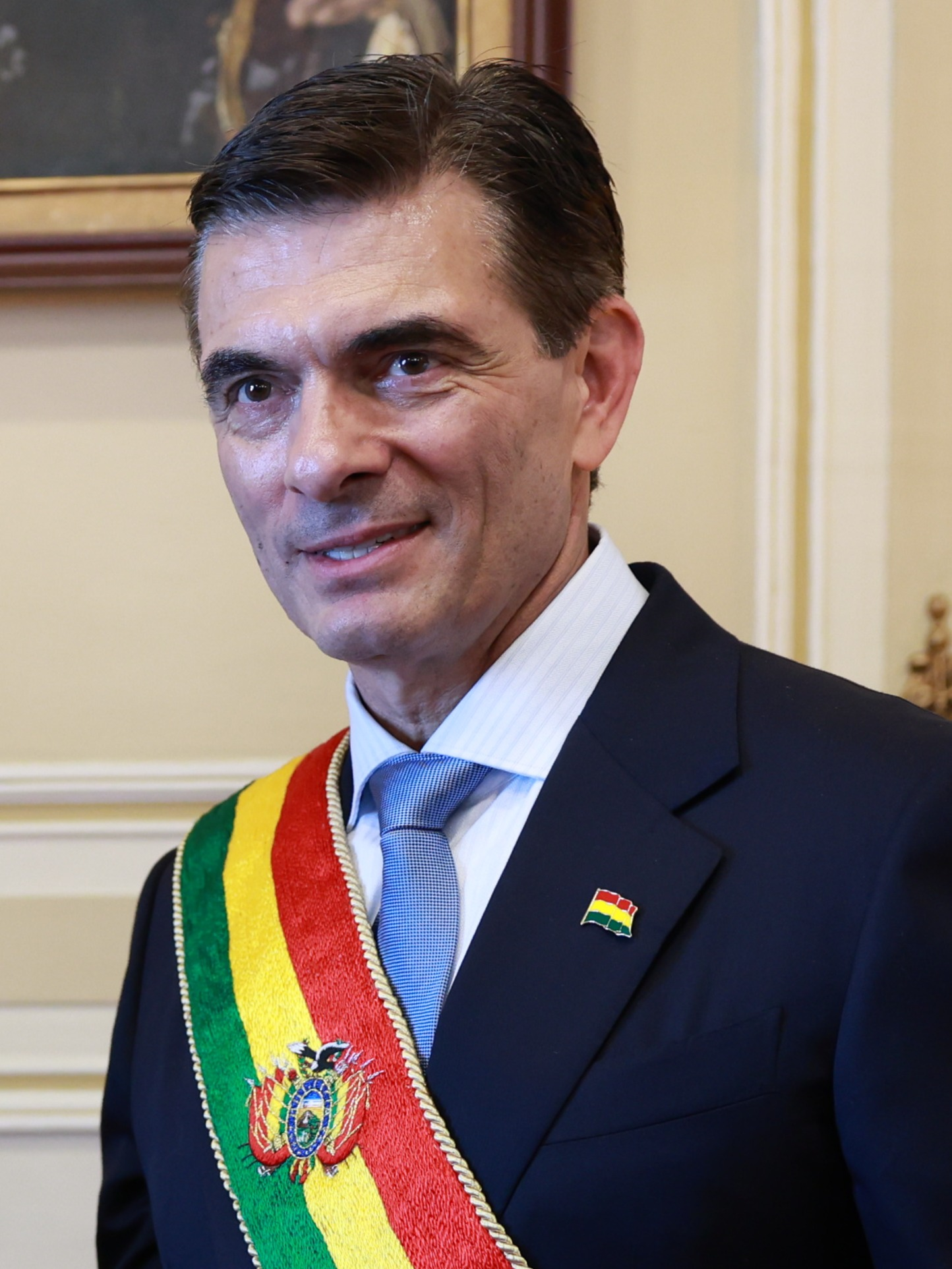
- Incumbent; Rodrigo Paz since 8 November 2025
- Style: Mr./Madam President (Señor/a Presidente/a) (informal); The Most Excellent (Excelentísimo/a Señor/a) (diplomatic)
- Status: Head of state Head of government
- Residence: Casa Grande del Pueblo
- Seat: La Paz
- Nominator: Plurinational Electoral Organ
- Appointer: Direct popular vote (two rounds if necessary)
- Term length: Five years, renewable once
- Constituting instrument: Constitution of Bolivia (2009)
- Inaugural holder: Simón Bolívar
- Formation: June 24, 1825 (201 years ago)
- First holder: José Mariano Serrano
- Deputy: Vice President of Bolivia
- Salary: Bs. 24,251 / US$3,561 monthly
- Website: www.presidencia.gob.bo

The president of Bolivia (Spanish: presidente/a de Bolivia), officially the constitutional president of the Plurinational State of Bolivia (Spanish: presidente/a constitutional del Estado Plurinacional de Bolivia), is the head of state and head of government of Bolivia. Under the Constitution of Bolivia, the president heads the executive branch of the national government and is captain general of the Armed Forces.

According to the Bolivian Constitution, the president is elected by popular vote to a five-year term and may serve a maximum of two terms. A strict and inviolable two-term limit is enshrined in the Bolivian Constitution. If no candidate wins a majority (defined as either more than 50%, or alternatively at least 40% and at least 10% more than the second-place candidate), the top two candidates advance to a runoff election.

Rodrigo Paz is the 68th and current president of Bolivia since 8 November 2025.

== Constitutional history ==
=== Establishment ===
On 6 August 1825, the Republic of Bolivia declared its independence and proclaimed Simón Bolívar head of state. While it is certainly true that Bolívar was the official ruler of the country starting from his arrival on 12 August, there exists conflict amongst scholars as to whether he should be considered the first president of the republic. According to the research of the Bolivian historian Isaac Sandoval, in his book "Political development in the social formation of Bolivia" it is affirmed that the first president of Bolivia was not Bolívar, but Antonio José de Sucre. This is due to the fact that Bolívar is never referred to as president in legal documents and was never sworn-in having renounced the title in favor of Sucre on 29 December 1825. Sucre, on the other hand, was president when the country's first Constitution was promulgated on 19 November 1826.

Historian and author of the book "Presidents of Bolivia: Between urns and rifles" Carlos Mesa asserts that Bolívar was indeed the first president and that the lack of mention of him with the title is due to the fact the term "president" was not in common use in legal documents at the time. Mesa points to the Congressional decree of 11 August 1825 which proclaims Bolívar "liberator" granting him "Supreme Executive Power of the Republic." Whatever the case, the position of Simón Bolívar as the first president is the most generally accepted stance.

The Bolivian Constitution of 1826, also known as the Bolivarian Constitution, was the first constitutional text prepared by Simón Bolívar, sanctioned by the General Constituent Congress on 6 November 1826 and promulgated by Antonio José de Sucre on 19 November 1826. In this first instance, the presidency constituted a lifetime position with the power to elect and appoint a successor. The lifetime position was repealed during the presidency of Andrés de Santa Cruz who promulgated the Political Constitution of 1831. Instead, the president would serve for a four-year term of government with the ability to be reelected unlimitedly.

=== 2009 Political Constitution ===
The 2009 Political Constitution, approved by referendum on 25 January 2009 and promulgated by President Evo Morales on 7 February resulted in the official name of the country, leaving behind its previous denominative of Republic of Bolivia to become the Plurinational State of Bolivia. As such, Evo Morales was the 65th and last President of the Republic and the first President of the State. The Constitution extended the term of the president from four years to five years while keeping the two-term limit. On 21 February 2016, a proposal to abolish term limits failed to pass via constitutional referendum by a margin of 51% to 49%. Despite this, on 28 November 2017, the Supreme Tribunal of Justice ruled that all elected officials could run for office indefinitely, rather than for the two consecutive terms permitted under the 2009 Constitution. The court justified its decision based on the American Convention on Human Rights' interpretation of political rights.

Prior to 2009, if no candidate won more than half of the popular vote, the president was chosen by a vote in a joint legislative session from among the top two candidates (prior to 1995, the top three). This system led to multiple times in which the loser of the popular vote, once even the third place finisher, were elected president. This was replaced by a two-round system in which if no party won more than half of the popular vote in the first electoral round, the top two contenders would run in a runoff election.

== Incumbency ==
=== Vacancies and succession ===
Of the 68 people who have served as President of Bolivia, 13 (19%) died by violent means, five died in office, and three died by assassination; Pedro Blanco Soto was shot while trying to escape custody, Agustín Morales was shot in self-defense after he attacked one of his military assistants, and Gualberto Villarroel was lynched outside the government palace. Germán Busch committed suicide and René Barrientos died in a helicopter crash; both deaths are rumored to have been planned assassinations. A further eight former presidents were assassinated in various ways after leaving office.

==== Line of succession ====
According to Article 169 I of the 2009 Constitution: "In the event of an impediment or definitive absence of the president, he or she shall be replaced by the vice president and, in the absence of the latter, by the president of the Senate, and in his or her absence by the president of the Chamber of Deputies. In this last case, new elections shall be called within a maximum period of 90 days.

Historically there have been multiple periods of time during different constitutions in which the office of vice president has been rendered nonexistent and more still in which the office was vacant. Between 26 October 1839 and 15 February 1878, the office of vice president was abolished with the president of the Senate being the first in the line of succession. During this time, Eusebio Guilarte and Tomás Frías Ametller both came to power in their capacity as President of the Council of State.

==== Interim president ====
Rather than complete the previous president's term, interim presidents have held office until new elections could be held even if that period of time runs past or cuts short the previous president's term. José María Pérez de Urdininea, Felipe Segundo Guzmán, Carlos Blanco Galindo, Carlos Quintanilla, Néstor Guillén, Tomás Monje, Wálter Guevara, Lidia Gueiler Tejada, Eduardo Rodríguez and most recently Jeanine Áñez all came to power as interim presidents due to the fact the previous president had resigned, been deposed, died, or otherwise left office and new elections had to be held to elect a valid successor.

José Miguel de Velasco Franco was initially the acting president in the absence of Andrés de Santa Cruz but became interim president due to the fact Santa Cruz never arrived to be sworn-in, forcing a new president to have to be elected by Congress.

==== Acting president ====
In the case of temporary incapacity or absence from the country, the title of Acting President (Spanish: Presidente en ejercicio) is transferred to lower officials according to the order of presidential succession. In September 2012, Senate president Gabriela Montaño became the first woman to assume this office, during the presidency of Evo Morales. José Miguel de Velasco Franco, Mariano Enrique Calvo, and Pedro José Domingo de Guerra were acting presidents for particularly long periods of time of multiple months or, in the case of Enrique Calvo, multiple years.

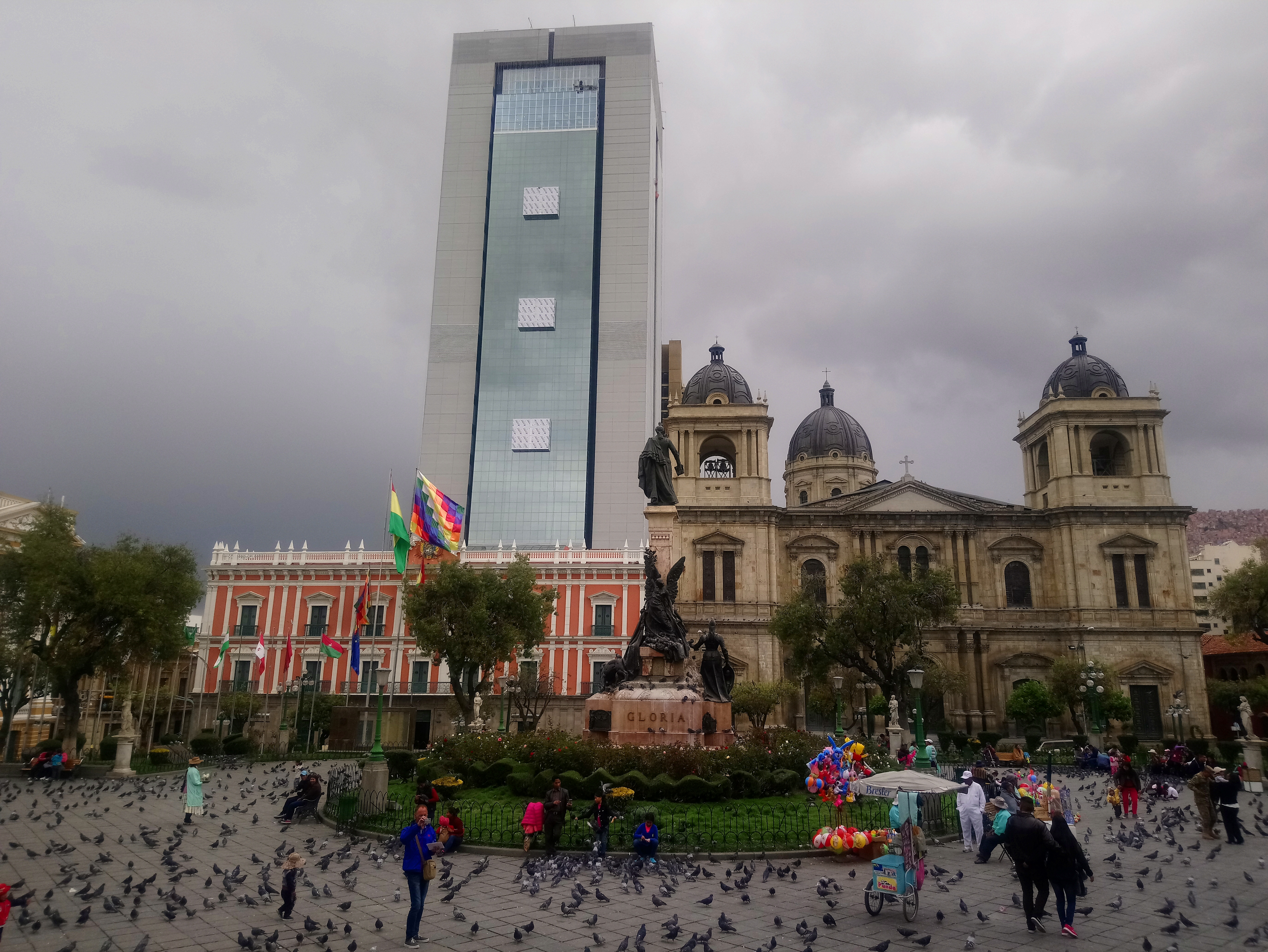
The Casa Grande del Pueblo is current residence of the president of Bolivia

=== Residence ===
The Palacio Quemado, in English "Burnt Palace," in the legal capital of La Paz was the official residence of the president of Bolivia from 1853 to 2018. Its nickname originates from the fact that it was set aflame and burned almost to the ground when rebels in opposition to Tomás Frías Ametller failed to storm it and instead opted to light it on fire in 1875. It has since been rebuilt and redecorated a number of times, but the name stuck. At the end of 2018, it ceased to function as the headquarters of the government offices, with plans to turn it instead into a museum. Briefly occupied again from 2019 to 2020, it has since returned to being a museum.

In 2018, the official residence of the president was moved by President Evo Morales to the Casa Grande del Pueblo, known in English as the "Great House of the People", replacing the Palacio Quemado as the seat of the Executive Branch of the Plurinational State of Bolivia. Inaugurated on 9 August 2018, the building houses the president as well as various government ministries. In 2019, Interim President Jeanine Áñez refused to use the new building and returned operations to the Palacio Quemado, though the ministries and other government offices continued to operate within the new building. The Casa Grande returned to being the residence of the president upon the inauguration of Luis Arce on 8 November 2020.

=== Travel ===
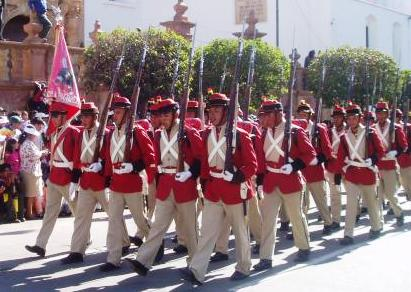
The Colorados of Bolivia in their traditional uniform.

The transportation of the president of Bolivia is the charge of the Bolivian Presidential Air Group, for the transportation of the president at the national short-range level the EC145 helicopter is used, for national and international transportation the Falcon 900EX EASY aircraft is used, both manufactured by Dassault Aviation (France) that make up part of the Bolivian Air Force's aircraft.

=== Protection ===
The Presidential Bodyguard is made up of the 1st Bolivian Colorados infantry regiment, which is a military unit of the Bolivian Army whose specific mission is to protect the security and physical integrity of the president of Bolivia and whose charge is the custody of the Palace of Government and the Casa Grande, as well as other properties of the presidency.

It has two infantry battalions, the BI-201 and BI-202, with their respective barracks, both located in the city of La Paz. The Calama headquarters is located on the street on the same name where the unit's headquarters and the regimental barracks and training depot operate and the Mirador barracks with a seat on the Quilli Quilli hill. The Villa Pavón area is a training center in various areas of specialization such as assault, support, protection of people, first aid, etc. There are also bedrooms in the Casa Grande del Pueblo for the soldiers who watch and stand guard at the government palace at night.

== Political history ==
Since its independence in 1825, Bolivia has been ruled by key figures in the fight for independence, leaders of the War of the Pacific, representatives of the aristocracy, military dictators and democratically elected leaders. Due to the complexities in the rise to power of these individuals, in Bolivia presidents are divided between two groups. The first are what are classified as "Constitucionales" having come to power legally or through quasi-legal means (achieving power through a revolution or coup d'état but later constitutionalised). The rest are known as de facto presidents, having come to power militarily and never constitutionalised. A third category belongs to interim presidents, placed in power only until a new president is chosen. Interim presidents have historically been both constitutional or de facto depending on the legality of their rise to the office.

Throughout Bolivian history, there have been six periods of time in 1839, 1841, 1848, 1879–1880, and most recently in 2019 in which there has been no head of state. Seven governments were made up of triumvirates: 1861, 1899, 1920–1921, 1970, 1978, 1981, and 1982. For one month in 1928, Hernando Siles Reyes' cabinet ruled the country being the only time when a constituted government was not presided over by an agent. In 1965, faced with discontent from loyalists of Alfredo Ovando Candía, President René Barrientos established the co-presidency between himself and Ovando on 26 May 1965. This is the only example of two presidents ruling at once in Bolivian history and it lasted until 2 January 1966 when Barrientos resigned to run for president in the upcoming general elections.

In 1983, a poll was taken by Última Hora newspaper to determine which seven historical presidents were regarded as most significant. The "winners" were Antonio José de Sucre, Andrés de Santa Cruz, Manuel Isidoro Belzu, Mariano Melgarejo, Aniceto Arce, Ismael Montes, and Víctor Paz Estenssoro.

Sucre oversaw the early developments of the country with the promulgation of the Political Constitution of 1826. Andrés de Santa Cruz oversaw the unification of Bolivia with Peru to become the Peru-Bolivian Confederation in 1836. His term as Supreme Protector of the Peru–Bolivian Confederation saw the height of the political power of Bolivia on the South American continent though it would ultimately end in failure and the separation of the two states. Manuel Isidoro Belzu was perhaps amongst the most populist Bolivian presidents, attempting to modernize the country through division of wealth. The dictatorship of Mariano Melgarejo saw brutal repression of opposition and Bolivia's indigenous population. Following the War of the Pacific, Aniceto Arce and Ismael Montes would respectivaley become influential leaders in the Conservative and Liberal eras. Víctor Paz Estenssoro led the 1952 National Revolution and founded the Revolutionary Nationalist Movement (MNR) which heavily influenced Bolivian politics in the second half of the 20th century.

=== Indigenous presidents ===
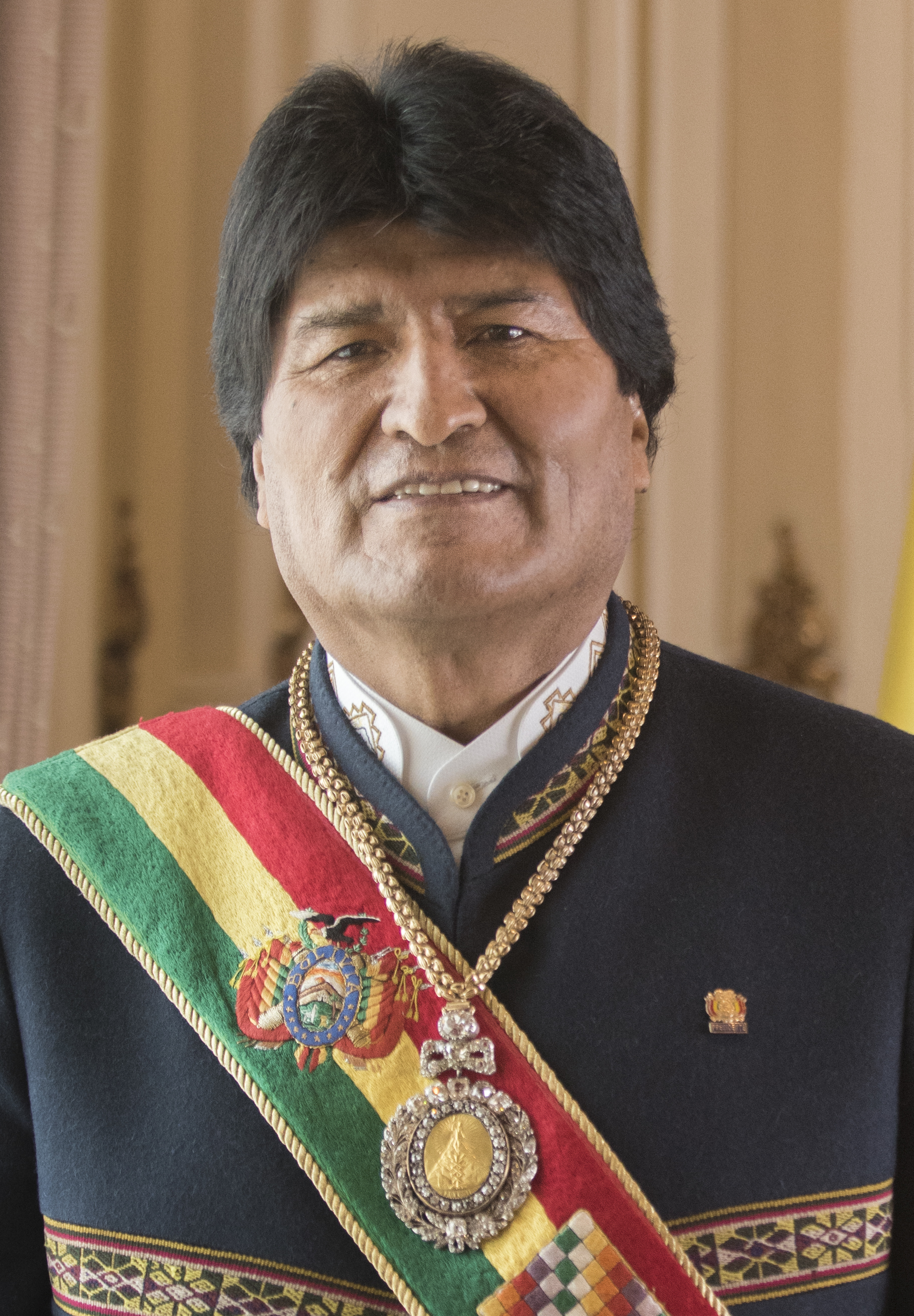
Evo Morales, Bolivia's first indigenous president.

Evo Morales is described as the first indigenous president of Bolivia in academic studies of his presidency, such as those of Muñoz-Pogossian, Webber, Philip and Panizza, and Farthing and Kohl, as well as in press reports, such as those of BBC News. However, there have been challenges to this claim by critics who have asserted that Morales probably has some European ancestry, and thus on genetic grounds is technically mestizo rather than solely indigenous. Further, former president Enrique Peñaranda was of substantially indigenous origin while Andrés de Santa Cruz, was of Aymara and Inca lineage. Harten asserted that this argument was "misguided[,] wrong[... and] above all irrelevant" because regardless of his genetic makeup, the majority of Bolivians perceive Morales as being the first indigenous president. In Bolivian society, indigeneity is a fluid concept rooted in cultural identity; for instance, many indigenous individuals that have settled in urban areas and abandoned their traditional rural customs have come to identify as mestizo.

=== Women presidents ===
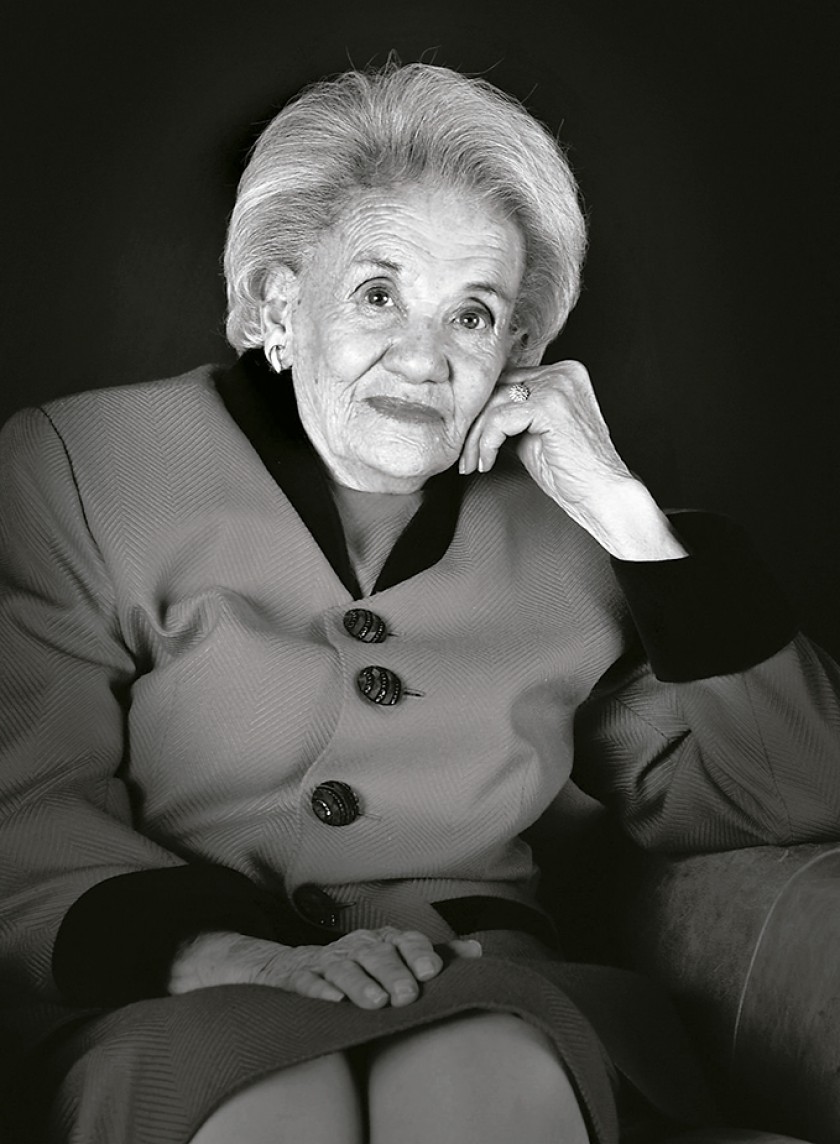
Lidia Gueiler Tejada was Bolivia's first female president.

Two women have served as presidents of the country. Lidia Gueiler Tejada became the first female president of Bolivia (second in the history of the Americas) on 16 November 1979 following a brief coup by Alberto Natusch. Jeanine Añez was the second and most recent female president from 12 November 2019 to 8 November 2020. Both women came to power in similar ways, taking office on an interim basis as members of Congress. As of yet, however, no woman has been elected president by popular vote in Bolivian history.

== See also ==
- List of presidents of Bolivia
- History of Bolivia
- Politics of Bolivia
