= José Manuel del Carpio =

Bolivian vice president from 1888-1892

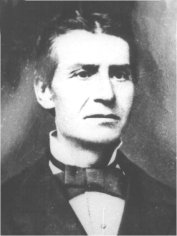

8th Vice President of Bolivia
- First Vice President
- In office 15 August 1888 – 11 August 1892 Serving with Serapio Reyes Ortiz
- President: Aniceto Arce
- Preceded by: Mariano Baptista
- Succeeded by: Severo Fernández

Foreign Minister of Bolivia
- In office 4 December 1891 – 15 August 1892
- President: Aniceto Arce
- Preceded by: Serapio Reyes Ortiz
- Succeeded by: Severo Fernández
- In office 17 August 1877 – 7 May 1878
- President: Hilarión Daza
- Preceded by: Jorge Oblitas
- Succeeded by: Luciano Valle

Personal details
- Born: 19 March 1818 Sucre, Bolivia
- Died: 14 February 1896 (aged 77) Sucre, Bolivia
- Party: Conservative
- Spouse: Genuaria López Videla Rivera
- Parent(s): José María del Carpio Becerra; María Josefa Cardozo Rivera

José Manuel del Carpio Cardozo (19 March 1818 - 14 February 1896) was a Bolivian politician who served as the eighth vice president of Bolivia from 1888 to 1892. A member of the Conservative Party, he served as first vice president alongside second vice president Serapio Reyes Ortiz during the administration of Aniceto Arce.

He was Minister of Public Instruction, Justice and Worship, Government and Foreign Relations in the government of Hilarión Daza. Acting Minister of War during the presidency of Gregorio Pacheco. During the presidency of Aniceto Arce, he also held the position of Minister of Foreign Affairs and Worship.

Political offices
Preceded by Jorge Oblitas	Foreign Minister of Bolivia; 1877–1878	Succeeded by Luciano Valle
Preceded by Mariano Baptista	Vice President of Bolivia; First Vice President; 1888–1892; Served alongside: Serapio Reyes Ortiz	Succeeded by Severo Fernández
Preceded by Serapio Reyes Ortiz	Foreign Minister of Bolivia; 1891–1892	Succeeded by Severo Fernández
