= Daniel Núñez del Prado =

Bolivian medical doctor (1840-1891)

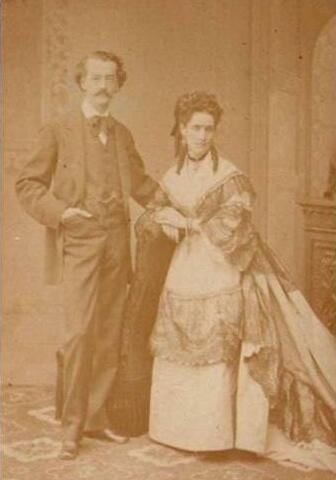
- Núñez del Prado in 1865

Foreign Minister of Bolivia
- In office 1881
- President: Narciso Campero
- Preceded by: Belisario Boeto
- Succeeded by: Pedro José Zilveti

Personal details
- Born: 29 July 1840 La Paz, Bolivia
- Died: 1891 (aged 50–51)
- Education: National University of San Marcos
- Occupation: Medical doctor
- Military career
- Allegiance: Bolivia
- Rank: Commander
- Wars: Chincha Islands War; War of the Pacific

Daniel Núñez del Prado (29 July 1840 – 1891) was a Bolivian medical doctor, educator and civil servant. He served as foreign minister under President Narciso Campero in 1881.

== Biography ==
Núñez del Prado was born in La Paz to José María Núñez del Prado and Isabel del Valle and had a brother, Eduardo, who was also a doctor of medicine. He finished his medical degree at the National University of San Marcos in 1863 with a dissertation entitled Infartos del cuello uterino (lit. 'Cervical infarctions').

He opted to remain in Peru rather than return to Bolivia following Mariano Melgarejo's coup in 1864, though it is possible he was expelled by Melgarejo. He fought against Spanish invaders in 1866 under Commander José Gálvez, earning him decorations from the Peruvian and Bolivian governments. He returned to Peru in the late 1860s and worked to stem the yellow fever epidemic there. He was later awarded a gold medal by the Municipality of Lima for his work. Núñez del Prado provided medical treatment to Melgarejo twice in 1871: first following a suicide attempt in October, and again after being shot twice in the neck in November. Melgarejo died from the gunshot wounds.

Núñez del Prado returned to Bolivia after Agustín Morales seized power in 1871. He was president of La Paz's City Council in 1879 and spoke out against President Hilarión Daza. That December, when forces led by Uladislao Silva overthrew Daza, Núñez del Prado was made prefect of Lima. He served as Foreign Minister of Bolivia in 1881 under Narciso Campero. He was then part of the Victoria Battalion during the Pacific War, fighting at the Battle of Pisagua. He was given the title of Colonel of his troop in 1882.

Núñez del Prado worked at Hospital Landaeta as a doctor and as a professor in and dean of the medical school at University of La Paz. He helped develop curriculum to train doctors, collaborating with professionals including Enrique Hertzog. He also established La Paz's fire department and commanded its first company in 1886.

== Publications ==
- 1870: Fiebre amarilla: su origen, causas, sintomas, tratamiento, etc. Lima: Imprenta Liberal (in Spanish).
- 1884: Tactica de Infantería. La Paz (in Spanish).
