= Serapio Reyes Ortiz =

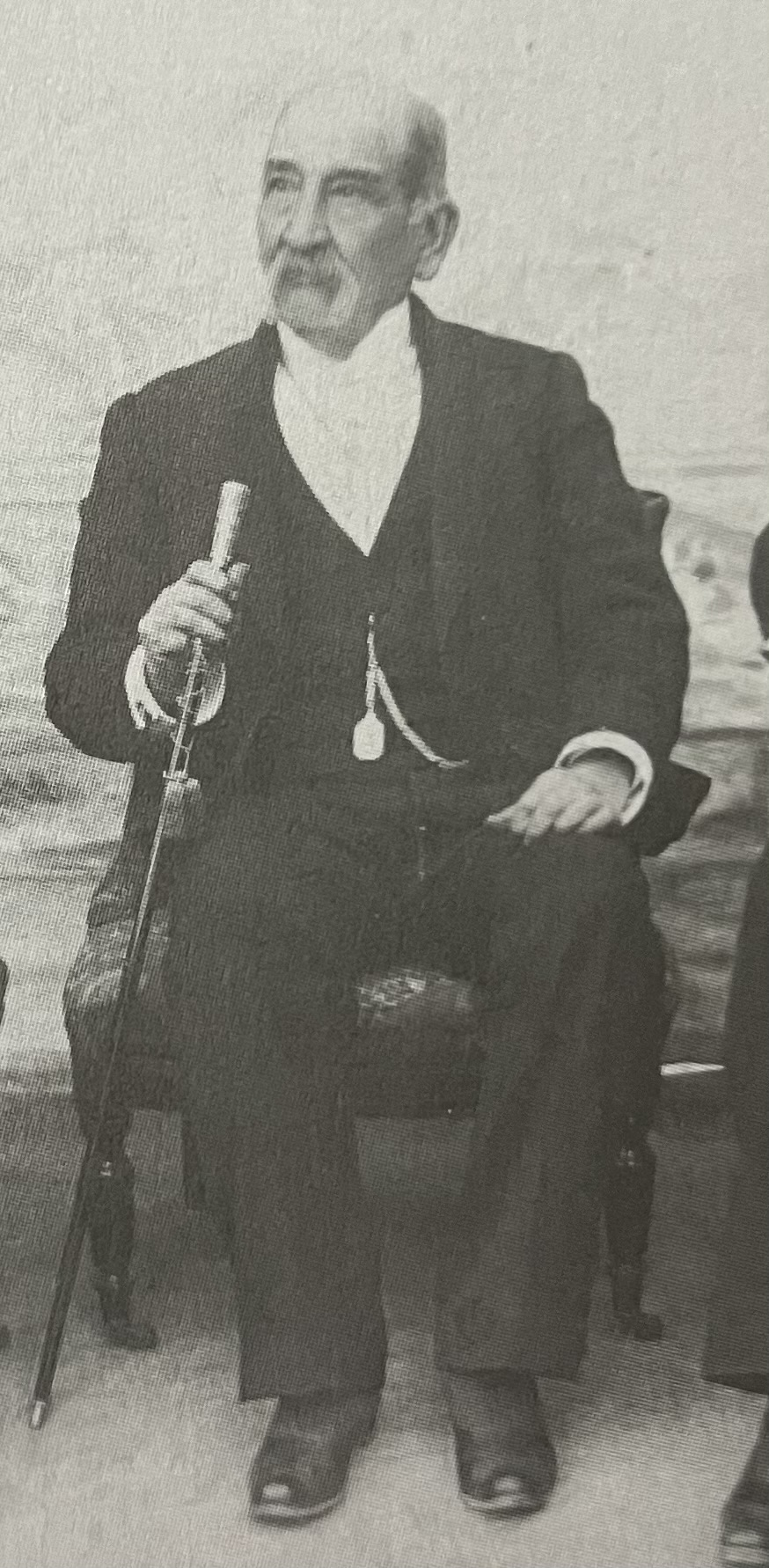

President of Bolivia
- Acting
- In office 11 September 1879 – 28 December 1879
- Preceded by: Pedro José de Guerra (Note: When Pedro José de Guerra died on 10 September, Serapio Reyes Ortiz assumed the presidency of the council of ministers which was ruling the country in the absence of Hilarión Daza. As such, Reyes Ortiz assumed the role of acting president of the Republic on 11 September.)
- Succeeded by: Uladislao Silva (President of the Junta); Narciso Campero (provisional)

9th Vice President of Bolivia
- Second Vice President
- In office 15 August 1888 – 11 August 1892 Serving with José Manuel del Carpio
- President: Aniceto Arce
- Preceded by: Jorge Oblitas
- Succeeded by: Jenaro Sanjinés

Foreign Minister of Bolivia
- In office 26 January 1891 – 4 December 1891
- President: Aniceto Arce
- Preceded by: Mariano Baptista
- Succeeded by: José Manuel del Carpio
- In office 7 February 1879 – 27 December 1879
- President: Hilarión Daza
- Preceded by: Martín Lanza Saravia
- Succeeded by: Juan Crisóstomo Carrillo

Personal details
- Born: 14 November 1822 Coroico, Viceroyalty of the Río de la Plata
- Died: 6 September 1900 (aged 77) La Paz, Bolivia
- Party: Conservative
- Spouse: Lorenza Pastora de Urioste Gómez
- Children: Carmen Reyes Ortiz; Serapio Reyes Ortiz

Serapio Reyes Ortiz (14 November 1822 – 6 November 1900) was a Bolivian lawyer, professor, and politician who served as acting President of Bolivia in 1879, after the death of Pedro José de Guerra and the continued absence of Hilarión Daza, and as the ninth Vice president of Bolivia from 1888 to 1892. A member of the Conservative Party, he served as second vice president alongside first vice president José Manuel del Carpio during the administration of Aniceto Arce.

== Early life and career ==
=== Studies ===
Reyes Ortiz was born in Coroico on 14 November 1822. He completed his early studies at the Seminary College of La Paz in 1835. In 1843, he received the title of Doctor of Law. Following this, he went directly to occupy the position of Minister of the College of Sciences of La Paz, and then professor of literature in Oruro. In 1844, he concluded his literary career, Ortiz began to practice the art of letters, sometimes producing epithets, such as a literary act alluding to the Battle of Ingavi and its hero Ballivián.

=== Political career ===
Reyes Ortiz served as a minister during the government of José María de Achá.

Reyes Ortiz was captain of the Academic Company of the National Guard of La Paz in 1861, rising to the rank of lieutenant colonel, and as of 7 May 1862, he served as First Chief of the Civic Column.

In the years of consolidation of the country's republican institutions, he served as Minister of Public Instruction and Worship between 1862 and 1863 in the administration of José María de Achá. Furthermore, he was Minister of Government, Worship, and Foreign Affairs in 1864. Earlier that same year, he was appointed Prefect of the Department of La Paz. When Manuel Isidoro Belzu's supporters and Mariano Melgarejo ousted Achá in December 1864, Reyes Ortiz went into exile.

After being exiled and working as a lawyer on the coast of Peru, he returned to Bolivia in 1871 when Melgarejo was ousted by a massive revolution headed by Commander of the Army Agustín Morales. The year of his return, Reyes Ortiz was appointed Minister of the Chamber of the Court of Justice of La Paz. From 1872 to 1874, he practiced law in the town of Caracoles, after which he was elected Deputy and later served as President of Congress. The same National Congress appointed him President of the Council of State.

== Acting President of Bolivia ==
=== Tensions with Chile ===
Map of the disputed area between Bolivian and Chile.

Reyes Ortiz participated in the decision of legislators to apply the Law of 14 February 1878, which entailed the collection of ten cents per exportable quintal of nitrate from the Compañía de Salitres y Ferrocarril de Antofagasta.

This measure brought a series of protests by the government and the Chilean company. The Compañía de Salitres y Ferrocarril de Antofagasta protested against this tax, refused to pay, and requested the protection of the Chilean Government. As a result of diplomatic negotiations with Chile, on 8 November 1878, the tax was suspended by the Bolivian government.

On 17 December of that year, President Hilarión Daza instructed Reyes Ortiz to instruct the Prefect of Cobija, through the Chancellery of the Republic, to notify the manager of the Compañía de Salitres y Ferrocarril de Antofagasta about the enforcement of the tax. Chilean diplomats in La Paz flatly denied accepting such a payment. Daza then ordered the seizure of the company's assets, violating the treaty of 1873 which stipulated no tax could be levied on Chilean companies or individuals for twenty-five years.

=== Mission to Lima and Daza's departure ===
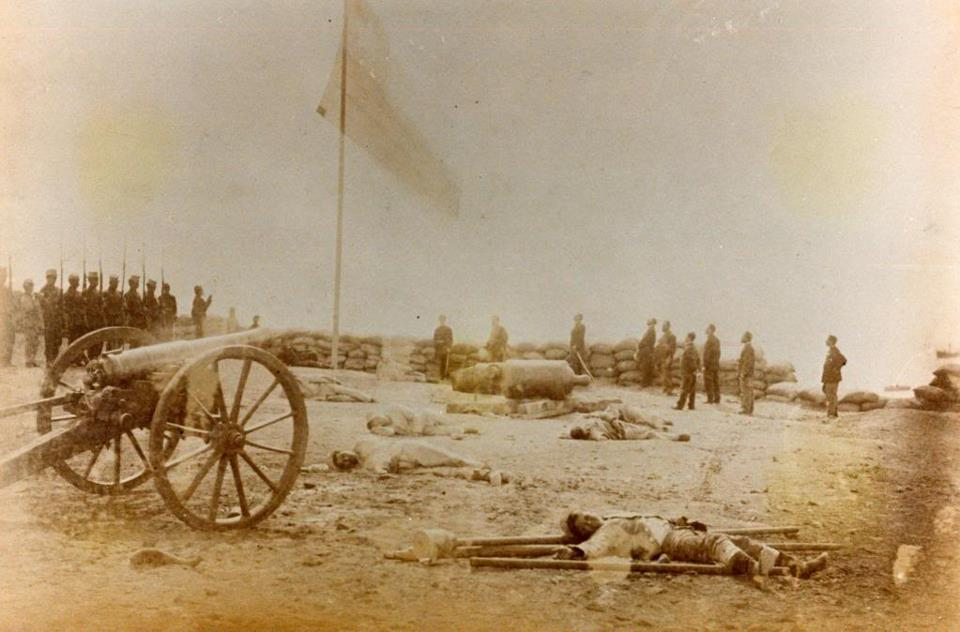
A scene from the War of the Pacific.

Daza would appoint Reyes Ortiz to the Ministry of Justice, Instruction and Worship, and was, later, as Minister of Foreign Affairs in 1879. On 9 February, Daza sent Reyes Ortiz on a special mission to Lima to make the Secret Alliance of 1873 with Peru effective.

Reyes Ortiz arrived in Lima on 16 February. For his part, the Chilean Minister in Lima, Joaquín Godoy, went to confer again with President Mariano Ignacio Prado and to learn the reasons for the mission of the Bolivian Envoy Extraordinary. In that interview, memorable for Chile's relations with Peru and Bolivia, Prado revealed to him the existence of the Peruvian-Bolivian Treaty of Alliance of 1873. However, Peru wanted to mediate in the conflict instead of joining the war, and sent Special Mission headed Don José Antonio Lavalle to solve the crisis.

On 18 February, in Chichilaya, on the shores of Lake Titicaca, Reyes Ortiz received a legalized copy of the Chilean ultimatum. In Puno, he took a train to Moliendo, hurrying to deliver the news to the government. Eventually, Bolivia declared war on Chile and Peru, honoring the secret treaty signed in 1873, joined the infamous War of the Pacific.

In April of that year, Daza decided to command the Bolivian Army himself, leaving the executive power to a Council of Ministers headed by Pedro José de Guerra. Reyes Ortiz was a member of the Council and would later assume the Presidency of said body after the sudden death of Guerra in September of that same year. As such, he would be Acting President of Bolivia until Daza's overthrow by Uladislao Silva on 28 December 1879.

== Vice president of Bolivia ==
=== Second Vice president ===
He held the Second Vice Presidency of the Republic between 1888 and 1892 during the presidency of Aniceto Arce. He also served as Minister of Foreign Affairs in 1891. In 1893, Reyes Ortiz was appointed president of the Extraordinary Commission sent to the city of Puno to transfer the ashes of General José Ballivián to Bolivia.

=== The Junta and death ===
In 1896, the government of Severo Fernández Alonso entrusted him with the position of Prefect of La Paz. Although Reyes Ortiz was a member of the Conservative Party, when the Federal Revolution of 1899 triumphed, he was appointed to the Government Junta alongside José Manuel Pando and Macario Pinilla. The junta finally determined La Paz to be the capital of Bolivia. On 24 October 1899, a vote carried out determined that Pando was to be sole President and the junta was dissolved. Reyes Ortiz died less than a year after the dissolution of the junta on 6 September 1900, aged 77.
