= Mariano Baptista Gumucio =

Bolivian politician and writer (1933–2026)

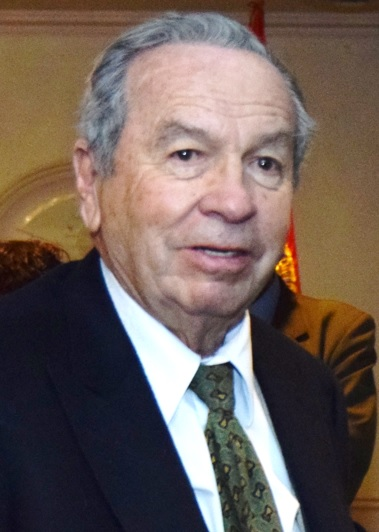

Minister of Education of Bolivia
- In office 1969–1970
- President: Alfredo Ovando
- In office 1979
- President: Wálter Guevara
- In office 1989–1990
- President: Jaime Paz Zamora

Personal details
- Born: 11 December 1933 Cochabamba, Bolivia
- Died: 21 April 2026 (aged 92) La Paz, Bolivia
- Relatives: Mariano Baptista (grandfather)
- Education: Higher University of San Andrés; University of San Francisco Xavier
- Occupation: Writer

Mariano Baptista Gumucio (11 December 1933 – 21 April 2026) was a Bolivian politician and writer. A member of the Academia Boliviana de la Lengua, he served as minister of education of Bolivia from 1969 to 1970, in 1979 and from 1989 to 1990.

Baptista Gumucio died in La Paz on 21 April 2026, at the age of 92.
