= Carlos Iturralde Ballivián =

Bolivian diplomat, politician, and businessman (1941–2021)

Foreign Minister of Bolivia
- In office 1989–1992
- President: Jaime Paz Zamora
- Preceded by: Valentín Abecia Baldivieso
- Succeeded by: Ronald MacLean Abaroa

Personal details
- Born: 25 April 1941 La Paz, Bolivia
- Died: 16 August 2021 (aged 80)
- Party: Nationalist Democratic Action

Carlos Iturralde Ballivián (25 April 1941 – 16 August 2021) was a Bolivian diplomat, politician, and businessman. He served as the Foreign Minister of Bolivia from 1989 to 1992. Iturralde was a longtime member of the Nationalist Democratic Action party (ADN). In addition to the foreign ministry, Iturralde also served as Minister of Industry and Commerce and ambassador to Australia, Indonesia, Malaysia, Thailand, and the United States during his career.

Outside of politics, Iturralde served as the president of the Confederación de Empresarios Privados de Bolivia from 1986 to 1989. He also chaired the board of trustees of the Universidad Privada Boliviana (UPM). Iturralde was president of the advisory and executive committees for the Red de Soluciones para el Desarrollo Sostenible-Bolivia (SDSN Bolivia), a business organization, at the time of his death in 2021.

Carlos Iturralde Ballivián died on 16 August 2021, at the age of 80.
