= Aniceto Arce =

22nd President of Bolivia (1824–1906)

22nd President of Bolivia
- In office 15 August 1888 – 11 August 1892
- Vice President: José Manuel del Carpio; Serapio Reyes Ortiz
- Preceded by: Gregorio Pacheco
- Succeeded by: Mariano Baptista

4th Vice President of Bolivia
- First Vice President
- In office 31 May 1880 – 11 March 1881 Serving with Belisario Salinas
- President: Narciso Campero
- Preceded by: Mariano Enrique Calvo
- Succeeded by: Mariano Baptista

Minister of Finance
- In office 18 October 1862 – 22 December 1862
- President: José María de Achá
- Preceded by: Rudecindo Carvajal
- Succeeded by: Melchor Urquidi

Personal details
- Born: Aniceto Arce Ruiz de Mendoza; 15 April 1824 Padcaya, United Provinces of the Río de la Plata (now Bolivia)
- Died: 14 August 1906 (aged 82) Sucre, Bolivia
- Party: Conservative; Constitutional Party
- Other political affiliations: Liberal Party
- Spouse: Amalia Argandoña Revilla
- Parent(s): Diego Antonio Arce; Josefa Ruiz de Mendoza
- Education: University of Saint Francis Xavier

Aniceto Arce Ruiz de Mendoza (15 April 1824 – 14 August 1906) was a Bolivian businessman and politician who served as the 22nd president of Bolivia from 1888 to 1892. He also served as the fourth vice president under Narciso Campero from 1880 to 1881.

Through his stakes in the Huanchaca Mining Company, Arce became Bolivia's wealthiest individual. He came to own a vast cattle ranch in the southeastern lowlands, an indigenous Ava Guaraní territory forcefully incorporated during the second half of the 19th century. The Aniceto Arce Province is named after him.

== Early life ==
Aniceto Arce was born on 15 April 1824 to Diego Antonio Arce and Josefa Ruiz de Mendoza, both members of the colonial elite within the Viceroyalty of the Río de la Plata. He was born in Tarija but resided for most of his life in Sucre, where he was educated as a lawyer and became one of the nation's foremost silver mining tycoons. Much of his wealth stemmed from his 1850 investment in Mariano Ramírez's Huanchaca Mining Company.

=== Political life ===
Arce was a supporter of José María Linares and his Constitutionalist government, backing the president when he proclaimed himself dictator. During the Linares regime, Arce entered Congress, remaining in office until the 1870s, when Hilarión Daza seized power.

Arce had extensive business connections in Chile, where he sold much of his silver, invested profits, and sought financing for projects. He was a leading voice for peace between Bolivia and Chile during the War of the Pacific. He believed that the Litoral was largely indefensible, and therefore, that Bolivia should have sought an alliance with Chile rather than Peru.

Arce called for the establishment of a conservative democratic order, with the primacy of law, regular elections, and rule by enlightened pro-business elites such as himself. To this end, he founded the Conservative Party, and was a candidate in the 1880 congressional election for president. He had a role in drafting the country's new constitution. He agreed to become Narciso Campero's vice president for the for the 1880 to 1884 term.

== Personal life ==
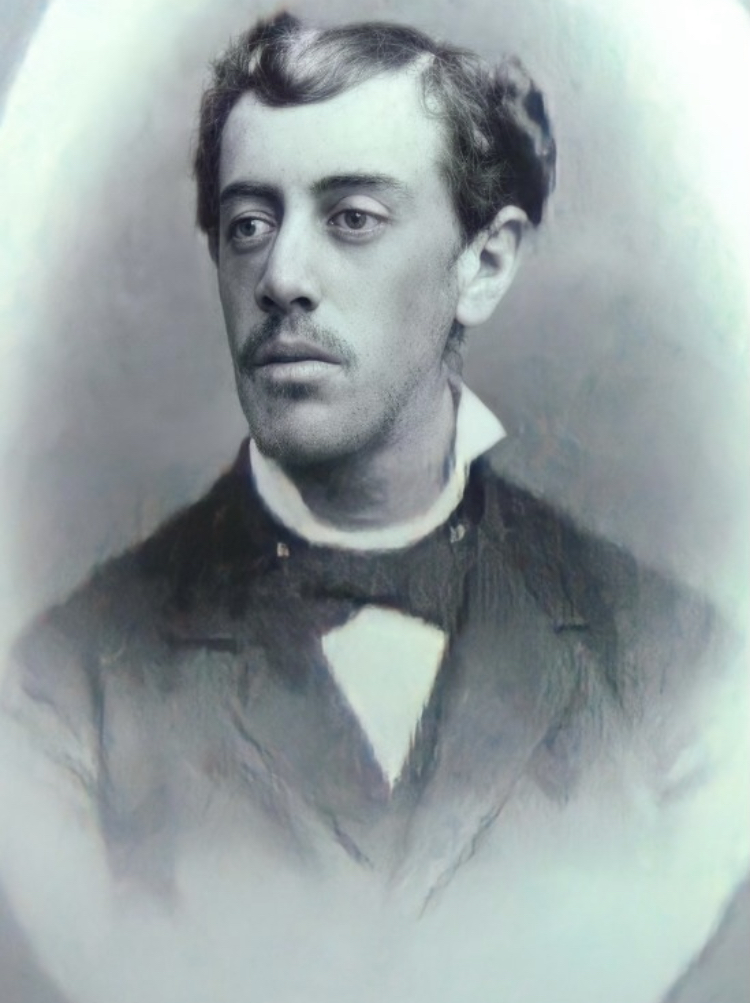
The young and radical Liberal partisan, Atanasio de Urioste Velasco, who would save Arce's life.

Arce married to Amalia Argandoña Revilla, the sister of Francisco Argandoña Revilla, prince of La Glorieta. He was one of the wealthiest men in Bolivia and became a business partner of Arce. Arce encouraged Argandoña's marriage to Clotilde de Urioste Velasco, a member of a powerful family from Sucre and sister of one of Arce's staunchest detractors, Atanasio de Urioste Velasco. Despite their animosity, Urioste saved the life of Arce when a mob surrounded the Cathedral of Sucre with the intention to lynch him. Urioste disguised Arce as a priest and took him into his own home.

== Vice President of Bolivia ==
=== Pro-Chile stance and exile ===
Arce's pro-Chile stance clashed with those of the Campero, who favored rearmament and a sustained diplomatic offensive against Chile, perhaps leading to a mediation of the conflict and if not, to a reinsertions of Bolivian troops in Peru's aid. Arce favored a "realistic" policy of recognition that Bolivia had lost its access to the Pacific, and that the best that could be done was to reach a modus vivendi with Santiago, even if this meant abandoning the alliance with Lima. Campero took this as a sign of treason and, in 1881, expelled Arce from Bolivia.

=== Return and the elections of 1884 ===
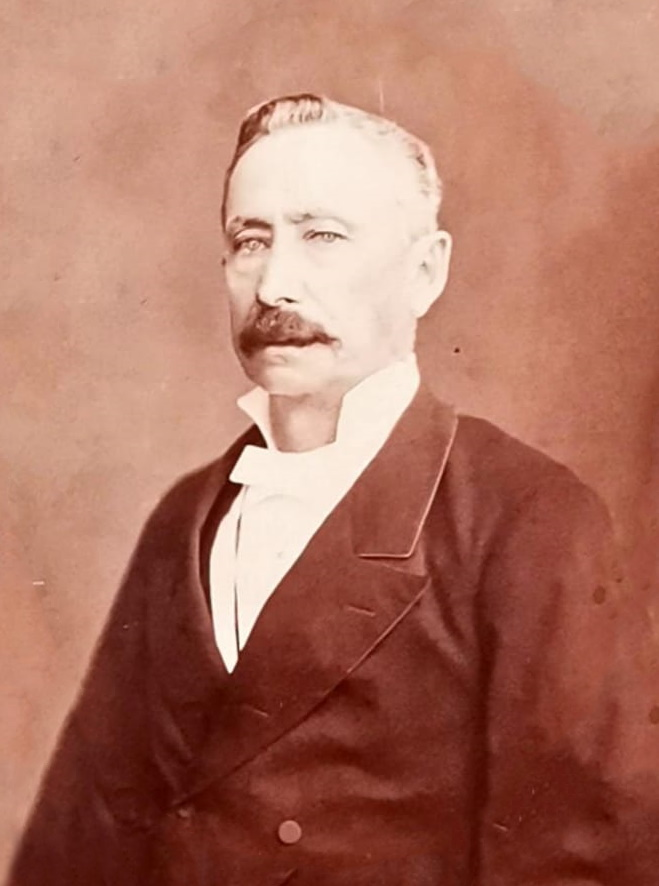
Gregorio Pacheco would defeat Arce during the 1884 general elections.

Eventually, Arce's name was cleared and he was allowed to return to the country. He promptly entered as the Conservative Party candidate in the 1884 presidential election, the first under the new constitution and since 1873. Arce was widely expected to win, but very narrowly lost to the "dark-horse" candidate Gregorio Pacheco, a man even wealthier than Arce and the country's chief philanthropist, who ran on a platform of apolitical "efficient administration." Being privileged silver miners from the south who shared a conservative, pro-business philosophy, the two reached an understanding, with Pacheco agreeing to become president in exchange for pledging himself to support the Conservative candidate in the 1884 elections.

== President of Bolivia ==
=== Administration ===
As had been agreed upon, Pacheco supported Arce in the 1888 elections. Arce became president in August 1888, at the age of 64. Arce ruled repressively. He initiated construction of the first intra-Bolivian railway (leading from the Chilean border to Oruro), giving Bolivia access to the sea by rail. He was behind the electrification of a number of Bolivian cities. He also promulgated a modern new set of banking and investment laws.

Unabashedly pro-capitalist, devoted to practically unrestricted free entrepreneurship, and pro-insertion into the international economy through foreign investment, he faced many pro-Liberal rebellions but managed to hold on to power by force. He completed his term and in 1892 and was succeeded by his vice president, Mariano Baptista.

== Later life and death ==
=== Retirement and the elections of 1904 ===
Arce retired from politics after the end of his term, although he served as an unofficial but very important adviser to the Conservative presidents Baptista (1892–1896) and Severo Fernández (1896–99). He suffered political prosecution by the Liberal Party, which seized power in the Civil War of 1899.

Arce was nonetheless allowed to present himself as candidate for president at the 1904 general elections, due to his perceived beatability. Arce ran against the officially supported, popular Liberal candidate Ismael Montes. He lost by a wide margin—the largest in Bolivian electoral history up to that point.

=== Death ===
Arce then retired from politics, withdrawing to his vast rural estate, where he died two years later in 1906, at the age of 82. He is remembered for his assertive temperament and firm stance in favor of a civilian democratic (although oligarchic) order and for having laid the foundation for the functioning of a modern party system in the country.

== Political views ==
Arce advocated for capitalism and was a supporter of Linaresism

Political offices
Preceded by Rudecindo Carvajal	Minister of Finance; 1862	Succeeded by Melchor Urquidi
Vacant Title last held by Mariano Enrique Calvo	Vice President of Bolivia; First Vice President; 1880–1881; Served alongside: Belisario Salinas	Vacant Title next held by Mariano Baptista
Preceded by Gregorio Pacheco	President of Bolivia; 1888–1892	Succeeded by Mariano Baptista
Party political offices
Preceded by New political party	Constitutional nominee for President of Bolivia; 1884	Succeeded by Party dissolved
Preceded by New political party	Conservative nominee for President of Bolivia; 1888	Succeeded by Mariano Baptista
