= Partido Conservador =

Partido Conservador may refer to:

- Colombian Conservative Party
- Conservative Party (Bolivia)
- Conservative Party (Brazil)
- Conservative Party (Chile)
- Conservative Party (Ecuador)
- Conservative Party of Nicaragua
- Conservative Party (Panama)
- Conservative Party (Spain)
