= Pedro José de Guerra =

Bolivian jurist and acting President of Bolivia

Pedro José Domingo de Guerra
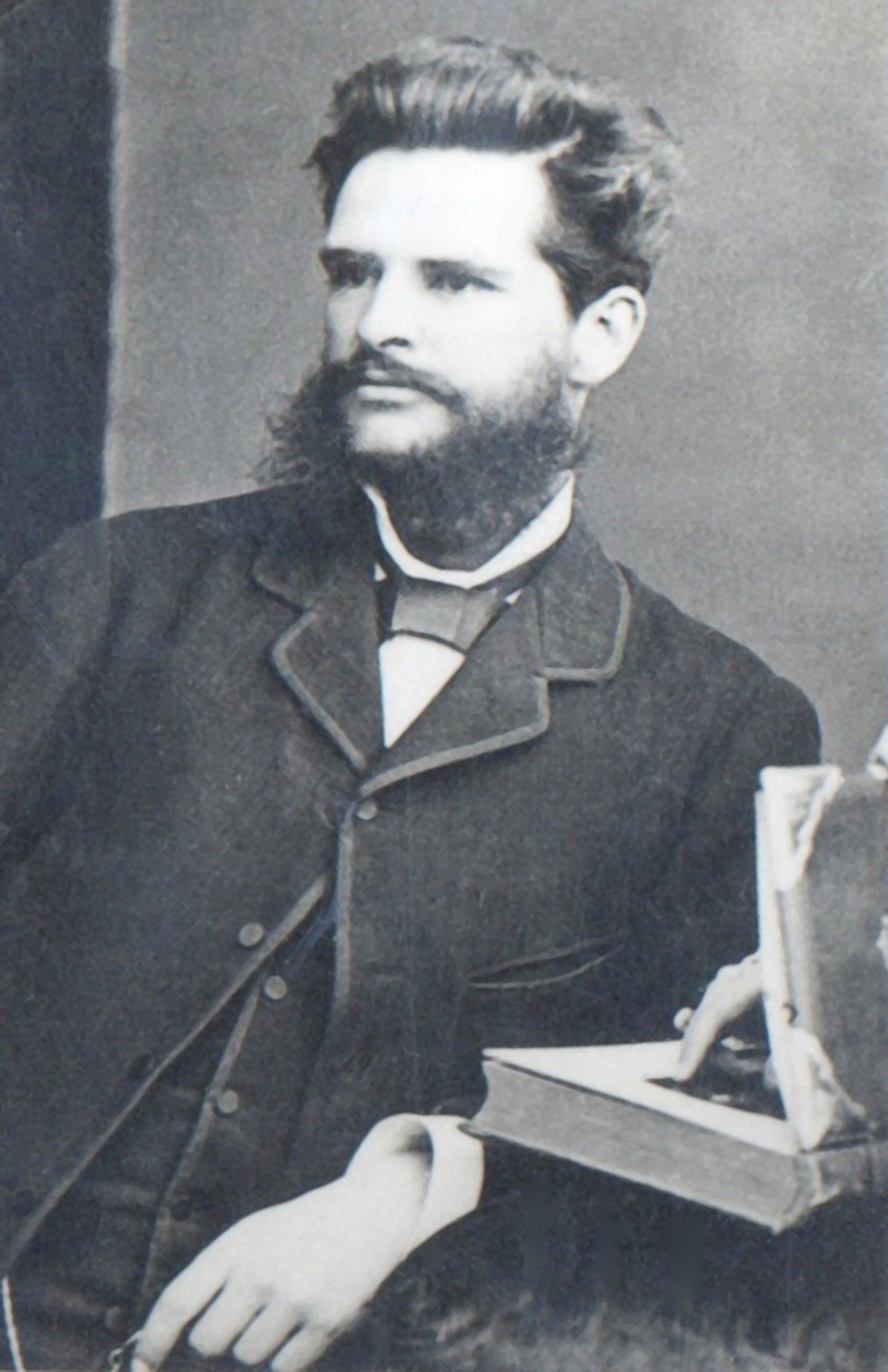

President of Bolivia
- Acting
- In office 17 April 1879 – 10 September 1879
- Preceded by: Hilarión Daza (provisional)
- Succeeded by: Serapio Reyes Ortiz (acting)

Minister of the Interior
- In office 9 August 1845 – 25 November 1847
- President: José Ballivián
- Preceded by: Pedro Buitrago
- Succeeded by: Tomás Frías

Personal details
- Born: 4 December 1809 La Paz, Bolivia
- Died: 10 September 1879 (aged 69) La Paz, Bolivia
- Spouse: Maria Rynd
- Children: María Andrea de Guerra y Rynd; José Eduardo de Guerra y Rynd
- Parents: José de Guerra y Olazo; María Andrea Sánchez de Bustamante y Peñaranda

Pedro José Domingo de Guerra (4 December 1809 – 10 September 1879) was a Bolivian jurist who served as the acting President of Bolivia in 1879 in the absence of Hilarión Daza who was personally commanding the Bolivian Army in the War of the Pacific between Chile, and an allied Bolivia and Peru. His grandson, José Gutiérrez Guerra, was also president of Bolivia between 1917 and 1920.

== Early life and family ==
Born into a family with roots in the Spanish colonial nobility, he won enviable distinction as a statesman, jurist, and diplomat. Completing his primary and secondary studies in the city of his birth, he moved to Sucre to continue his post-secondary studies. He graduated from the Universidad Mayor, Real y Pontificia de San Francisco Xavier de Chuquisaca as a lawyer in June 1829.

A philanthropist and considered a man of high integrity, in tune with the social needs of his time, he founded the Philological Society in La Paz with José Joaquín de Mora and engaged in several charitable activities.

== Political career ==
=== Diplomatic roles ===
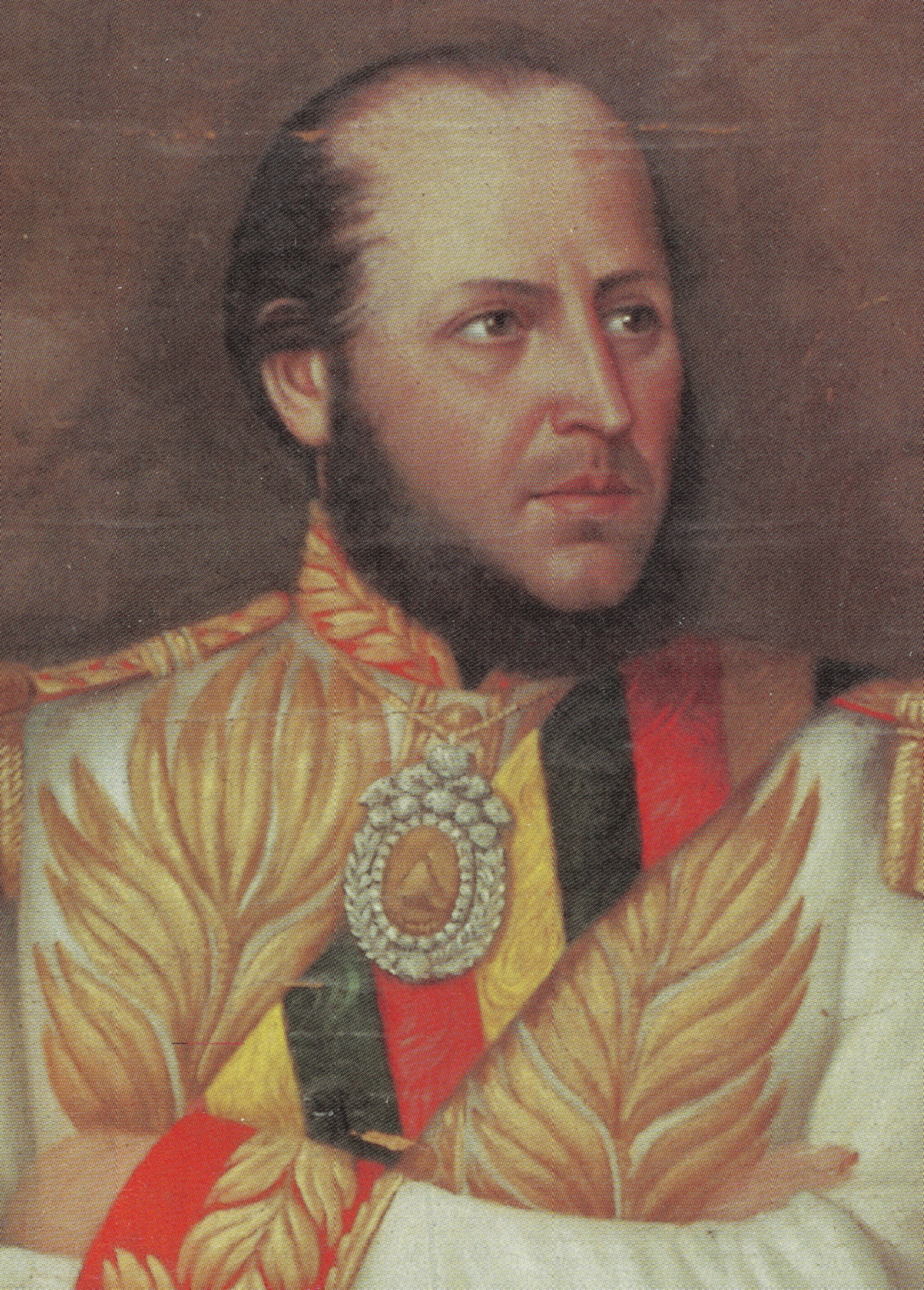
José Ballivián, under whom Guerra served as Minister of the Interior between 1845 and 1847.

Years later, he traveled to Peru to study international law, for which he was appointed as Consul of Bolivia before the Government of Lima by the members of the ruling party at the time. He held the position until 1834.

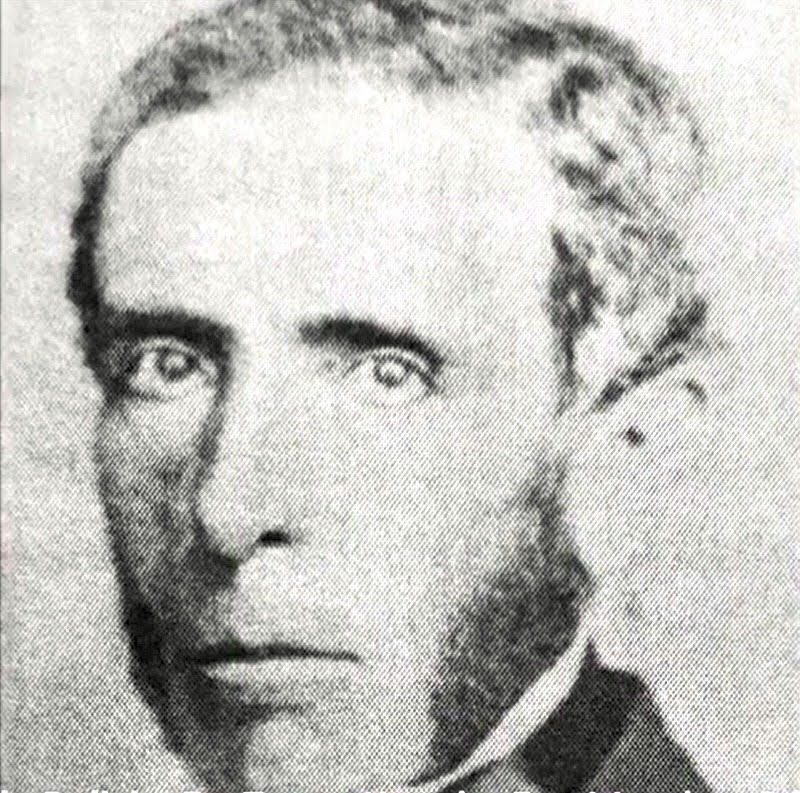
Linares appointed Guerra as chief justice of the Supreme Court.

In the late 1830s, he served as Bolivia's consul in Paris and minister plenipotentiary to the Court of St. James's. There, he met and, in 1840, married the scion of an aristocratic Anglo-Irish family, Lady Maria Rynd. She was the stepdaughter of Admiral Thomas Brown, the niece of physician Francis Rynd and a maternal relative of Lord Palmerston. After the collapse of the Peru–Bolivian Confederation, Guerra returned to Bolivia and was assigned as minister plenipotentiary in Lima, a role he occupied until 1843.

During his time in Lima, he was charged with a project that was far too ambitious for its time, a first attempt to lay the groundwork for a treaty that would integrate the Empire of Brazil, Chile, Bolivia, Peru, Ecuador and the Republic of New Granada into an "American Union", exclusive of the United States of America. This idea would fail and would not be seriously pursued by the governments followed Ballivián.

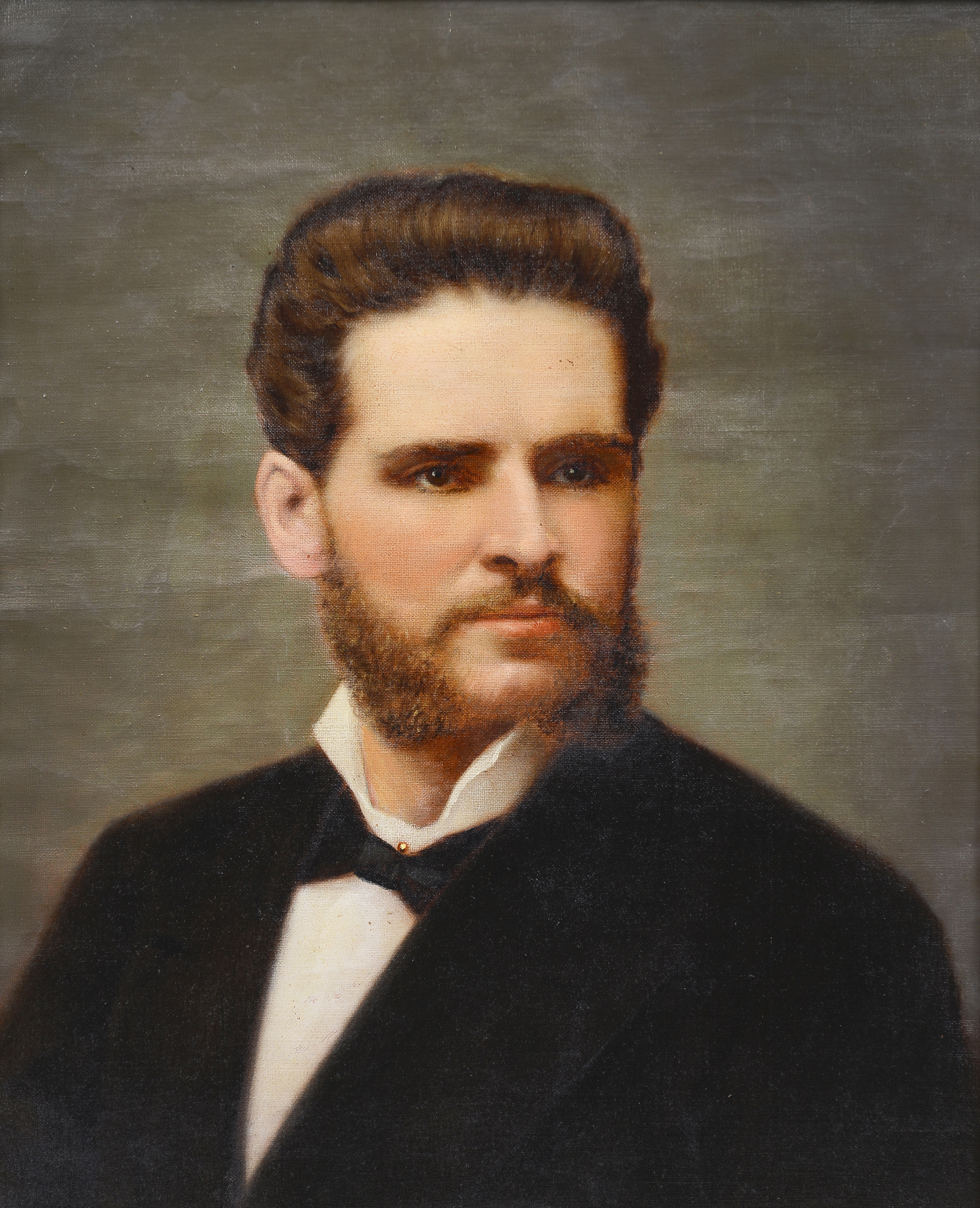
Oil portrait of President Guerra,

=== Ministerial and judicial roles ===
In 1845, he was appointed as Minister of the Interior during the presidency of José Ballivián, an office he was in charge of until 1847.

Guerra served first as justice, and then chief justice, of the Supreme Court, a position he held between 1859 and 1861, the year that civilian President José María Linares was overthrown by José María de Achá. During his tenure, he reformed much of the judiciary and of the legal and criminal proceedings of the time. Guerra was replaced alongside several other judges that had served under Linares, as President Achá wanted to rid the Supreme Court of any remaining Linaristas. Guerra would be one of the leading opposition leaders during the Achá presidency and constantly barraged the President and his allies in the press and through individual pamphlets which became widely popular throughout the country.

However, with Achá's imminent overthrow in 1864, Guerra decided to ally himself with the president, as he was more opposed to Manuel Isidoro Belzu and Mariano Melgarejo. For this, he was made a magistrate that year, a position he held even after Achá's overthrow.

Guerra remained in the Supreme Court well into the dictatorships of Melgarejo and Agustín Morales. However, after nearly four decades of serving his country as minister, diplomat, and magistrate, Guerra officially retired on June 17, 1873. Guerra would return to politics with the outbreak of the War of the Pacific.

== The War of the Pacific ==
=== Prelude and declaration of war ===
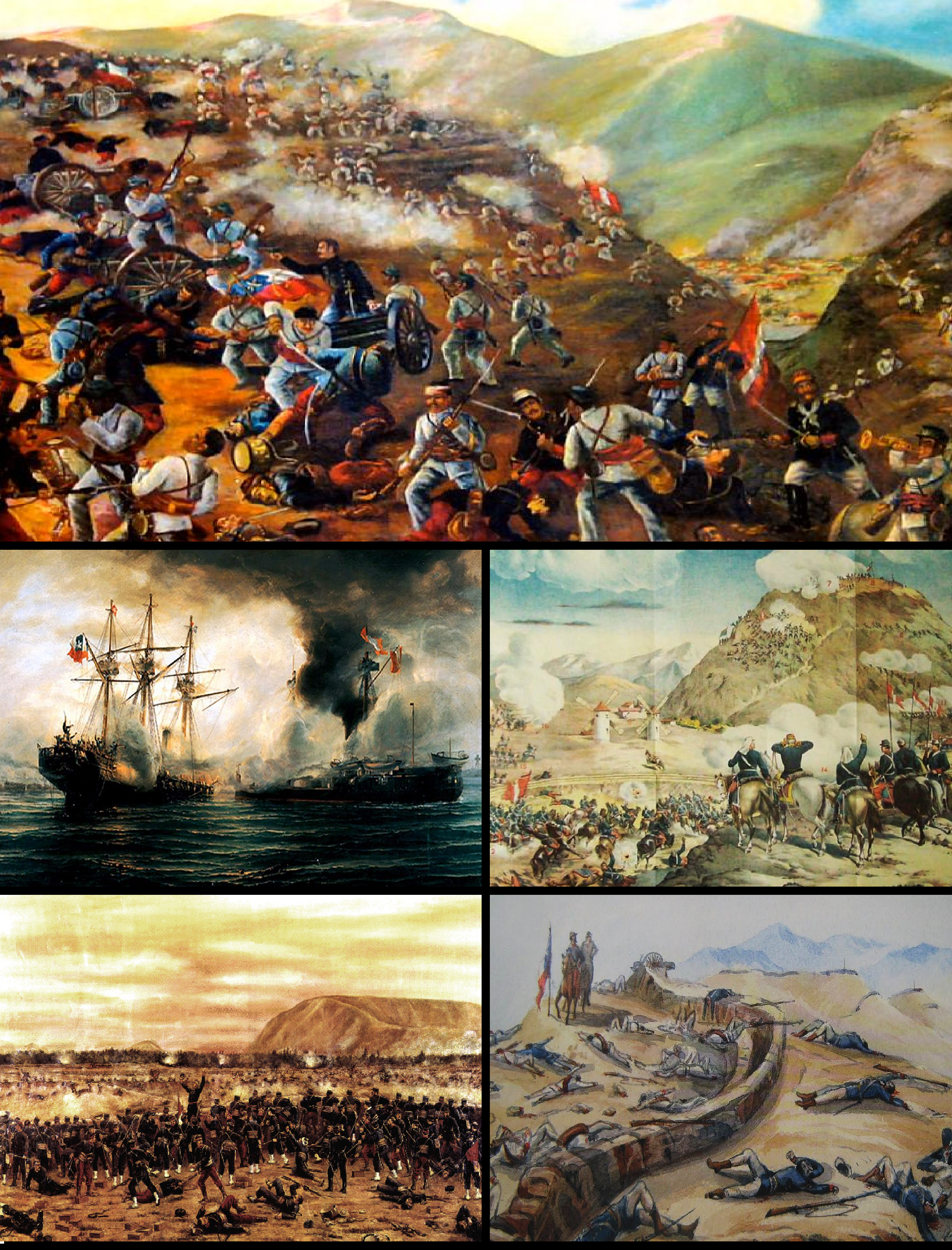
Scenes of the War of the Pacific.

On November 17, 1878, the government of La Paz ordered the prefect of the department of Cobija, Severino Zapata, to enforce the 10-cent tax established by the Law of February 14, 1878 in an attempt to counteract the serious economic crisis in Bolivia. This violated an agreement signed in 1873 with the Compañía de Salitres y Ferrocarriles de Antofagasta, which stipulated that the company could not be taxed until twenty-five years after the signing of the treaty. Thus, originating the casus belli for Chile.

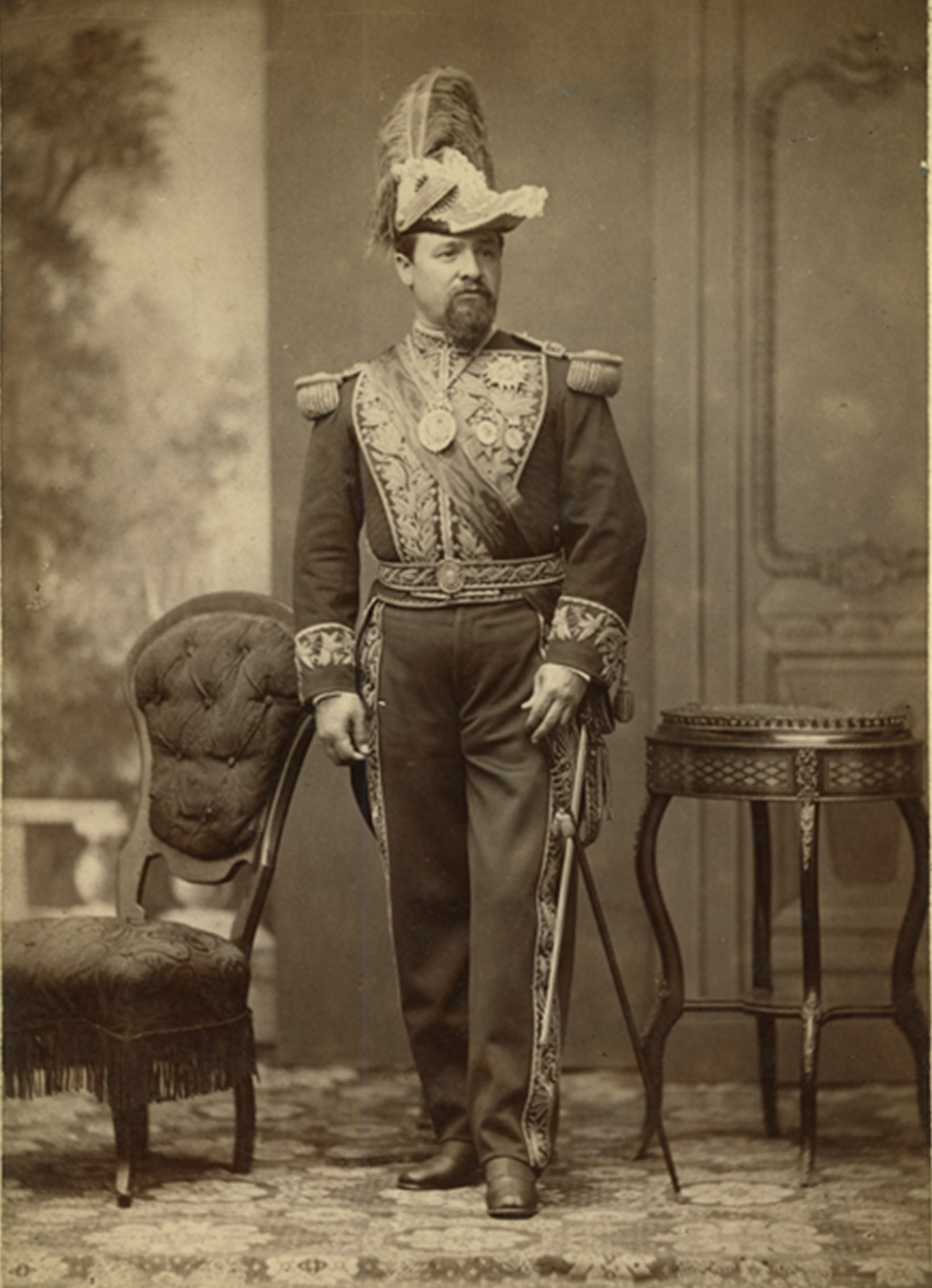
Daza's supreme decree of April 17, 1879, which declared him Supreme Commander of the Bolivian Army left Guerra as Acting President of Bolivia.

Subsequently, on February 1, 1879, the government of Bolivia unilaterally rescinded the contract, suspending the effects of the law of February 14, 1878, and decided to claim the saltpeter fields occupied by the Compañía de Salitres y Ferrocarriles de Antofagasta. They proceeded to auction the assets of the company in order to collect the unpaid taxes, using armed force in the process. The auction was scheduled for February 14, 1879. President Hilarión Daza ignored the probability of Chilean retaliation. Chile occupied Antofagasta that same February 14, 1879, frustrating the auction. Daza, citing invasion as a casus belli, declared war on Chile. The secret treaty between Peru and Bolivia signed in 1873 in which former pledged to support the latter militarily in case of conflict with Chile. Chile declared war on Bolivia on March 5, 1879, and proceeded to occupy the Bolivian coast, asserting old unresolved territorial claims regarding the coast between those parallels.

== Acting President ==
=== Daza's campaign and Guerra's death ===
The war began with the complete and virtually unchallenged occupation by Chile of the Bolivian Litoral. Peru entered the war shortly after, but the Chileans made deep pushes into the Bolivian and Peruvian coastline territories. President Daza would decide to personally take command of the army and left Bolivia in the process, where Guerra assumed the position of Acting President as the President of the Council of Ministers that had been left in charge of the country.

Daza led the army to Tacna, and after the Chilean landing in Pisagua, he marched south to support the Peruvian Army stationed in Iquique. After staying in Arica briefly, he continued marching. However, after three days of marching along the Camarones ravine, he announced to Peruvian President Mariano Ignacio Prado that his troops refused to continue due to the harsh conditions of the desert, opting to return to Arica. Daza's telegram to Prado on November 16 read, "Desert overwhelms, army refuses to move forward," verbatim. This decision significantly affected the direction of the war, leaving Peru virtually alone in the conflict. Daza was overthrown in a coup in December 1879, however, Guerra did not witness any of these events as he died in office on September 10 of that year, aged 69.

Political offices
Preceded by Hilarión Daza	President of Bolivia; 1879	Succeeded by Serapio Reyes Ortiz
