= Mariano Baptista =

23rd President of Bolivia

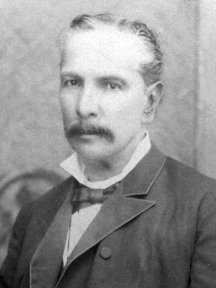

23rd President of Bolivia
- In office 11 August 1892 – 19 August 1896
- Vice President: Severo Fernández; Vacant (Note: The second vice presidency remains vacant due to the death of Juan Federico Zuazo before taking office.)
- Preceded by: Aniceto Arce
- Succeeded by: Severo Fernández

6th Vice President of Bolivia
- First Vice President
- In office 4 September 1884 – 15 August 1888 Serving with Jorge Oblitas
- President: Gregorio Pacheco
- Preceded by: Aniceto Arce
- Succeeded by: José Manuel del Carpio

Minister of Foreign Affairs and Worship
- In office 23 October 1888 – 26 January 1891
- President: Aniceto Arce
- Preceded by: Juan Francisco Velarde
- Succeeded by: Serapio Reyes Ortiz

Minister of Foreign Affairs and Government
- In office 9 May 1873 – 4 May 1876
- President: Adolfo Ballivián; Tomás Frías
- Preceded by: Melchor Terrazas
- Succeeded by: Jorge Oblitas

Minister of Finance
- In office 12 August 1873 – 27 September 1873
- President: Adolfo Ballivián
- Preceded by: Rafael Bustillo
- Succeeded by: Pantaleón Dalence

Personal details
- Born: Mariano Baptista Caserta; 16 July 1831 Calchani, Cochabamba, Bolivia
- Died: 19 March 1907 (aged 74) Cochabamba, Bolivia
- Party: Conservative
- Spouse: Gabina Terrazas
- Parent(s): José Manuel Baptista; Petrona Caserta
- Relatives: Mariano Baptista Gumucio (grandson)
- Education: University of Saint Francis Xavier

Mariano Baptista Caserta (16 July 1832 – 19 March 1907, Cochabamba) was a Bolivian politician, orator and journalist. An outstanding intellectual of his time, he was a deputy in various periods, Minister of Foreign Affairs (1873-1876) and (1888-1891), President of Congress (1884-1888), Constitutional President of the Republic (1892-1896) and Vice President of the Republic (1884-1888).

== Early life ==
=== Youth and studies ===
Son of José Manuel Baptista and Petrona Caserta, he studied law at the Universidad Mayor, Real y Pontificia de San Francisco Xavier de Chuquisaca. He stood out in his youth for his talent and skills as an orator and public speaker. He received his law degree in 1857, but never practiced as a lawyer.

From a very young age, Baptista ventured into journalism. Alongside his close friend Daniel Calvo, he was founder and director of El Porvenir de Sucre (1855). A militant Catholic, he was director of the Cochabamba Seminary, as well as a professor of History and Literature.

=== Political career ===
In 1855, despite his young age, he was elected and admitted as a deputy for Chuquisaca. He collaborated with the dictator José María Linares, whom he accompanied in his exile and death later in the year of 1861. During the government of Mariano Melgarejo, he was persecuted and had to emigrate to Europe, where he remained for three years. After Melgarejo was overthrown on January 15, 1871, a Constituent Assembly was formed to decide the future of the nation. From Paris, he applied for representation in the Constituent Assembly of 1871, which he won, prompting his return to Bolivia.

== Tensions with Chile and the War of the Pacific ==
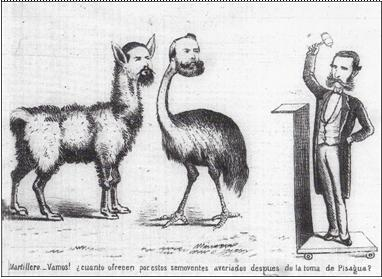
A cartoon of the War of the Pacific, mocking the "ineptitude" of Generals Daza and Mariano Ignacio Prado.

During the government of Adolfo Ballivián, he was appointed Minister of Foreign Affairs, and, as such, signed the Bolivian-Chilean Boundary Treaty with the Chilean representative Carlos Walker Martínez in Sucre on August 6, 1874. Said treaty modified the 1866 treaty, setting the 24th parallel as the border between Bolivia and Chile, and establishing a kind of condominium between the 23rd and 25th parallels, both in terms of the exploitation of guano and customs duties. What is stipulated in article IV of said treaty should be highlighted: that the export rights of the minerals exploited in the aforementioned territory should not be increased and that no new taxes would be created on Chilean companies, capital and industrialists, during a period of twenty five years. Years later, Bolivia's failure to comply with said article, through the seizure of the goods and auction of the Compañía de Salitres y Ferrocarril de Antofagasta, would be the cause of the start of the War of the Pacific in 1879.

During the War of the Pacific, Baptista carried out various diplomatic missions and defended a peaceful resolution with Chile with remarkable eloquence. His beliefs regarding the war were that Bolivia should abandon the alliance with Peru and seek an arrangement with Chile. He participated together with Crisóstomo Carrillo in the Bolivian delegation at the Arica Conference held on October 22, 25 and 27, 1880, in Arica aboard the American schooner Lackawanna, convened by the Secretary of State of the United States William Evarts. Representatives from Chile were Eulogio Altamirano Aracena, José Francisco Vergara and Eusebio Lillo. From Peru Antonio Arenas and Aurelio García y García represented their country.

=== Postwar career and Vicepresidency ===
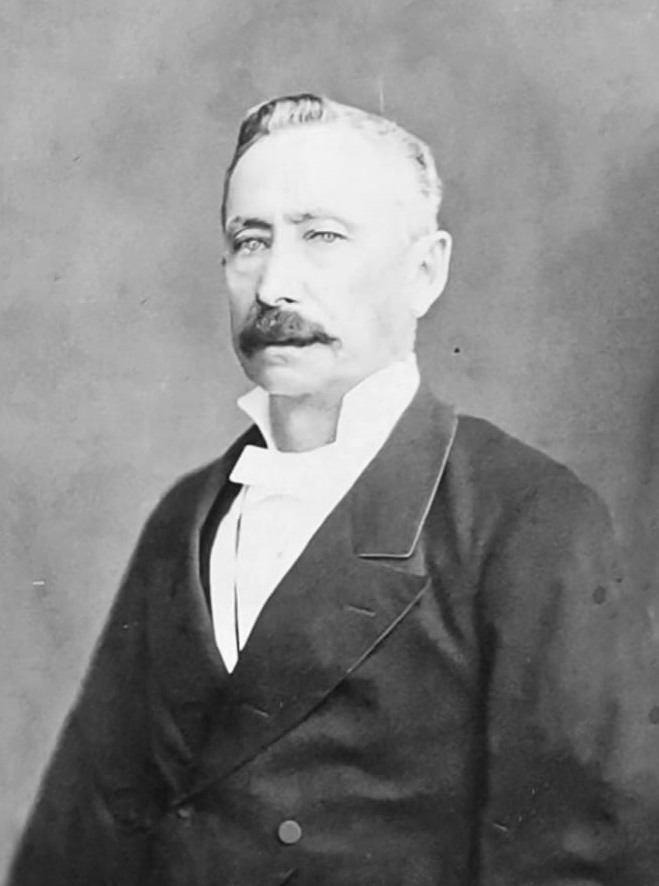
Gregorio Pacheco, under whom Baptista served as Vicepresident (1884-1888).

During the government of Gregorio Pacheco (1884-1888), he held the first vice presidency of the Republic and the presidency of Congress. However, Baptista would constantly clash in Congress with Pacheco's protégé Atanasio de Urioste Velasco. During the government of Aniceto Arce he was Minister of Foreign Affairs (1888-1891).

At the end of Arce's term, Baptista launched his candidacy for the presidency with the government's support. However, his victory was jeopardized as none of the candidates obtained the necessary majority, so the election had to be decided by Congress. Being evident that Baptista's contender had more supporters in Congress, President Arce declared a state of siege, deported eight Liberal deputies and annulled the credentials of another twenty-one, calling alternates. Thus, he obtained a congressional majority and was then able to win the presidency, which he assumed on August 10, 1892.

== President of Bolivia ==
=== Administration ===
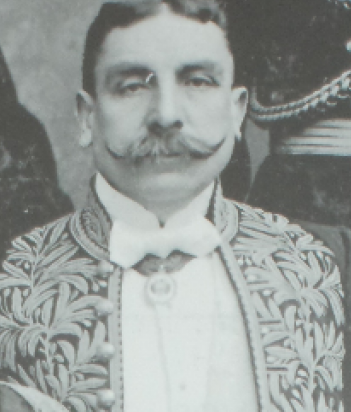
Francisco Argandoña, the wealthiest man during Batista's presidency.

Already sworn in as president, Baptista lifted the state of siege and promulgated an amnesty that allowed the return of expatriates, including former general and president Hilarión Daza, who, however, was assassinated upon arrival at the Uyuni railway station. One of Baptista's first decrees was the creation of the Banco Francisco Argandoña (Argandoña Bank), through the Law of October 22, 1892. The bank was authorized to issue, discount, loan and deposit currency. The bank was inaugurated the following year, with headquarters in Sucre. Initially a public corporation, years later becomes a Limited Company after having grown rapidly and expanded with branches in Cochabamba, Oruro and Potosí. The bank's owner, Francisco Argandoña, Prince of La Glorieta, was one of the wealthiest men in the country and a brother-in-law to Atanasio de Urioste Velasco, Baptista's rival. Regardless, Argandoña was a key ally to the government.

Baptista encouraged geographical exploration and colonization, being greatly concerned about the further loss of sparsely populated territories. Important expeditions were made to the northeast of the Republic. He continued the works of his predecessor, especially with regard to expanding the road network, and began the construction of the Sucre government palace. He strove to improve public education, creating new schools and setting up arts and crafts establishments under the direction of the Salesian religious order. He founded the universities of Oruro and Potosí (1892).

=== Foreign Policy ===
Baptista tried to carry out a policy of rapprochement with Chile, sending Heriberto Gutiérrez as plenipotentiary minister of Bolivia to Santiago, who signed, together with the Chilean Foreign Minister Luis Barros Borgoño, the Treaty of May 18, 1895 in which Chilean sovereignty over Antofagasta was recognized. The treaty that was provisional until the signing of the 1904 Treaty. He also signed boundary treaties with Argentina (Puna de Atacama), Paraguay (Chaco boreal), Brazil and Peru (Madre de Dios Basin). His term ended in 1896 and he was succeeded by Severo Fernández.

== Death and legacy ==
Retired from politics after the end of his term, Baptista died in Cochabamba in 1907. Baptista's presidency was one of the most stable in the 19th century, however, the dominance of the Conservative Party, which was based in Sucre, would galvanize the Liberal Party, based in La Paz, which would later rise up in revolt against the government, leading to the Bolivian Civil War in 1899. Baptists would fail during his presidency to solve the massive differences between the two parties.

== Political views ==
He was a supporter of Anti-positivism, Anti-liberalism and Anti-socialism.

Political offices
Preceded by Melchor Terrazas	Minister of Foreign Affairs and Government; 1873–1876	Succeeded by Jorge Oblitas
Vacant Title last held by Aniceto Arce	Vice President of Bolivia; First Vice President; 1884–1888; Served alongside: Jorge Oblitas	Succeeded by José Manuel del Carpio
Preceded by Juan Francisco Velarde	Minister of Foreign Affairs and Worship; 1888–1891	Succeeded by Serapio Reyes Ortiz
Preceded by Aniceto Arce	President of Bolivia; 1892–1896	Succeeded by Severo Fernández
Party political offices
Preceded by Aniceto Arce	Conservative nominee for President of Bolivia; 1892	Succeeded by Severo Fernández
