= Belisario Salinas =

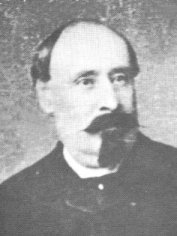

5th Vice President of Bolivia
- Second Vice President
- In office 31 May 1880 – 4 September 1884 Serving with Aniceto Arce
- President: Narciso Campero
- Preceded by: Mariano Enrique Calvo
- Succeeded by: Jorge Oblitas

Personal details
- Born: Belisario Salinas Belzu; 19 February 1833 La Paz, Bolivia
- Died: 17 July 1893 (aged 60) La Paz, Bolivia
- Party: Conservative Party
- Education: Higher University of San Andrés

Belisario Salinas Belzu (19 February 1833 – 17 July 1893) was a Bolivian lawyer, teacher, and politician who served as the fifth vice president of Bolivia from 1880 to 1884. He served as second vice president alongside first vice president Aniceto Arce during the administration of Narciso Campero.

== Early life ==
Belisario Salinas was born on 10 February 1883 in La Paz, Bolivia. In 1855, following the completion of his high school education, Salinas left Bolivia and traveled to Europe where he stayed for two years. He returned to Bolivia in 1857 to obtain a law degree at the Higher University of San Andrés where he graduated as a lawyer in 1862. That same year, he became a professor of law at the university and French language professor at the La Paz seminary.

== Political life ==
Between 1863 and 1864, at age 30, Salinas held the position of deputy representing Sica Sica province in the National Congress. Notably, Salinas was very close to former president Manuel Isidoro Belzu, in whom he supported in his ultimately failed attempt to retake the presidency. On 23 March 1865, Belzu was assassinated by Mariano Melgarejo. Upon the death of Belzu, Salinas fled the new Melgarejo government to Peru where in 1868 he served as a French teacher at the seminary school in Puno.

He returned to Bolivia following the fall of Melgarejo, being again elected deputy for the Pacajes province in 1871. Later, he once again became deputy for Sica Sica from 1872 to 1873, being later also appointed state councilor. Salinas held the position of prefect of the department of La Paz from 1873 to 1875.

== Vice president (1880–1884) ==
In 1877, during the government of President Hilarión Daza, Salinas was arrested and imprisoned as an opponent of the Daza government. However, following the Chilean occupation of the Bolivian port of Antofagasta on 14 February 1879, he was released and appointed war auditor. Months later, he served an important role in the overthrow of Hilarión Daza in the midst of the War of the Pacific in late December 1879.

On 31 May 1880, the National Convention elected Narciso Campero president and established a dual form of vice presidents. Aniceto Arce was elected first vice president while Belisario Salinas became second vice president. As Arce was expelled by Campero due to disagreement on 11 March 1881, it was Salinas who exercised executive power as acting president while Campero was absent for work or health reasons.

Salinas stepped down from the vice presidency on 4 September 1884 upon the end of his term.

== Later years and death ==
After 21 years, between 1863 and 1884, in politics, Salinas retired from public life.

Belisario Salinas died in La Paz on 17 July 1893 at the age of 60.

Political offices
Preceded by Mariano Enrique Calvo	Vice President of Bolivia; Second Vice President; 1880–1884; Served alongside: Aniceto Arce	Succeeded by Jorge Oblitas
