= Jorge Oblitas =

Bolivian politician

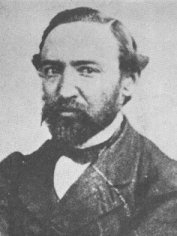

7th Vice President of Bolivia
- Second Vice President
- In office September 4, 1884 – August 15, 1888 Serving with Mariano Baptista
- President: Gregorio Pacheco
- Preceded by: Belisario Salinas
- Succeeded by: Serapio Reyes Ortiz

Foreign Minister of Bolivia
- In office 4 September 1884 – 22 October 1885
- President: Gregorio Pacheco
- Preceded by: Nataniel Aguirre
- Succeeded by: Macedonio Doria Medina
- In office 4 May 1876 – 17 August 1877
- President: Hilarión Daza
- Preceded by: Mariano Baptista
- Succeeded by: José Manuel del Carpio

Personal details
- Born: Jorge Oblitas Mendizábal; 23 April 1831 Oruro, Bolivia
- Died: 24 December 1900 (aged 69) Cochabamba, Bolivia
- Party: Conservative

Jorge Oblitas Mendizábal (23 April 1831 – 24 December 1900) was a Bolivian politician who served as the seventh vice president of Bolivia from 1884 to 1888. He served as second vice president alongside first vice president Mariano Baptista during the administration of Gregorio Pacheco.

Political offices
Preceded by Mariano Baptista	Foreign Minister of Bolivia; 1876–1877	Succeeded by José Manuel del Carpio
Preceded by Belisario Salinas	Vice President of Bolivia; Second Vice President; 1884–1888; Served alongside: Mariano Baptista	Succeeded by Serapio Reyes Ortiz
Preceded by Nataniel Aguirre	Foreign Minister of Bolivia; 1884–1885	Succeeded by Macedonio Doria Medina
