= Agustín Saavedra Weise =

Bolivian diplomat and writer (1943–2021)

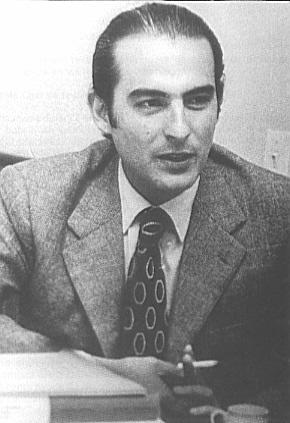
- Born: 19 November 1943
- Died: 26 December 2021 (aged 78)
- Occupations: Diplomat, writer
- Known for: Serving as Ambassador to Switzerland and Argentina, foreign minister, President of Central Bank of Bolivia

Agustín Saavedra Weise (19 November 1943 – 26 December 2021) was a Bolivian diplomat and writer. He served as Ambassador to Switzerland and Argentina and ambassador-at-large in several foreign missions and was a foreign minister (1982). He wrote more than 10 books and hundreds of notes and articles. He was appointed the President of Central Bank of Bolivia in October 2020.

Saavedra Weise died on 26 December 2021, at the age of 78.

Political offices
Preceded by Gonzalo Romero Álvarez García	Foreign Minister of Bolivia; 1982	Succeeded by Mario Velarde Dorado
