= Narciso Campero =

20th President of Bolivia (1813-1896)

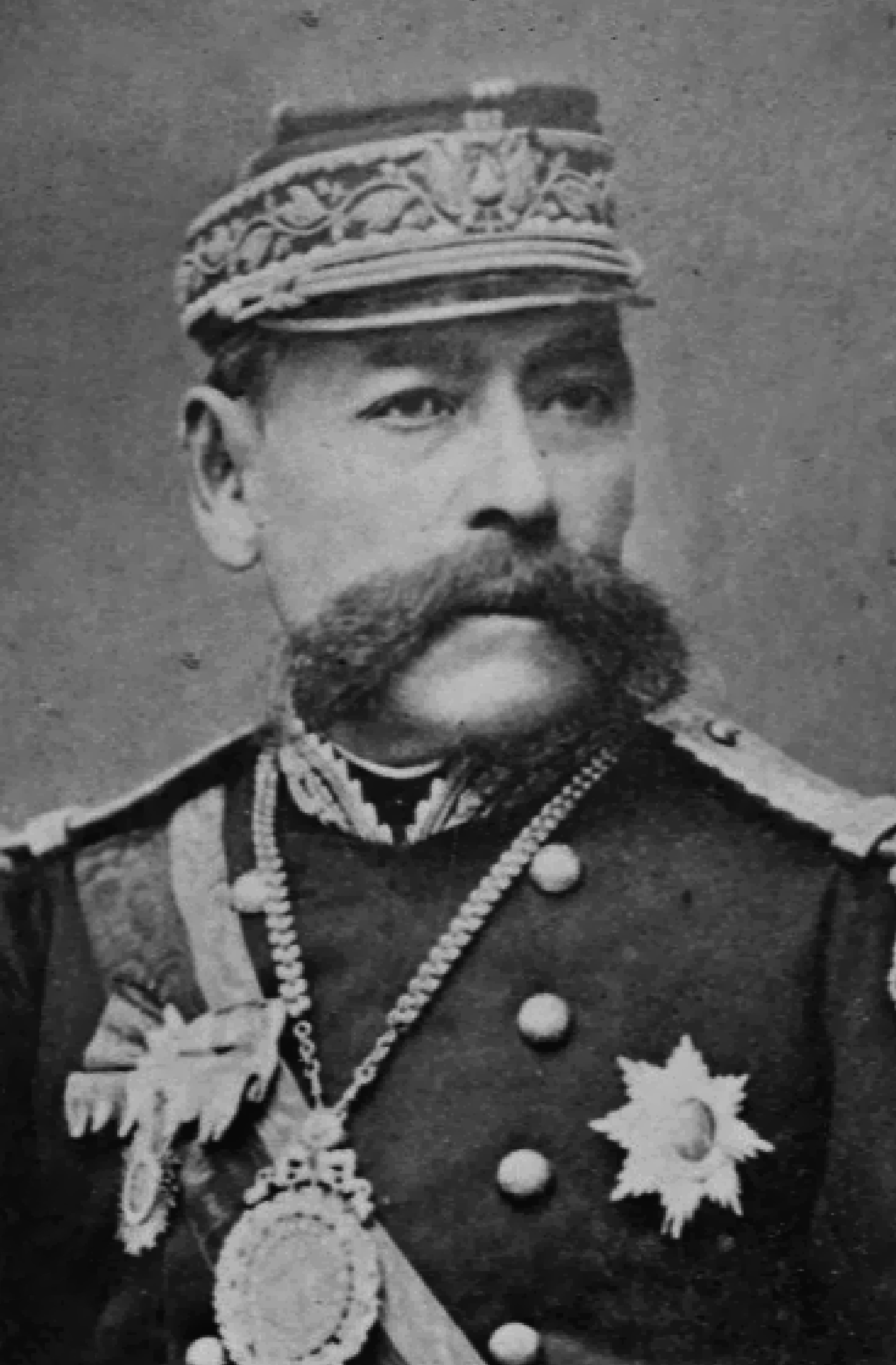

20th President of Bolivia
- In office 19 January 1880 – 4 September 1884; Provisional: 19 January 1880 – 31 May 1880
- Vice President: Aniceto Arce (1880–1881); Belisario Salinas
- Preceded by: Uladislao Silva (President of the Junta); Serapio Reyes Ortiz (acting); Hilarión Daza (provisional)
- Succeeded by: Gregorio Pacheco

Minister of War
- In office 22 June 1871 – 22 October 1871
- President: Agustín Morales
- Preceded by: Gonzalo García Lanza
- Succeeded by: Ildefonso Sanjinés

Personal details
- Born: Narciso Campero Leyes; 29 October 1813 Tarija, Viceroyalty of the Río de la Plata (now Bolivia)
- Died: 12 August 1896 (aged 82) Sucre, Bolivia
- Party: Liberal Party
- Other political affiliations: Independent
- Spouse: Lindaura Anzoátegui Campero
- Parent(s): Felipe Campero; Florencia Leyes
- Relatives: Gregorio Pacheco (cousin)
- Education: University of Saint Francis Xavier

Military service
- Allegiance: Bolivia
- Branch/service: Bolivian Army
- Rank: General
- Battles/wars: Peruvian-Bolivian War of 1841-1842; Battle of Ingavi; War of the Pacific; Battle of Alto de la Alianza

Narciso Campero Leyes (29 October 1813 – 12 August 1896) was a Bolivian general and politician who served as the 20th president of Bolivia from 1880 to 1884. He was a member of the Liberal Party. The Narciso Campero Province was named after him.

== Early life and family ==
=== The Campero family ===
A descendant of the holders of the Marquisate of Yavi and Valle de Tojo, he was the son of Felipe Campero, son of the third marquis Juan José Gervasio Fernández Camperon, and Florencia Leyes. Therefore, he was the nephew of Colonel of the United Provinces of the Río de la Plata, Juan José Feliciano Fernández Campero IV Marquis of Valle de Tojo, who was one of the leaders of the montoneras de gauchos under the command of General Martín Miguel de Güemes.

=== Beginning of his military career ===
He studied law at the Universidad Mayor Real y Pontificia San Francisco Xavier de Chuquisaca, but soon changed to a career of arms. He began his military career at the Battle of Ingavi in 1841 and later studied at the French Military Academy of Saint Cyr while serving as secretary of the Bolivian legation in France. As part of his military training, he participated in the Algerian campaign under the command of the Duke of Aumale, an event that would be recorded in his memoirs. Like many other members of the elite of his time, he entered into Freemasonry, allowing him to befriend the most prominent figures in the political world of the region. Upon his return to Bolivia, he entered political life as a supporter of José María de Achá, but when he Melgarejo ousted him, Campero was exiled to Chile and Argentina. Later, he would become a trusted man of the caudillo Mariano Melgarejo.

=== Melgarejo's coup and the death of Belzu ===
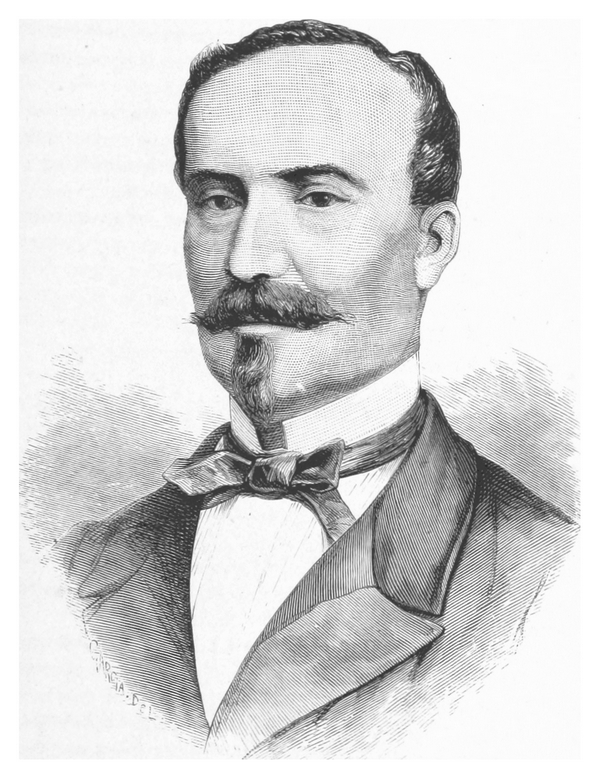
Campero was a staunch detractor of Manuel Isidoro Belzu.

Campero participated in the tragic events of 26 March 1865, when a rebellion led by former president Manuel Isidoro Belzu, with the support of the popular masses of La Paz, expelled Melgarejo from the city. Belzu proclaimed himself head of state, however, Melgarejo, aware of his imminent defeat, entered the city making his way through the crowd and asked to have meeting with the populist caudillo. Once Melgarejo reached the Palacio Quemado, to the surprise of Belzu and his companions, he entered the Palace with his sword drawn, uttering insults. Campero stood between Melgarejo and Belzu, begging him to spare his life. Melgarejo ignored Campero's pleas and fired his pistol, killing his rival on the spot. To the shock of the crowd gathered at the Plaza Murillo, Melgarejo appeared on the Palace balcony and declared: "Belzu is dead. Who lives now?" and the crowd gave a bestial cry: "Long live Melgarejo!"

According to Narciso Campero's memoirs, Belzu's corpse was left on the first floor of the Palacio Quemado. Later, Belzu's now widow, Juana Manuela Gorriti, the famous Argentine writer, came to claim him. After these events, Narciso Campero was appointed prefect of La Paz.

=== Brief retirement ===
Campero would later distance himself from Melgarejo and retire to private life. In 1871, he was appointed Minister of War and moved to Sucre, where he married Lindaura Anzoátegui Campero. In July 1872, he was appointed Minister Plenipotentiary of Bolivia before the governments of Great Britain, France and Italy.

== The War of the Pacific ==
=== The outbreak ===
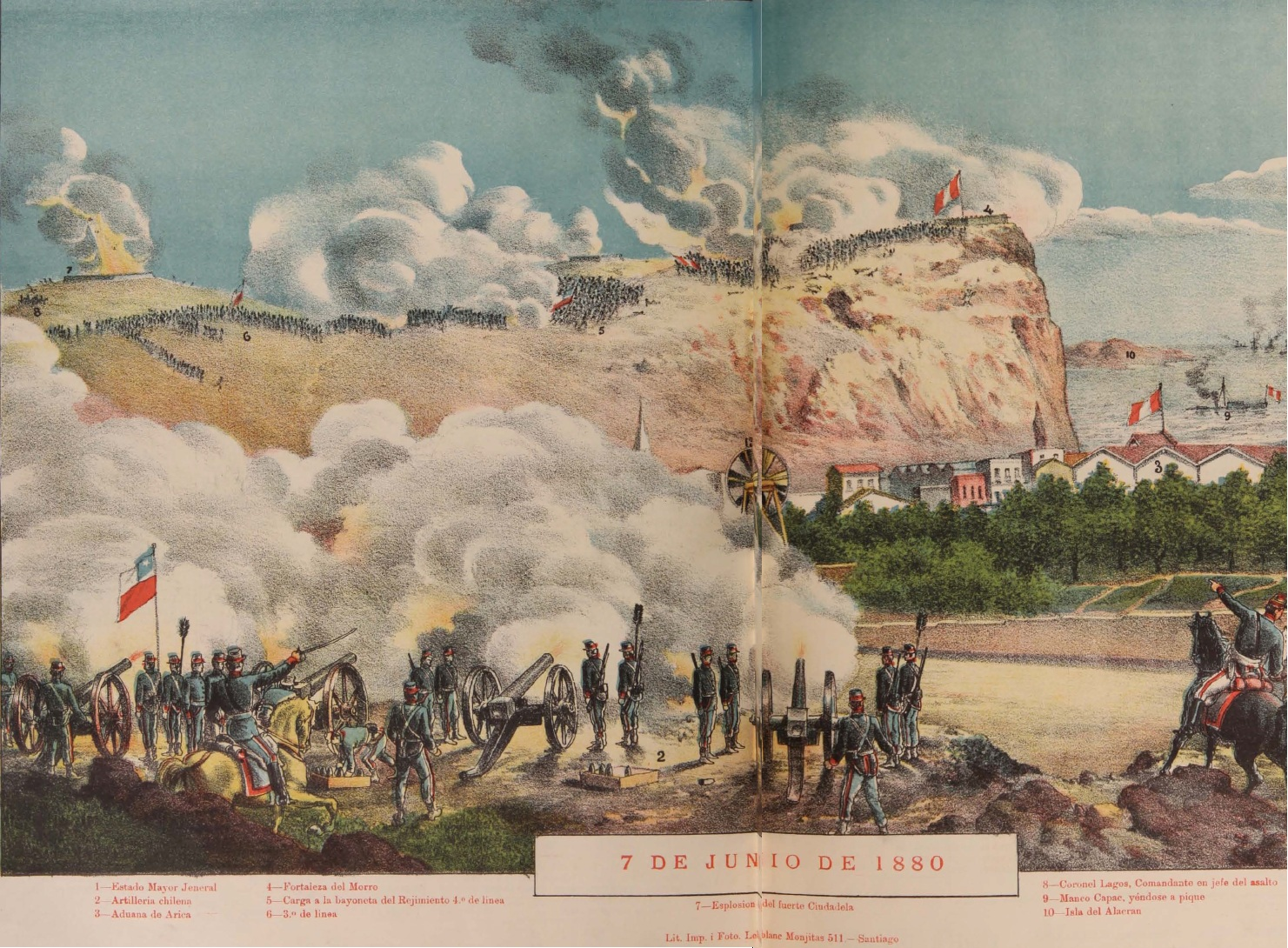
The Battle of Arica during the War of the Pacific.

Upon his return, he was appointed Prefect of Potosí and, later, imprisoned for a few months as a result of the fall of President Tomás Frías. The outbreak of the war with Chile in 1879 motivated him to offer his services to President Hilarión Daza, who ordered him to raise a military division with recruits from the southern departments of Bolivia, mainly Tarija and Potosí. Campero was given the mission to reconquer Calama from the hands of the Chilean Army, with the intention of recovering Antofagasta.

==== The 5th Division and Daza's downfall ====
His performance in this mission is the subject of controversy among historians. Alcides Arguedas maintains that Campero wandered through the southern Bolivian mountain range as a result of Daza's contradictory orders and whims. Other authors such as José Mesa, Teresa Gisbert and Carlos Mesa Gisbert claim that Campero did not order the entry into action of his forces because he was in collusion with the mining businessmen headed by Aniceto Arce, who had commercial interests in partnership with Chilean investors in the Pacific coast. The interpretations of Mesa, Gisbert and Mesa Gisbert have fed revisionist interpretations of this historical moment, which were reflected in the 1989 Bolivian film, Bitter Sea by Antonio Eguino.

Map of the disputed territory between Chile and Bolivia.

Given the lack of military coordination within Campero's division, it was called the "Wanderer" or "Israelite", as it wandered aimlessly in the desert, and without a precise military objective. The only relevant military action this division saw was the Battle of Tambillo, where Bolivian soldiers defeated a Chilean advance guard, an opportunity that was exploited by Campero, who could have retaken Calama. However, it was squandered since he received orders from Daza to fall back to Oruro. While the campaign was unfolding, a conspiracy to overthrow Daza was initiated and ended with his removal from the presidency and the command of the army in November 1879.

== President of Bolivia ==
=== Crisis and the establishment of the oligarchic republic ===
Campero assumed the provisional presidency at the request of a Board of Notables meeting in La Paz after the overthrow of Hilarión Daza in December 1879. A Junta was established in la Paz under the presidency of Uladislao Silva and declared Campero to be provisional President. In 1880, a Convention, convened in February of that year, ratified Campero as constitutional president for a period of 4 years, accompanied by Aniceto Arce as his vice president. Silva was discontent with the result and decided to stage a mutiny on 12 March of that year. The rebellion was crushed and Campero was able to consolidate his power. The beginning of his government coincided with the virtual dismemberment of the Bolivian forces that were fighting alongside the Peruvians in the War of the Pacific, which motivated Campero to call for a new mobilization effort and personally assume the leadership of the allied troops. The decisive confrontation took place in the Battle of Alto de la Alianza, on 26 May 1880, where the Chilean forces defeated the Bolivian and Peruvian forces, under the command of Campero.

The defeat meant the withdrawal of the Bolivian forces and the definitive loss of the Bolivian Litoral to Chile. The Campero government faced serious difficulties as a result of the war such as the abrupt interruption of foreign trade and the epidemics and famines ravaging the population, aggravated by the military demobilization. In his institutional performance, Campero promulgated a new constitution that inaugurated the cycle of the "oligarchic republic", under the influence of the liberal ideas professed by the new mining elite. Campero tried to govern while complying with the new constitution and the political equidistance between the political groups of Bolivia, divided between liberals, led by Eliodoro Camacho, and conservatives led by Arce. Campero had serious personal and political confrontations with Arce, who served as his vice president and supported the need for an immediate peace with Chile. These clashes led to Arce's exile until the end of Campero's term in 1884.

=== After his presidency ===
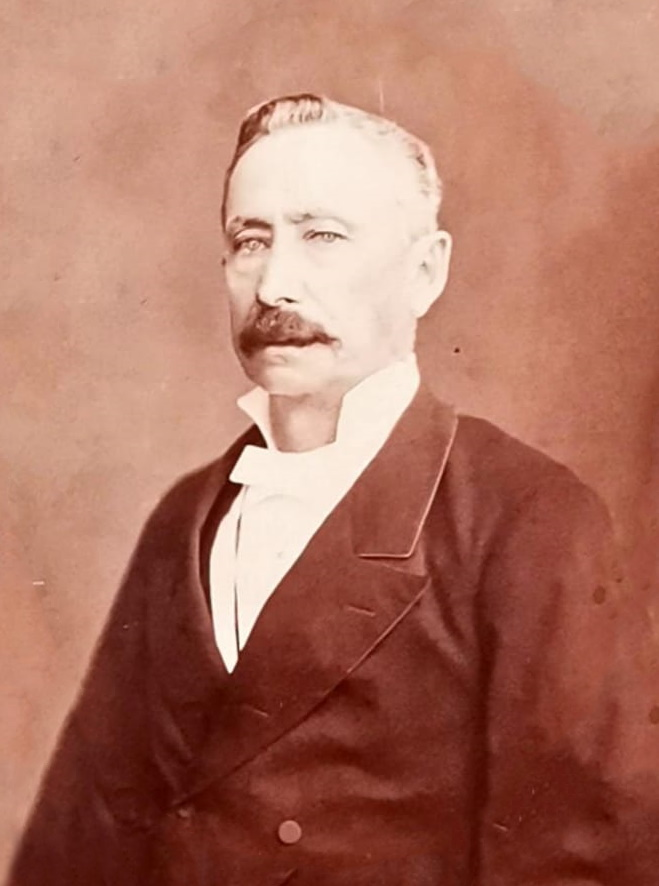
Gregorio Pacheco, first cousin to Campero, President of Bolivia.

He was succeeded by his first cousin, Gregorio Pacheco Leyes, an opposition candidate. A bitter dispute between the two occurred for commercial reasons shortly after Campero handed over power. Campero had demanded that Pacheco deliver the dividends produced by the Guadalupe mine that both had owned in a commercial partnership. This event was followed by the country's press due to the political consequences that this dispute implied for the Pacheco government. Two currents of thought were formed: one in favor of Campero and the other of Pacheco. The confrontation led to a judicial ruling which forced Campero to remain detained in his hacienda for a short time, with the courts later ruling in favor of Pacheco.

== Death and legacy ==
After these events, Campero retired into private life and died in Sucre on 11 December 1896. His wife would die two years later. A proponent of rearmament and reinsertion into the war against Chile with an eye to recovering the lost territories, Campero was opposed in this endeavor by his vice-president, the Conservative Arce. Arce was linked to Chilean monetary and financial interests and favored an "accommodation" with Santiago, essentially advocating the surrender of the Litoral in exchange for investment and perhaps a promise to obtain a port through previously Peruvian but now Chilean-occupied at Arica. Campero soon accused Arce of treason and exiled him precisely to Chile.

Although as president Campero tried to rule in an apolitical manner, he gravitated increasingly toward the Liberal party of Eliodoro Camacho, joining it after he left office in 1884. He is best remembered as the founder of the most stable era of Bolivian politics, with regular elections and rare and brief coups. The status quo he helped create would last until the 1930s, although within the framework of a plutocratic and severely restricted version of democracy, in which only white or mestizo propertied elites could vote.

Political offices
Vacant Casimiro Corral as Minister General Title last held by Gonzalo Lanza	Minister of War; 1871	Succeeded by Ildefonso Sanjinés
Vacant Title last held by Hilarión Daza; Provisional	President of Bolivia; 1880–1884	Succeeded by Gregorio Pacheco
