= Lindaura Anzoátegui Campero =

Bolivian poet and writer (1846–1898)

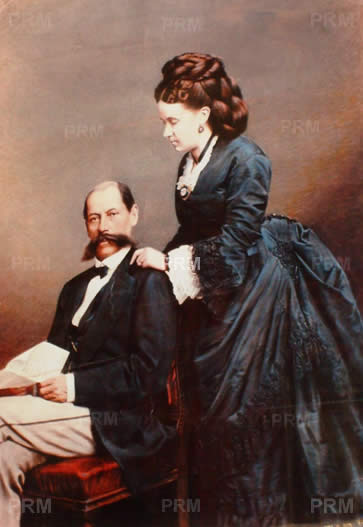
The writer Lindaura Anzoatégui Campero of Campero behind her husband, Narciso Campero Leyes, president of Bolivia.

Linadaura Anzoátegui Campero (31 March 1846, in Tojo – 25 June 1898, in Sucre) was a Bolivian poet and writer. She was the first lady of her country between 1880 and 1884.

== Biography ==
Anzoátegui-Campero was born in a finca near the villa of Tojo, pertaining to the marquesado of the Valley of Tojo, in the current department of Tarija. She was the daughter of Miguel Anzoátegui-Pacheco de Melo and María Calixta Campero Barragán, and granddaughter of the Marquis of Yavi (or of the Valley of Tojo), Juan José Feliciano Fernández Campero y Pérez de Uriondo Martiarena, who died in 1820 as a prisoner of the Spanish realist forces in Kingston (island of Jamaica), for rebelling against the Spanish Crown, following the Surprise of Yavi in 1816.

Lindaura Anzoátegui Campero was orphaned at age 16 and sent to live with her sister Adelaida and Adelaida's husband Pedro José Zilvetti in Sucre. During her time there, she developed her intellectual interests thanks to the rich social life afforded by her noble origins and position.

In 1872, she met her future husband, general Narciso Campero Leyes, then Minister of War of the Bolivian Government, and they were married on June 24 of that year. Despite their difference in age, Lindaura Anzoátegui Campero had discovered a great intellectual and artistic affinity with her husband. In July 1872, Narciso Campero renounced his charge as minister of War and was appointed plenipotentiary minister of Bolivia for France, Great Britain, and Italy. These diplomatic travels gave Lindaura the opportunity to learn about the latest European trends in literature, and led her to start a literary career herself.

Upon their return to Bolivia, the couple withdrew to private life in Sucre, until the beginning of the War of the Pacific (1879) between Bolivia, Chile, and Peru. Narciso Campero offered his military services to president Hilarión Daza, who entrusted him with the training of the famous Fifth Division, with men of the southern departments of Bolivia. On this occasion, Anzoátegui Campero wrote one of her best-known poems, "Bolivia," dedicated to her husband, head of the Bolivian forces. She also published patriotic poems in Potosí and Sucre newspapers.

Later events during the war led to the fall of Hilarión Daza, the defeat of Bolivia, and the rise of Narciso Campero to the presidency (1880–1884). Lindaura, then, became Bolivia's First Lady, while she continued with her writing.

== Literary work ==
Lindaura Anzoátegui Campero wrote short and long stories, poems, and historical novels. She wrote several novels about country traditions: Cómo se vive en mi pueblo, La mujer nerviosa, and Cuidado con los celos, but she is better known for her historical novels Huallparrimachi, Manuel Ascensio Padilla and El año 1815, which involve characters from the Bolivian War of Independence: General Gregorio Aráoz of Lamadrid, the poet Juan Wallparrimachi, and Juana Azurduy of Padilla, the heroine of the War of the Republiquetas, all of them presented from a romantic literary perspective, following the trends of the second half of the 19th century.

Her literary production was presented to the public under the pseudonyms of "El Novel" and "Las Tres Estrellas." Anzoátegui Campero was also praised for her poetry. Along with another famous female Bolivian writer from the period, Adela Zamudio, she led a new era of recognition for Bolivian women in literature, following the steps of the Argentinian-Bolivian writer Juana Manuela Gorriti.

After the presidency years, Narciso Campero and Lindaura Anzoátegui Campero retired once again to private life in Sucre. Narciso Campero died in 1896. His wife followed him on June 25, 1898.
