= Foreign Minister of Bolivia =

Bolivian cabinet position

- Ministro de Relaciones Exteriores de Bolivia
- Coat of arms of Bolivia
- Incumbent; Fernando Aramayo since 9 November 2025
- Ministry of Foreign Affairs
- Nominator: President of Bolivia
- First holder: Facundo Jacinto Infante

The Foreign Minister of Bolivia (Spanish: Ministro de Relaciones Exteriores; informally Canciller) is the head of the Ministry of Foreign Affairs. The current minister is Fernando Aramayo since 9 November 2025.

== List of ministers ==
This is a list of foreign ministers of Bolivia:

- 1826–1828: Facundo Jacinto Infante
- 1828: José Joaquín Casimiro Olañeta Guemes
- 1828: José Severo Feliciano Malavia
- 1829: Mariano del Callejo
- 1829: José María de Lara
- 1829–1831: Mariano Enrique Calvo
- 1831: Manuel José de Asin Franco
- 1832–1833: José Joaquín Casimiro Olañeta Guemes
- 1833–1835: Mariano Enrique Calvo
- 1835–1837: José Ignacio Sanjinés
- 1837–1838: Andrés María Torrico Camacho
- 1838–1839: José Joaquín Casimiro Olañeta Guemes
- 1839: Manuel María Urcullu
- 1839–1841: José María Linares
- 1841: José María Calvimontes
- 1841–1842: Manuel María Urcullu
- 1842–1844: Manuel de la Cruz Méndez
- 1844–1847: Tomás Frías Ametller
- 1847–1848: Domingo Delgadillo
- 1848: José Joaquín Casimiro Olañeta Guemes
- 1848–1849: Juan Ramón Muñoz y Cabrera
- 1849: Lucas Mendoza de la Tapia
- 1849: Manuel José de Asin Franco
- 1849–1851: Tomas Baldivieso
- 1851–1852: Juan Crisóstomo Unzueta
- 1852–1854: Mariano Rafael Bustillo Montesinos
- 1854–1857: Juan de la Cruz Benavente
- 1857–1861: Lucas Mendoza de la Tapia
- 1861: Ricardo José Bustamante
- 1861: Mariano Rafael Bustillo Montesinos
- 1861–1862: Manuel Macedonio Salinas
- 1862: Lucas Mendoza de la Tapia
- 1862–1863: Juan de la Cruz Benavente
- 1863–1864: Mariano Rafael Bustillo Montesinos
- 1864–1871: Mariano Donato Muñoz
- 1871–1873: Casimiro Corral
- 1873: Melchor Terrazas Virreira
- 1873–1876: Mariano Baptista
- 1876–1877: Jorge Oblitas
- 1877–1878: José Manuel del Carpio
- 1878: Luciano Valle
- 1878–1879: Martín Lanza Saravia
- 1879: Serapio Reyes Ortiz
- 1880: Juan Crisóstomo Carrillo
- 1880–1881: Belisario Boeto
- 1881: Daniel Nuñez del Prado
- 1881–1882: Pedro José Zilveti
- 1882–1884: Antonio Quijarro Quevedo
- 1884: Pedro Hermenegildo Vargas
- 1884: Nataniel Aguirre Gonzales
- 1884–1885: Jorge Oblitas
- 1885: Macedonio Doria Medina
- 1885: Heriberto Gutiérrez
- 1885–1887: Juan Crisóstomo Carrillo
- 1887–1888: Juan Francisco Velarde
- 1888–1891: Mariano Baptista
- 1891: Serapio Reyes Ortiz
- 1891–1892: José Manuel del Carpio
- 1892: Severo Fernández
- 1892–1896: Emeterio Cano y Benavente
- 1896–1899: Manuel María Gómez
- 1899–1900: Fernando Eloy Guachalla
- 1900: Eliodoro Villazón
- 1900: Demetrio Calvimonte
- 1900–1902: Federico Díez de Medina
- 1902–1903: Eliodoro Villazón
- 1903–1908: Claudio Pinilla
- 1908–1909: Benedicto Gómez Goytia y Rodo
- 1909–1910: Daniel Sánchez Bustamante Vásquez
- 1910–1911: José María Escalier
- 1911: Juan Misael Saracho
- 1911–1912: Claudio Pinilla
- 1912–1913: Juan Misael Saracho
- 1913: Alfredo Ascarrunz Peláez
- 1913–1914: José Cupertino Arteaga
- 1914–1915: Juan Misael Saracho
- 1915: Plácido Sánchez
- 1915–1916: Víctor Enrique Sanjinés Eguino
- 1916–1917: Plácido Sánchez
- 1917: Julio Zamora
- 1917: Ricardo Mujía Linares
- 1917–1919: Alberto Gutiérrez
- 1919: Darío Gutiérrez
- 1919–1920: Carlos Gutiérrez
- 1920–1921: José María Escalier
- 1921: Francisco Iraizos
- 1921–1922: Alberto Gutiérrez
- 1922: Ricardo Jaimes Freyre
- 1922: Abdón Saavedra
- 1922: Severo Fernández
- 1922–1923: David Alvéstegui Laredo
- 1923: Eduardo Díez de Medina
- 1923–1925: Román Paz
- 1925–1926: Eduardo Díez de Medina
- 1926–1927: Alberto Gutiérrez
- 1927–1928: Tomás Manuel Elío Bustillos
- 1928: Abel Iturralde Palacios
- 1928–1929: Tomás Manuel Elío Bustillos
- 1929: Francisco Iraizos
- 1929–1930: Fabian Vaca Chávez
- 1930: Rafael Torrico Lemoine
- 1930: Alberto Diez de Medina Lertora
- 1930–1931: Filiberto R. Osorio Téllez
- 1931: Daniel Sánchez Bustamante Vásquez
- 1931: Pascual Bailón Mercado
- 1931–1932: Julio A. Gutiérrez
- 1932: Juan María Zalles Calderón
- 1932: Julio A. Gutiérrez
- 1932–1933: Franz Tamayo
- 1933: Demetrio Canelas
- 1933–1934: Carlos Calvo Calbimontes
- 1934–1935: David Alvéstegui Laredo
- 1935: Carlos Víctor Aramayo
- 1935: Tomás Manuel Elío Bustillos
- 1935: Manuel Carrasco Jiménez
- 1935–1936: José María Gutiérrez Lea Plaza
- 1936: Tomás Manuel Elío Bustillos
- 1936: Luis Fernando Guachalla Solares
- 1936: Enrique Baldivieso
- 1936: Óscar Moscoso Gutiérrez
- 1936–1937: Enrique Finot
- 1937: Enrique Baldivieso
- 1937–1939: Eduardo Díez de Medina
- 1939–1941: Alberto Ostria Gutiérrez
- 1941–1942: Eduardo Anze Matienzo
- 1942–1943: Tomás Manuel Elío Bustillos
- 1943: Carlos Salinas Aramayo
- 1943–1944: José Tamayo Solares
- 1944: Enrique Baldivieso
- 1944: Víctor Andrade Uzquiano
- 1944–1945: Gustavo Chacón
- 1945–1946: José Celestino Pinto López
- 1946: Jorge Calero
- 1946: Aniceto Solares Llano
- 1946: Eduardo Sáenz García
- 1946–1947: Aniceto Solares Llano
- 1947: Mamerto Urriolagoitía
- 1947: Luis Fernando Guachalla Solares
- 1947–1948: Tomás Manuel Elío Bustillos
- 1948: Adolfo Costa du Rels
- 1948–1949: Javier Paz Campero
- 1949: Juan Manuel Balcázar
- 1949: Luis Fernando Guachalla Solares
- 1949: Waldo Belmonte Pool
- 1949–1950: Alberto Saavedra Nogales
- 1950–1951: Pedro Zilveti Arce
- 1951–1952: Tomás Antonio Suárez Castedo
- 1952–1956: Wálter Guevara
- 1956–1958: Manuel Barraú Peláez
- 1958–1959: Víctor Andrade Uzquiano
- 1959–1960: Wálter Guevara
- 1960: Carlos Morales Guillén
- 1960–1962: Eduardo Arze Quiroga
- 1962–1964: José Fellmann Velarde
- 1964: Fernando Iturralde Chinel
- 1964–1966: Joaquín Zenteno Anaya
- 1966–1967: Alberto Crespo Gutiérrez
- 1967–1968: Wálter Guevara
- 1968: Samuel Alcoreza Meneses
- 1968–1969: Víctor Hoz de Vila Bacarreza
- 1969: Gustavo Medeiros Querejazú
- 1969–1970: César Ruiz Velarde
- 1970: Edgar Camacho Omiste
- 1970–1971: Emilio Molina Pizarro
- 1971: Huáscar Taborga Torrico
- 1971–1973: Mario R. Gutiérrez Gutiérrez
- 1973–1976: Alberto Guzmán Soriano
- 1976–1978: Óscar Adriázola Valda
- 1978: Ricardo Anaya Arze
- 1978–1979: Raúl Botelho Gosálvez
- 1979: Jorge Escobari Cusicanqui
- 1979: Gustavo Fernández Saavedra
- 1979: Guillermo Bedregal Gutiérrez
- 1979–1980: Julio Garrett Ayllón
- 1980: Gastón Araoz Levy
- 1980–1981: Javier Cerruto Calderón de la Barca
- 1981: Mario Rolón Anaya
- 1981–1982: Gonzalo Romero Álvarez García
- 1982: Agustín Saavedra Weise
- 1982–1983: Mario Velarde Dorado
- 1983: Marcial Tamayo Sáenz
- 1983–1984: José Ortiz Mercado
- 1984–1985: Gustavo Fernández Saavedra
- 1985: Edgar Camacho Omiste
- 1985: Antonio Sánchez (acting)
- 1985–1986: Gastón Araoz Levy
- 1986–1989: Guillermo Bedregal Gutiérrez
- 1989: Valentín Abecia Baldivieso
- 1989–1992: Carlos Iturralde Ballivián
- 1992–1993: Ronald MacLean Abaroa
- 1993: Roberto Peña Rodríguez
- 1993–1997: Antonio Araníbar Quiroga
- 1997–2001: Javier Murillo de la Rocha
- 2001–2002: Gustavo Fernández Saavedra
- 2002–2003: Carlos Saavedra Bruno
- 2003–2005: Juan Ignacio Siles
- 2005–2006: Armando Loaiza
- 2006–2017: David Choquehuanca
- 2017–2018: Fernando Huanacuni Mamani
- 2018–2019: Diego Pary Rodríguez
- 2019–2020: Karen Longaric
- 2020–2023: Rogelio Mayta
- 2023–2025: Celinda Sosa Lunda
- 2025 - : Fernando Hugo Aramayo Carrasco
