= Gregorio Pacheco =

21st President of Bolivia

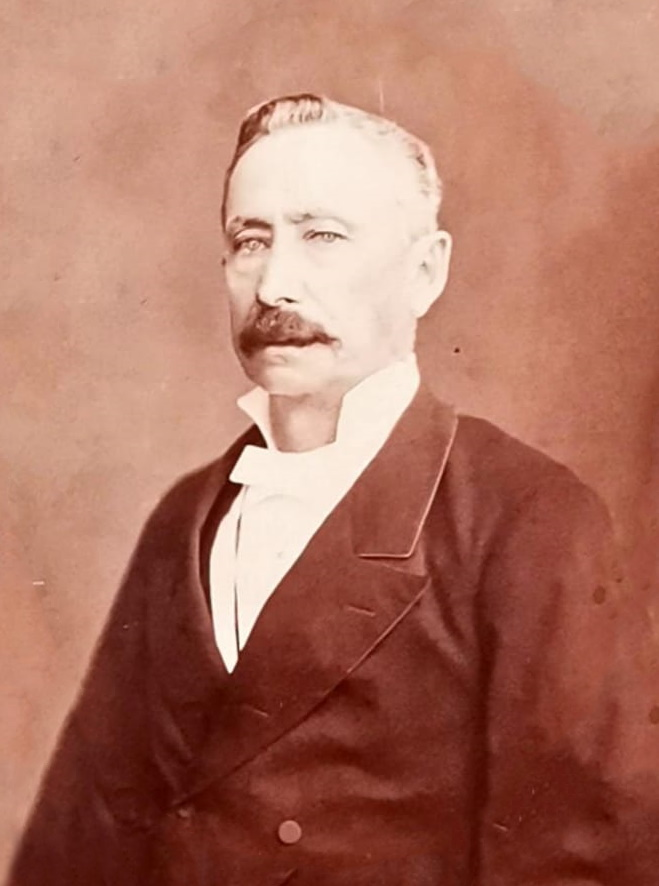

21st President of Bolivia
- In office 4 September 1884 – 15 August 1888
- Vice President: Mariano Baptista; Jorge Oblitas
- Preceded by: Narciso Campero
- Succeeded by: Aniceto Arce

Personal details
- Born: Gregorio Pacheco Leyes; 4 July 1823 Livi Livi, United Provinces of the Río de la Plata (now Bolivia)
- Died: 20 August 1899 (aged 76) Potosí, Bolivia
- Party: Democratic Party; Conservative Party
- Spouse: Corina Aparicio
- Parent(s): Brígido Jose Pacheco; Josefa Leyes
- Relatives: Narciso Campero (cousin)
- Education: University of Saint Francis Xavier

Gregorio Pacheco Leyes (4 July 1823 – 20 August 1899) was a Bolivian businessman and entrepreneur who served as the 21st president of Bolivia from 1884 to 1888. Pacheco won a disputed election that was a virtual three-way tie between him, Conservative leader Aniceto Arce, and Liberal leader Eliodoro Camacho. Pacheco had earned a fortune in the silver mining industry and was one of the country's foremost philanthropists.

== Early life ==
=== Beginnings ===
Pacheco was born in Livi Livi, son of José Brígido Pacheco and Josefa Leyes. He studied at the Universidad Mayor, Real y Pontificia de San Francisco Xavier de Chuquisaca but did not finish his higher studies, since from a very young age he dedicated himself to mining activity in which he made a rapid and vast fortune. This allowed him to travel to Europe, where he acquired some culture and a lot of experience. He was a first cousin of Narciso Campero.

== Electoral victory and presidency ==
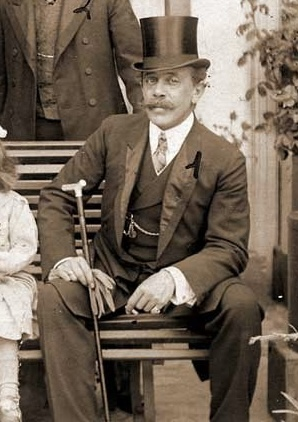
Atanasio de Urioste Velasco, one of Pacheco's most important political allies.

At a young age he became interested in politics and became the main leader of the Democratic Party of Bolivia. In 1884, he won a tight general election, defeating Aniceto Arce, of the Conservative Party, and Eliodoro Camacho, of the Liberal Party. Pacheco was accused by the other candidates of bribery since he was, after all, the richest man in Bolivia. While electoral frauds have been common in Bolivian history, it is uncertain whether Pacheco did so.

It was now up to Pacheco to guide his nation to the path of peace and order, since it was only four years prior that the War of the Pacific, in which Bolivia lost its coastal provinces, devastated the country. In 1884, he negotiated a truce agreement with this nation; the final peace treaty would not be signed until 1904. In 1886, he negotiated a boundary treaty with Peru.

Pacheco was a magnanimous president, he built the Sucre Psychiatric Institute at his own expense and several other social institutions to aid the lower classes of Bolivia. In order to incorporate distant territories into the national sphere, he founded Puerto Pacheco on 13 July 1885, located on the right bank of the Paraguay River. During his presidency, the first international telegraphic service from La Paz to Lima was inaugurated and the Banco Hipotecario was opened in Sucre. He was a promoter of science and technology together with Aniceto Arce and, with their combined efforts, were able to bring electricity to the country.

The young congressman Atanasio de Urioste Velasco was one of Pacheco's staunchest allies and, although a liberal, always ardently defended the revolutionary innovations brought by Pacheco's administration. In fact, Pacheco furthered Urioste's career in hopes of his support in the future. Furthermore, he kept Urioste by his side because the congressman was the brother-in-law of Francisco Argandoña, one of the wealthiest and most important men in Bolivia at the time.

=== Administrative acts ===
Throughout his administration, Pacheco began the industrialization and modernization process in Bolivia. He would be the founder and patron of several social institutions. Other acts include:

- The modernization of the country with the installation of electric light in the city of La Paz and the telegraph, which connected the country with the world through an international line to Lima.
- The foundation of Puerto Pacheco, which later fell to Paraguay.
- The construction of the Psychiatric Center in Sucre that today bears his name.
- The signing of a boundary treaty with Paraguay.
- The exploration of the Chaco by a commission headed by Arthur Thouar and Antonio Tovar.
- The construction of the first steel and cement factories in Bolivia.
- The expansion of silver mines and the first real economic growth Bolivia had seen in the 19th century.

== Later life, philanthropy and personality ==
A unique characteristic of Pacheco was his philanthropy since he partook in many charitable works with his own money, spending his vast wealth he had acquired as silver tycoon. He also paid, with his own money, a debt from the country to Peru, which amounted to the then high sum of 50,000 Bolivian pesos. He had strong support from the military, something that civilian administrations of the past lacked to acquire. This was because, unlike previous civilian presidents, he did not dedicate his internal policy to antagonize or debilitate the Army. He finished his term with the satisfaction of having fulfilled his duty and supporting the electoral campaign of Aniceto Arce in 1888, as he had agreed with the Conservatives at the beginning of his term.

Although conservative by temperament, he was originally not a member of Arce's party, and ran against him, as well as against the Liberals, on the basis of his personal resources and fame as an efficient administrator. Arce, in fact, initially resented Pacheco's intrusion in politics, understanding that no one in the country could match his personal fortune, which would no doubt make him hard to beat.

=== Death ===
Pacheco died in the mining town of Guadalupe, in the Potosí Department, on 20 August 1899. A vast portion of his fortune was donated to charities in Bolivia and the remainder was inherited by his two eldest sons.

== Personal life ==
Pacheco was married to Corina Aparicio, with who he had two sons: Gregorio and Daniel. Fearing reprisals against his family when he was president, he sent them to Europe. His sons would leave Bolivia and move the headquarters of the Pacheco family mining company to London.

Party political offices
| Preceded by New political party | Democratic nominee for President of Bolivia; 1884 | Succeeded by Party dissolved |
Political offices
| Preceded by Narciso Campero | President of Bolivia; 1884–1888 | Succeeded by Aniceto Arce |
