= Uladislao Silva =

Bolivian military officer (1840–1898)

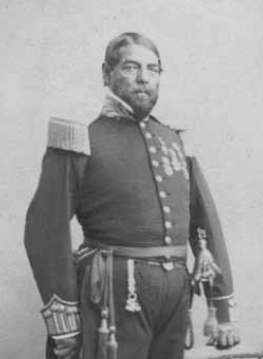

President of the Government Junta of La Paz
- In office 28 December 1879 – 19 January 1880
- Preceded by: Hilarión Daza
- Succeeded by: Narciso Campero

Personal details
- Born: 2 January 1840 La Paz, Bolivia
- Died: 3 October 1898 (aged 49) La Paz, Bolivia
- Spouse: Margarita Portillo (m. 1862)

Military service
- Allegiance: Bolivia
- Branch/service: Bolivian Army
- Rank: Colonel
- Battles/wars: War of the Pacific

Uladislao Silva (2 January 1840 – 3 October 1898) was a Bolivian military officer who led the overthrow of President Hilarión Daza during the War of the Pacific and served as president of the junta of La Paz from 1879 to 1880.

== Early life and family ==
Uladislao Silva was born in La Paz to Pedro Juan Silva and Luisa Arancibia. He joined the Military College of La Paz and rose to the rank of colonel in 1876 after participating in a mutiny in Santa Cruz de la Sierra during the coup that ousted Tomás Frías. He was married to Margarita Portillo on 26 May 1862.

Silva's rise in the military ranks was greatly due to his relationship with Agustín Morales, who served as president between 1871 and 1872. Silva served as aide-de-camp to Morales and was in the president's inner circle, always dining with him.

== La Paz Junta ==
During the War of the Pacific, Silva was in command of the battalion Victoria, which had been given orders to march from La Paz to Tacna. However, Silva instead spearheaded a coup against the absent President Hilarión Daza and successfully ousted him. Silva's coup coincided with Eliodoro Camacho's, essentially leading to the Council of Ministers ruling the country, under the presidency of Serapio Reyes Ortiz, to abdicate and allow this de facto takeover. A Government Junta was set up in La Paz composed of Silva, Donato Vásquez, and Rudecindo Carvajal. On January 4, 1880, Silva assigned Narciso Campero as Commander in Chief of the Bolivian Army.

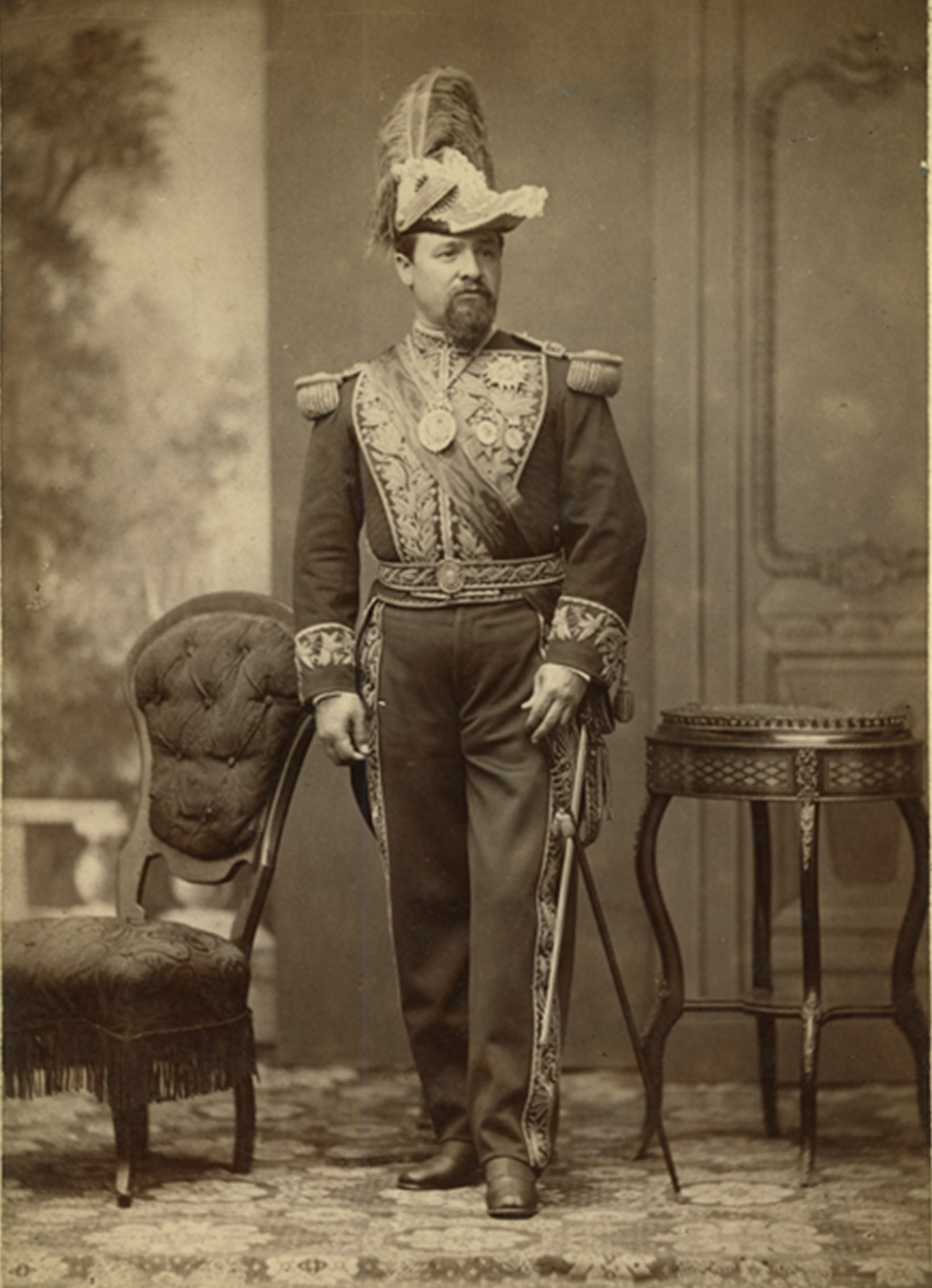
President Hilarión Daza.

After weeks of deliberation, Campero was chosen as provisional president. Silva was outraged by this fact as he believed he had been chosen by the people to lead the country and, thus, he represented the will of the masses. Though Silva objected to Campero's election, no department continued to recognize the junta, forcing him cede power.

=== 12 March mutiny ===
Silva "had the naive illusion that the people of La Paz had anointed him chief of the entire nation and he remained resentful, realizing that he had only been used for an emergency". Campero was aware of Silva's dissatisfaction, and in an attempt to pacify him, the colonel was made inspector general of the Bolivian Army. In this position, Silva mutinied in Viacha and occupied the Plaza Murillo of La Paz on 12 March 1880. However, by 18 March, the mutiny was crushed after the rebels were dispersed in El Alto and several of the leader executed as Silva fled toward Chiclayo. The mutiny is said to have resulted in the deaths of two thousand men.

José Manuel Guachalla, one of Silva's accomplices, justified the mutiny:

This procedure and [Campero's] tenacity in separating from all political participation those who he and his henchmen called corralistas, forced, without a doubt, Colonel Uladislao Silva to the revolution of 12 March 1880. I express myself with the military honesty that I have always accustomed.

In a letter written to Silva on 16 March, four days after the mutiny, Eliodoro Camacho expressed:

... what do we call, colonel, he who promotes internal anarchy at times where your country is engaged in a national war? I have broken my pen a thousand times before writing that word that usually marks a man's forehead. Oh! With the white-hot iron of eternal opprobrium, which I do not want to use as a description of the man I once called 'friend'...

Silva was allowed to return years after the mutiny and faced trial for crimes committed.
