= Valentín Abecia Baldivieso =

Bolivian writer and diplomat (1925–2010)

Valentín Abecia Baldivieso (9 October 1925 – 28 July 2010) was a Bolivian diplomat and writer. He was Minister of Foreign Affairs for a brief period in 1989 and contributed to the process of institutionalization of the Foreign Ministry . He was the author of the three volume bibliographical work The History of Bolivia in International Relations. He was the founder and chairman of the Cultural Foundation of the Central Bank of Bolivia, as well as the president of the Bolivian Academy of History and the Academia Nacional de Ciencias de Bolivia. Abecia also founded the literary group, Gesta Barbara.

He was born in Potosí and was retired for several years before his death in La Paz in 2010.

Abecia Baldivieso studied law at the Higher University of San Andrés and was Senator, Ambassador, president of the Academies of History and Sciences of Bolivia. On his experience with 'Gesta Bárbara', the author wrote in his memoirs: "... many years have passed and no one can erase that flutter of the young, rebellious, iconoclastic and vertical spirit of those who raised wings, especially the poetry that, as always in the new group manifestation, it became a revolution of ideas ..."
