= University of San Francisco Xavier =

Public university in Sucre, Bolivia

Coordinates: 19.0471°S 65.2611°W

Royal and Pontifical Higher University of San Francisco Xavier of Chuquisaca
- Universidad Mayor Real y Pontificia de San Francisco Xavier de Chuquisaca
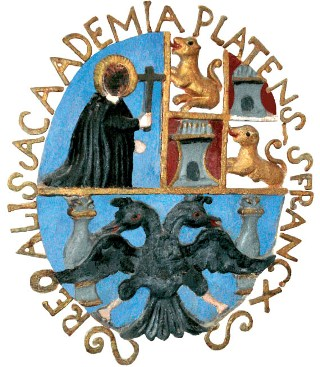
- Type: Public
- Established: March 27, 1624 (402 years ago)
- Founder: Philip IV of Spain
- Rector: Sergio Padilla
- Students: 44,000
- Location: Calle Junín Esq. Estudiantes No. 692, Sucre, Bolivia
- Campus: Urban
- Website: www.usfx.bo
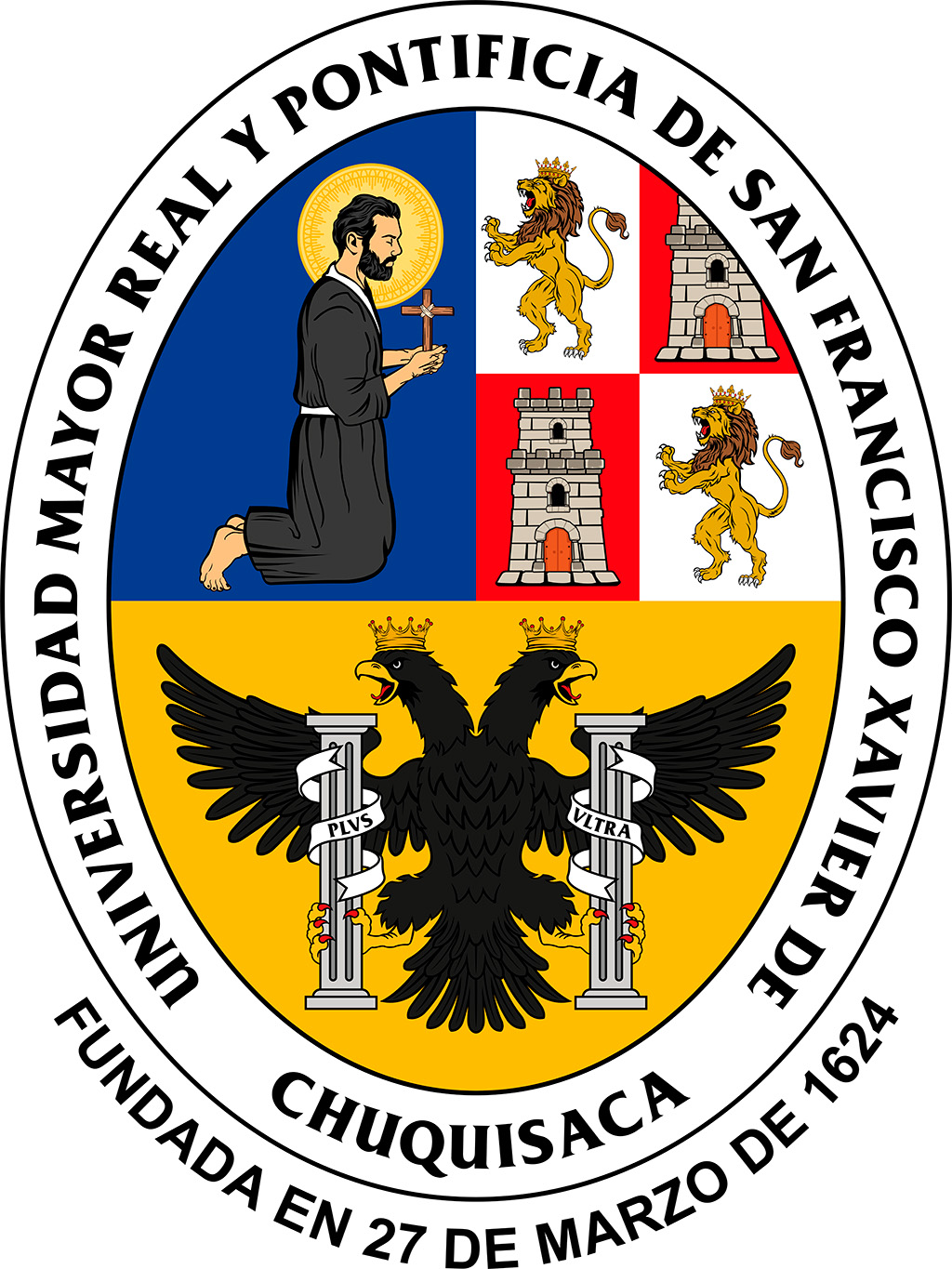

The Royal and Pontifical Higher University of San Francisco Xavier of Chuquisaca (USFX; Spanish: Universidad Mayor Real y Pontificia de San Francisco Xavier de Chuquisaca) is a public university in Sucre, Bolivia. It is one of the oldest universities in the New World. In many historical texts, it is also referred to as the University of Charcas.

Founded in 1624 by order of the Spanish King Philip IV, and with the support of Pope Innocent XII, the university was intended to provide an education in Law and Theology to the families and descendants of the wealthy gentry of South America.

At the turn of the 19th century, Chuquisaca and its university came to constitute a center of revolutionary zeal in Bolivia. The university intellectually sustained the well-cultivated Francophile elite whose ideals led to the Bolivian War of Independence and ultimately to the independence of all the Spanish colonies. Once a Republic was proclaimed by Simón Bolívar, the university became the main university of the new country.

== See also ==
- List of universities in Bolivia
- List of colonial universities in Latin America
- List of Jesuit sites
