= Conservative Party (Bolivia) =

Conservative Party Partido Conservador
- Abbreviation: PC
- Founded: July 1883
- Dissolved: 1899
- Merger of: Constitutional Party; Conservative Party; Democratic Party (1892)
- Ideology: Conservatism; Anti-communism; Political Catholicism; Under Mariano Baptista: Anti-positivism; Anti-socialism; British capitalism Under Aniceto Arce: Capitalism; Linaresism
- Political position: Right-wing

The Conservative Party (Spanish: Partido Conservador) was one of two major political parties in Bolivia in the late 19th century. The other was the Liberal Party. Between 1884 and 1899, all of the Presidents of Bolivia were members of the Conservative Party. The Conservative rule of Bolivia started with the presidency of Narciso Campero. One of the Conservative party's main goals was to develop an international rail network. The Conservative party lost control to the liberal party in the Federalist War of 1899.

== Establishment and rise ==
The Conservative Party was founded in 1880 with strong backing from the silver mining oligarchy. Initially, the party faced little opposition and quickly rose to power by promising the mining elite the construction of an international rail network to support their economic interests.

== Federalist War ==
In 1899, tensions between the Conservative and Liberal parties escalated into the Federalist War, a conflict centered on the location of Bolivia's capital. The Conservatives supported Sucre, while the Liberals advocated for La Paz. The Conservatives were backed by the political elite and Chile, whereas the Liberals gained support from the general public, tin mining interests, indigenous communities, and Peru. Led by José Manuel Pando, the Liberals allied with indigenous leader Pablo Zárate Willka and the Aymara people. Together, they defeated the Conservative forces near La Paz, marking the end of Conservative dominance.

== Rule ==
During their time in power, the Conservatives made progress on their promise to build an international rail network. The railroads primarily connected Bolivia's silver mines to Chilean ports, facilitating mineral exports. However, these projects were largely designed to benefit the mining elite and did little to promote broader economic development. Their focus on appeasing special interest groups ultimately limited the long-term impact of their infrastructure initiatives.

== See also ==
- History of Bolivia (1809–1920)
