= Adelio Paucara =

Bolivian politician (born 1965)

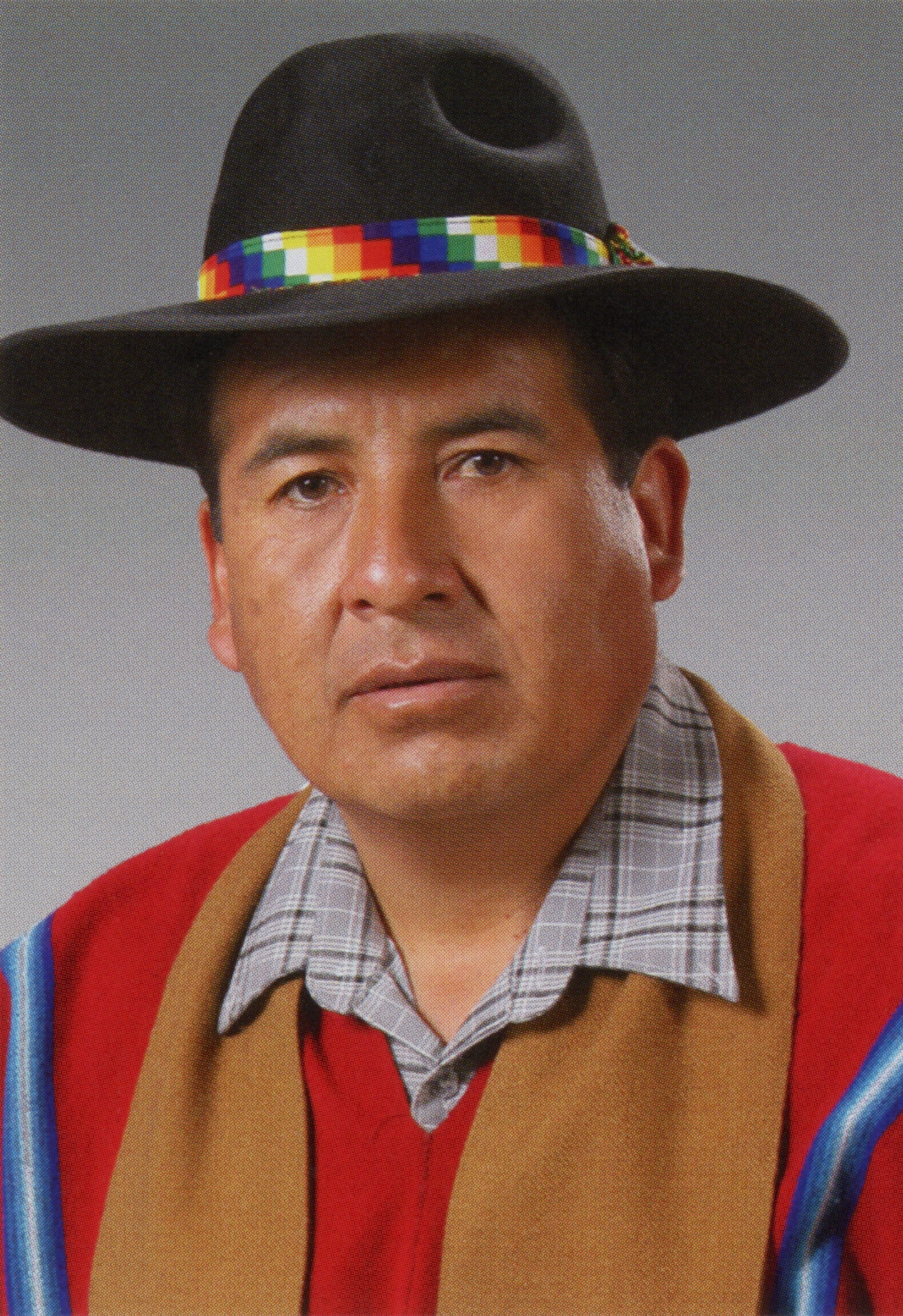
- Official portrait, 2014

Member of the Chamber of Deputies from La Paz's 18th constituency
- In office 19 January 2010 – 18 January 2015
- Substitute: Pastora Jové
- Preceded by: Leandro Chacalluca
- Succeeded by: Julio Huaraya (Note: Redistribution, constituency 15.)
- Constituency: Muñecas; Omasuyos; Saavedra

Personal details
- Born: Javier Adelio Paucara Llojlla; 16 June 1965 (age 61) Omasuyos, La Paz, Bolivia
- Party: Movement Toward Socialism
- Education: Warisata Normal School
- Occupation: Educator; politician; trade unionist

Javier Adelio Paucara Llojlla (Note: In this Spanish name, the first or paternal surname is Paucara and the second or maternal family name is Llojlla.) (born 16 June 1965) is a Bolivian educator, politician, and trade unionist who represented La Paz's 18th constituency in the Chamber of Deputies from 2010 to 2015.

Paucara was born in a rural community and graduated as a teacher from the Warisata Normal School. He taught in Inquisivi and Omasuyos provinces and held leadership positions in the local peasant and teachers' unions of Achacachi. He was also a member of the Red Ponchos, the radical Aymara force that gained prominence during the Bolivian gas conflict and for its support of the Movement Toward Socialism.

In 2009, Paucara ran for parliament representing Muñecas, Omasuyos, and Saavedra provinces. Despite disputes over his nomination, he won by a landslide, receiving one of the highest vote shares in any single-member constituency that election. In office, Paucara proved unpopular among sectors of the Red Ponchos, and he did not stand for reelection.

== Early life and career ==
=== Early life and education ===
Adelio Paucara was born on 16 June 1965 in Omasuyos Province, in a rural community that lacked access to electricity. The son of Ángel Paucara Mamani and Julia Llojlla, he belongs to the Aymara people, an indigenous group who constitute a significant majority of the province's population.

Paucara studied in his hometown until the fourth grade before attending school in Achacachi, the provincial capital, where he earned his baccalaureate. He later completed his mandatory military service in the Bolivian Air Force, serving in El Alto. Following his discharge, Paucara enrolled at the Warisata Normal School. He graduated as a mathematics teacher in 1988 and taught at rural schools in the provinces of Inquisivi and Omasuyos.

=== Trade unionism and peasant leadership ===
In Omasuyos, Paucara became involved in organized labor, being part of local peasant and teachers' unions. He held leadership roles in the Túpac Katari Peasant Workers' Federation and served as executive secretary of Achacachi's rural teachers' union in 2003.

Paucara was a member of the Red Ponchos, a radical Aymara force that gained notoriety in 2003, during the Bolivian gas conflict. Amid the unrest, Paucara took part in roadblocks in Warisata protesting the government's natural resource policies. The military's confrontation with those demonstrators culminated in the Warisata massacre, the catalyst for Black October, which toppled the then-administration.

Throughout the following years, Paucara remained active as a peasant leader in his community. He served as justice secretary in the town of Tola Tola in 2005, was a member of the Achacachi cantonal executive committee in 2009, and was also involved in CONAMAQ, which promoted traditional forms of governance among highland indigenous communities.

== Chamber of Deputies ==
=== Election ===
From the mid-2000s onward, the Red Ponchos backed Evo Morales's administration, drawn by his reformist agenda and strong assertion of indigenous identity. The Movement Toward Socialism (MAS) built a dominant political machine in the Altiplano thanks to its network of alliances with peasant unions and groups like the Red Ponchos.

Paucara joined the MAS, and in 2009, he became the party's candidate for the Chamber of Deputies in La Paz's 18th constituency, which spanned Muñecas, Omasuyos, and Saavedra provinces. He had been selected at a peasant assembly Achacachi. However, his nomination was disputed by the Red Ponchos of Ancoraimes, who contended that their candidate had been backed by seventeen cantons to Paucara's four. In protest, the rival Red Ponchos installed roadblocks in Huarina, which were only lifted after the mediation of Foreign Minister David Choquehuanca.

Despite discontent around his nomination, Paucara cruised to victory, riding the coattails of Morales's landslide election in the region. In a contest characterized by straight-ticket voting, individual candidate popularity had little impact on the outcome of most legislative races. In fact, Paucara received the highest margin of victory in La Paz Department and one of the highest in Bolivian history: 95.4 percent of valid and 71.9 percent of all ballots cast; the disparity reflected the high proportion of invalid votes. (Note: Eugenio Luna in Cochabamba's 27th constituency received the largest margin in any single-member district that election: 94.4 percent of valid and 78.5 percent of total votes cast. If counting just the proportion of valid votes, Paucara's margin was highest.)

=== Tenure ===
Paucara remained at odds with sectors of the Red Ponchos throughout his term. In 2014, nearly 100 Red Ponchos traveled to Plaza Murillo to demand his resignation. He stood accused of failing to attend meetings, submit reports, and coordinate with local authorities. Paucara refused to resign or meet with the protesters, prompting them to declare roadblocks in Omasuyos Province. However, these were called off, and it was instead decided that sanctions against him would be determined by the particular communities he represented. Paucara was not put up for reelection later that year. Despite these tensions, the Red Ponchos remained loyal to the MAS, and the party maintained its electoral dominance in the region.

=== Commission assignments ===
- Plural Justice, Prosecutor's Office, and Legal Defense of the State Commission
  - Indigenous Native Peasant Jurisdiction Committee (2010–2011)
- Government, Defense, and Armed Forces Commission
  - Defense, Armed Forces, Borders, and Civil Defense Committee (Secretary: 2011–2012)
- Planning, Economic Policy, and Finance Commission
  - Budget, Tax Policy, and Comptroller's Office Committee (2012–2015)

== Electoral history ==
Electoral history of Adelio Paucara
Year	Office		Party	Votes			Result	Ref.
Year	Office		Party	Total	%	P.	Result	Ref.
2009	Deputies	C-18	Movement Toward Socialism	33,068	95.42	1st	Won	
Source: Plurinational Electoral Organ | Electoral Atlas

Chamber of Deputies of Bolivia
Preceded by Leandro Chacalluca	Member of the Chamber of Deputies from La Paz's 18th constituency 2010–2015	Succeeded by Julio Huaraya
