= Martha Poma =

Bolivian politician (born 1964)

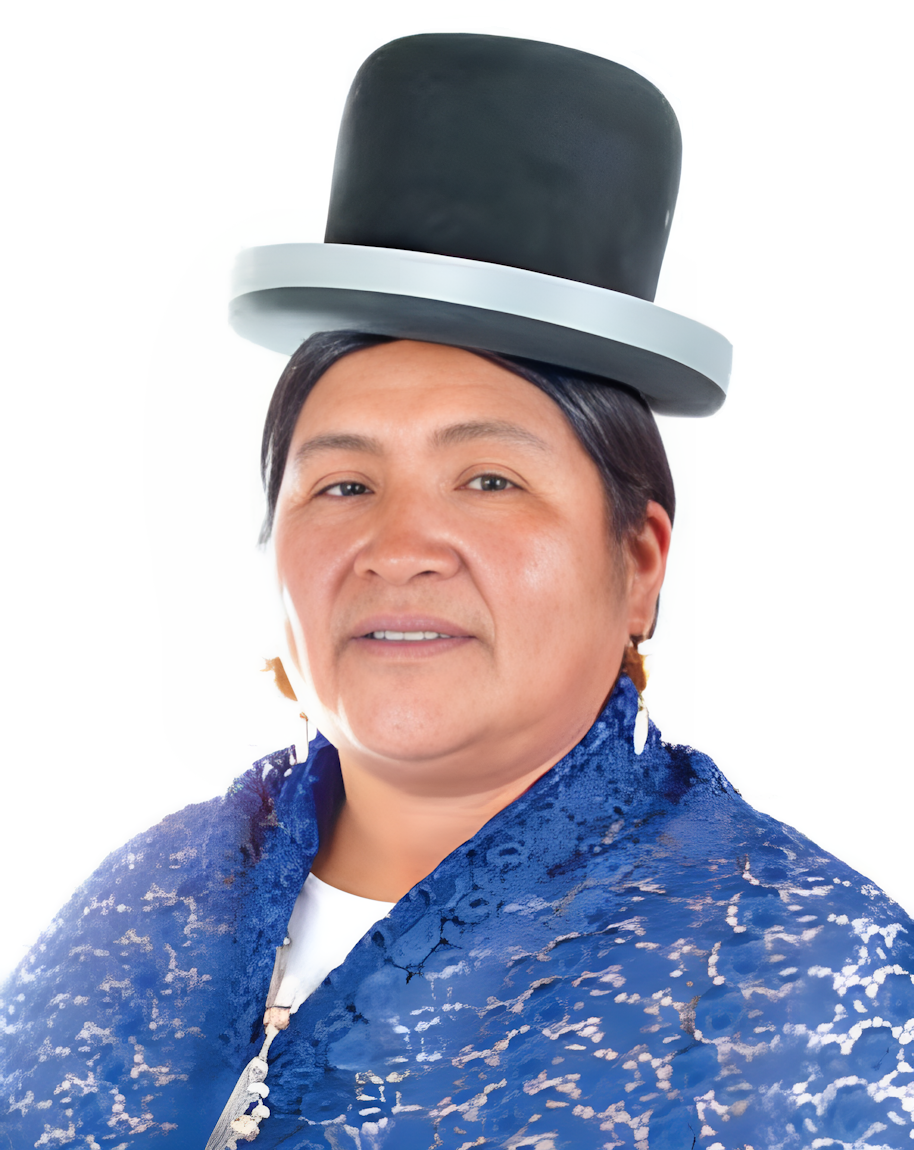
- Official portrait, 2012

Senator for La Paz
- In office 19 January 2010 – 18 January 2015
- Substitute: Víctor Castro
- Preceded by: Luis Vásquez
- Succeeded by: Jorge Choque

Personal details
- Born: Martha Poma Luque; 19 November 1964 (age 61) Chojñapata Chiñaja, La Paz, Bolivia
- Party: Movement for Socialism (2006–present)
- Other political affiliations: Integrative Social Autonomy (2004)
- Occupation: Artisan; politician; trade unionist

Martha Poma Luque (born 19 November 1964) is a Bolivian politician, trade unionist, and textile artisan who served as senator for La Paz from 2010 to 2015.

Born in highland Omasuyos Province, Poma spent her youth between the rural Altiplano and the migrant city of El Alto. A daughter of artisans, she worked in handicrafts, producing traditional indigenous textiles for much of her life. Poma taught women's workshops on weaving and sewing for the Catholic charity Caritas and held leadership positions in artisan organizations, including as general secretary of the Pachamama Artisans' Association. She served as chair of the Central Council of Artisans of El Alto and represented her trade's labor organizations at the Regional Worker Center and the National Confederation of Artisans.

Following an unsuccessful campaign for a seat on the El Alto Municipal Council in 2004, Poma joined the ranks of the ruling Movement for Socialism. She failed in her first bid for Constituent Assembly in 2006 and finally won a seat in the Senate in 2009. Poma was the first indigenous woman to represent La Paz in the Senate and the first to serve on its directorate. As a representative of El Alto's artisan sector, Poma led the push to revive a long-gridlocked artisanry bill and defended her constituency even when their position conflicted with ruling party policy. She was not nominated for reelection.

== Early life and career ==
=== Early life and education ===
Martha Poma was born on 19 November 1964 in Chojñapata Chiñaja, (Note: Poma's exact birthplace is unclear. One source cites Chojñapata, while another names the nearby village of Chiñaja. Both settlements form the namesake of the Chojñapata Chiñaja Canton.) a canton in the Ancoraimes Municipality of western La Paz's highland Omasuyos Province. Poma was the lone daughter in a family of twelve siblings; her parents, both artisans, made their livings in multiple fields: Poma's mother operated a small family-owned restaurant and specialized in embroidery in her off time, while her father made weavings from alpaca fiber during his days away from the mines.

Poma spent her youth between the city and the countryside. Her family practiced agriculture and animal husbandry on the Altiplano; she was taught to work the fields, harvesting traditional Andean crops, primarily maize and potatoes. From age 4, Poma spent regular stints in La Paz's west end (now El Alto), where she attended the Henriette de la Chevalerie School up through her third year of intermediate. She completed the remainder of her studies at adult school, graduating with a baccalaureate from the Center for Accelerated Secondary Education in 2003.

=== Career and trade unionism ===
Like her parents, Poma worked as a textile artisan for a significant part of her life. She labored for over two decades producing traditional indigenous textiles of the region: alpaca fiber garments, macramé, polleras, etc. Her family sold their handicraft on the informal market, the dominant trade channel in El Alto and La Paz's urban periphery. To improve her skill, Poma attended regular training workshops hosted by the Pastoral Social, and she worked directly with the Church-affiliated charity Caritas Bolivia to deliver classes on sewing and weaving. Poma spent eighteen years as a trainer for Caritas's Pachamama Center from 1988 to 2005, providing vocational education to over 1,000 women in El Alto and surrounding provinces. During this time, she served as general secretary of the Pachamama Artisans' Association.

Poma also held local civic positions as chair of her son's school board from 1994 to 2000 and president of her community's neighborhood council for two years afterward. At the same time, she made headwinds in her sector's trade union circuit: she served as executive secretary of the Central Council of Artisans of El Alto from 1992 to 1996 and was a regional executive of the National Confederation of Artisans of Bolivia from 1998 to 2001. As a representative of the city's seventy-four artisan organizations, Poma also held a seat on the directorate of the El Alto Regional Worker Center.

== Chamber of Senators ==
=== Election ===
Poma ran for a seat on the El Alto Municipal Council in 2004 as part of a slate of candidates presented by Integrative Social Autonomy (ASI), a minor political front. The 2004 municipal elections were the first to allow local political organizations to compete, and many groups were formed to contest it; in El Alto, the field was especially crowded. Most smaller contenders saw disappointing showings: Poma – who headlined ASI's list of substitute councillors – was not elected, as ASI won no seats.

Poma ran again for public office in 2006, this time with a more established front: the governing Movement for Socialism (MAS). She was nominated for a party-list seat in the Constituent Assembly, though in a low slot that gave negligible prospects for victory. In effect, the electoral system in place in 2006 made it improbable for any party – no matter how dominant – to win more than two, at most three, party-list constituents. Poma's name was kept in mind for future contests, and in 2009, allied social movement organizations affiliated with the MAS nominated her for a seat in the Senate. On this occasion, she won.

=== Tenure ===
Poma was the first indigenous chola and co-second woman (Note: After Ana María Flores; alongside Ana María Romero, who took office at the same time.) to represent La Paz in the Senate. Following the accession of senator René Martínez to the presidency of the Senate, Poma was voted to replace him as first vice president, making her the first indigenous woman to serve on the upper chamber's governing directorate.

In office, Poma's legislative priorities centered on the needs of her sectoral base: artisans. She was the driving force behind the passage of Bolivia's Artisanry Promotion Law, enacted in 2012 after a near-quarter-century of being stuck in development. The legislation formally incorporated the country's artisan craftsmen – metal, textile, and woodworkers, tailors, even painters and photographers, etc. – into the organized economy, allowing for greater ease of doing business and providing tradesmen state-allocated funds for vocational training, business, and sales support.

On occasion, Poma's sectoral loyalties transcended partisan affiliation. In one notable instance, Poma was the lone ruling party senator to oppose a bill providing limited amnesty for drivers of unregistered vehicles. She argued that it would incentivize peddlers of contraband second-hand clothes to seek their own pardon, to the detriment of legitimate clothiers.

In keeping with the MAS's general practice of rotating out its incumbent representatives in favor of new cadres, Poma was not nominated for reelection in 2014, concluding her legislative service after just one term. She was briefly placed in contention for the El Alto mayoralty when the party was analyzing running a woman in the 2015 election. Former minister Mabel Monje won out there before it was ultimately decided to re-nominate incumbent Edgar Patana, who went on to lose reelection.

=== Commission assignments ===
- Chamber of Senators Directorate (First Vice President: 2010–2012)
- State Security, Armed Forces, and Bolivian Police Commission
  - Armed Forces and Bolivian Police Committee (Secretary: 2013–2014)
  - State Security and Fight Against Drug Trafficking (Secretary: 2010)
- Plural Economy, Production, Industry, and Industrialization Commission (President: 2012–2013, 2014–2015)
  - Plural Economy, Productive Development, Public Works, and Infrastructure Committee (Secretary: 2010)

== Electoral history ==
Electoral history of Martha Poma
Year	Office	Party	Votes			Result	Ref.
Year	Office	Party	Total	%	P.	Result	Ref.
2004	Councillor	Integrative Social Autonomy	2,929	1.09%	6th	Lost	(Note: Presented on an electoral list. The data shown represents the share of the vote the entire party/alliance received in that constituency.)
2006	Constituent	Movement for Socialism	558,886	63.82%	1st	Lost	
2009	Senator	Movement for Socialism	1,099,259	80.28%	1st	Won	
Source: Plurinational Electoral Organ | Electoral Atlas

Senate of Bolivia
Preceded by Luis Vásquez	Senator for La Paz; 2010–2015; Served alongside: Ana María Romero, Eugenio Rojas, Fidel Surco	Succeeded by Jorge Choque
Preceded by René Martínez	First Vice President of the Senate; 2010–2012	Succeeded by Andrés Villca
