= Q'ara Qullu (disambiguation) =

Q'ara Qullu (Aymara q'ara bare, bald, qullu mountain, "bare mountain", also spelled Cara Kkollu, Caracollo, Khara Khollu, Khara Kkollu) may refer to:

- Caracollo, a town in Bolivia
- Q'ara Qullu, a mountain in the Achacachi Municipality, Omasuyos Province, La Paz Department, Bolivia
- Q'ara Qullu (Ancoraimes), a mountain in the Achacachi Municipality, Omasuyos Province, La Paz Department, Bolivia
- Q'ara Qullu (Loayza), a mountain the Loayza Province, La Paz Department, Bolivia
- Q'ara Qullu (Sajama), a mountain the Sajama Province, Oruro Department, Bolivia
