= Roberto Rojas (politician) =

Bolivian politician (1966–2022)

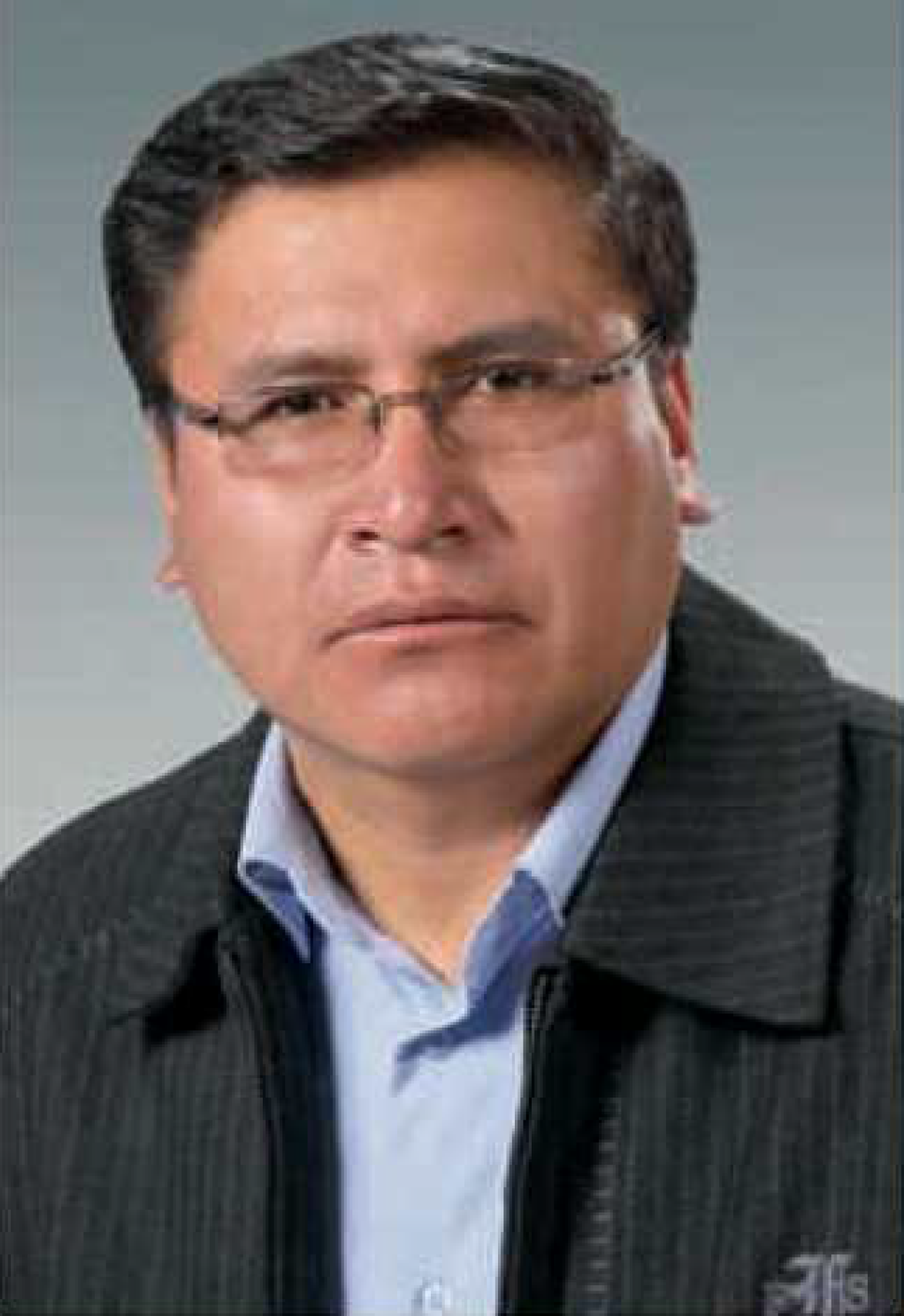
- Official portrait, 2014

Member of the Chamber of Deputies from La Paz circumscription 15
- In office 19 January 2010 – 18 January 2015
- Substitute: Enriqueta Villarroel
- Preceded by: Tony Condori
- Succeeded by: Sergio Choque (Note: Redistribution; circumscription 12.)
- Constituency: El Alto

Personal details
- Born: Roberto Rojas Herrera; 25 November 1966 Warisata, La Paz, Bolivia
- Died: 17 October 2022 (aged 55) El Alto, Bolivia
- Party: Movement for Socialism
- Education: Public University of El Alto
- Occupation: Accountant; politician; trade unionist

Roberto Rojas Herrera (25 November 1966 – 17 October 2022) was a Bolivian accountant, politician, and trade unionist who served as a member of the Chamber of Deputies from La Paz, representing circumscription 15 from 2010 to 2015. A member of the Movement for Socialism, Rojas entered political activity as a member of El Alto's neighborhood councils, serving as secretary of sports for the city's San Pablo Zone before presiding over the District 3 council from 2000 to 2009. One rung above, he served as secretary of organization of the Federation of Neighborhood Councils from 2008 to 2010. The organization's alliance with the Movement for Socialism facilitated Rojas' entry into the Chamber of Deputies. Following his tenure in the legislature, he returned to El Alto, briefly serving as regional manager of the state-owned water and sanitation company before finally retiring from public life.

== Early life and career ==
An ethnic Aymara, Roberto Rojas was born on 25 November 1966 in Warisata, a minor hamlet situated in western La Paz's Omasuyos Province. Raised in rural poverty to a merchant mother and a farmer father, Rojas attended the Elizardo Pérez School, where he graduated in 1984. The following year, he moved to El Alto in search of better economic opportunity, a common destination among the department's rural inhabitants, whose exodus from the Altiplano in the latter decades of the twentieth century exponentially increased the city's demographic growth. Rojas worked for some time as a police officer while continuing his studies at various universities in La Paz, finally graduating as a general accountant with a diploma in governance. Later, he studied to become an auditor at the Public University of El Alto but could not afford to finish the degree, switching his major to law sometime thereafter.

Around this time, Rojas became active in local community leadership, joining his district's neighborhood council. He got his start as secretary of sports for El Alto's San Pablo Zone before later presiding over the city's District 3 Neighborhood Council from 2000 to 2009. He served as secretary of organization of the Federation of Neighborhood Councils from 2008 to 2010 and was a member of the body's citizen security commission. The neighborhood councils served as organizations of particular import in El Alto, taking charge of negotiating with public officials for the provision of basic services—electricity, water, and so on—and organizing community events. In that sense, they constituted one of the main spaces in the city for figures like Rojas to gain political notoriety. To that end, the sector's solid alliance with the nascent Movement for Socialism (MAS-IPSP) allowed many prominent community leaders to access political positions. Such was the case with Rojas, who in 2009 was made vice president of the La Paz Departmental Autonomous Council, a body established to aid in implementing the department's newly granted political autonomy.

== Political career ==
Beyond minor political posts, the MAS's alliance with El Alto's neighborhood councils granted the organizations a quota on the party's parliamentary lists. For the 2009 general elections, the Federation of Neighborhood Councils was granted the ability to designate two candidates to represent them in the Chamber of Deputies. Rojas was among those selected, being run to represent circumscription 15 of El Alto, the district with the largest number of registered voters in the country. He won by an overwhelming majority, attaining over 100,000 votes, the highest single vote count for any candidate running in a uninominal constituency that cycle. Even so, upon the conclusion of his term, Rojas was not presented for reelection, reflecting the preference of the neighborhood councils towards rotating out their sector's parliamentary representatives. This mechanism of nomination, in which the choice of candidates corresponds to allied social organizations and not the party itself, is the primary reason why so few MAS parliamentarians ever attained reelection.

Though his legislative tenure had concluded, Rojas continued in public service. In mid-2016, a year after leaving the lower chamber, he was appointed to serve as regional manager of the state-owned Public Social Water and Sanitation Company in El Alto, charged with guaranteeing the city's drinking water supply. His tenure coincided with a local water crisis that affected the cities of La Paz and El Alto in late 2016, leading Rojas to implement rationing measures in the city. The decision was criticized by the Federation of Neighborhood Councils, which demanded Rojas' resignation, culminating in his dismissal at the end of November. After that, Rojas retired from public life, dying on 17 October 2022 from undisclosed health complications.

== Electoral history ==
Electoral history of Roberto Rojas
Year	Office	Party	Votes			Result	Ref.
Year	Office	Party	Total	%	P.	Result	Ref.
2009	Deputy	Movement for Socialism	101,051	83.25%	1st	Won	
Source: Plurinational Electoral Organ | Electoral Atlas

Chamber of Deputies of Bolivia
Preceded by Tony Condori	Member of the Chamber of Deputies from La Paz circumscription 15; 2010–2015	Succeeded by Sergio Choque
Preceded by Emeliana Aiza	Leader of the Chamber of Deputies; Movement for Socialism Caucus; 2012–2013	Succeeded by Flora Aguilar
