= David Choquehuanca =

Vice president of Bolivia since 2020

The Most Excellent David Choquehuanca MROU OSP
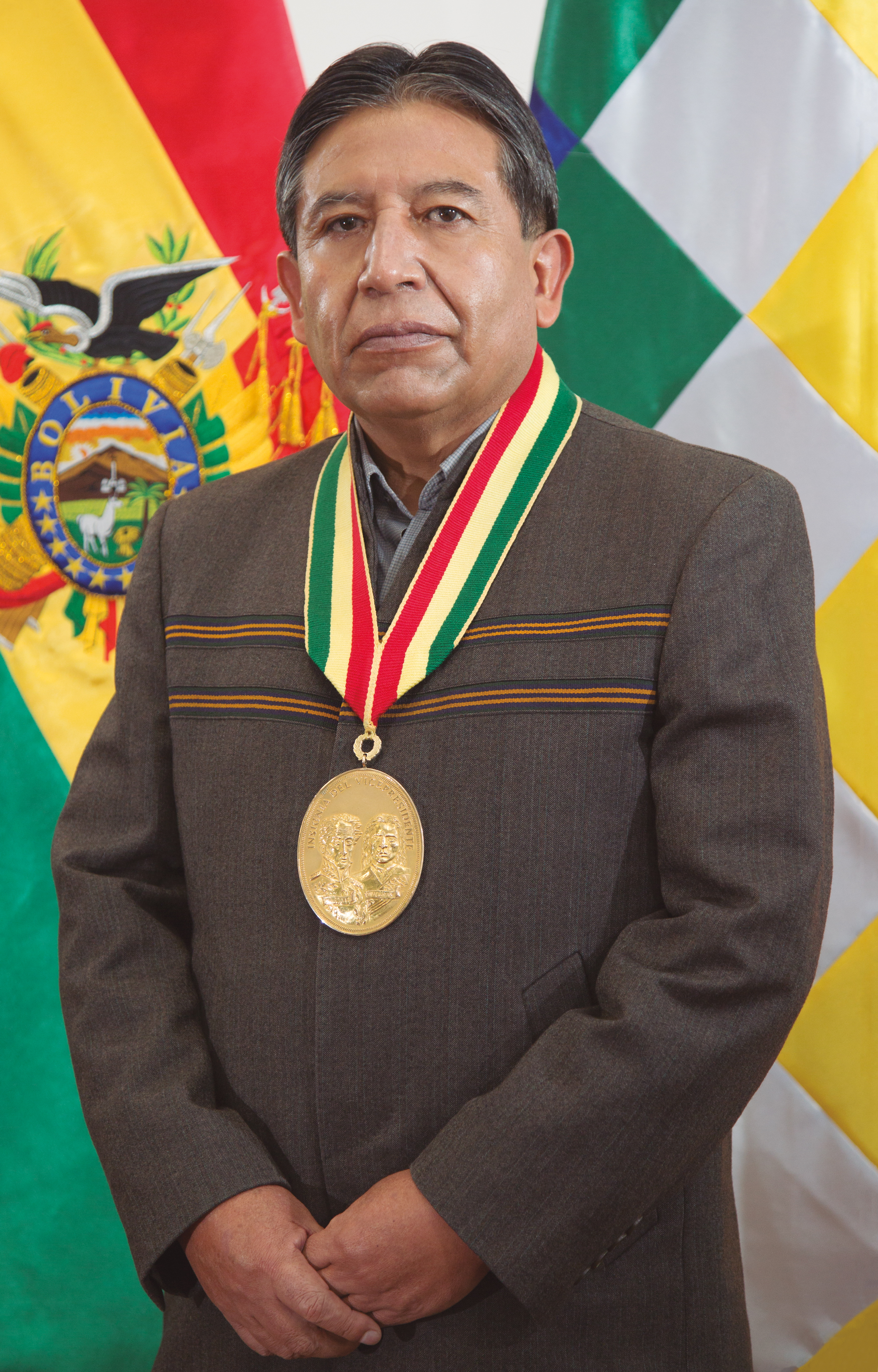
- Official portrait, 2020

39th Vice President of Bolivia
- In office 8 November 2020 – 8 November 2025
- President: Luis Arce
- Preceded by: Álvaro García Linera
- Succeeded by: Edmand Lara

Secretary General of ALBA
- In office 5 March 2017 – 15 November 2019
- Preceded by: Bernardo Álvarez
- Succeeded by: Sacha Llorenti

Minister of Foreign Affairs
- In office 23 January 2006 – 23 January 2017
- President: Evo Morales
- Preceded by: Armando Loaiza
- Succeeded by: Fernando Huanacuni

Personal details
- Born: David Choquehuanca Céspedes; 7 May 1961 (age 65) Cota Cota Baja, La Paz, Bolivia
- Party: Movement for Socialism
- Spouse: Lidia Gutiérrez
- Education: Simón Bolívar Higher Teacher Training School; Niceto Pérez Cadre Training School
- Occupation: Diplomat; politician

David Choquehuanca Céspedes (born 7 May 1961) is a Bolivian diplomat, peasant leader, former politician, and trade unionist who served as the 39th vice president of Bolivia from 2020 to 2025. A member of the Movement for Socialism, he previously served as minister of foreign affairs from 2006 to 2017 and as secretary general of ALBA from 2017 to 2019.

An ethnic Aymara, Choquehuanca was born in Cota Cota Baja, later completing secondary education in Huarina, where he became an adherent of Marxist thought. He studied philosophy at institutes in La Paz and Havana before joining the indigenous peasant labor movement, during which time he became acquainted with cocalero activist Evo Morales, with whom he went on to form the Movement for Socialism. Through the late 1990s and early 2000s, Choquehuanca served as a key advisor to indigenous organizations and peasant leaders, including Morales, and was the national coordinator of the Nina Program, an NGO dedicated to training activist leaders.

In 2006, Morales tapped Choquehuanca to head the Ministry of Foreign Affairs, a position he exercised for over a decade, becoming one of Morales' most trusted government officials. At exactly eleven years, Choquehuanca's tenure was the longest of any foreign minister in Bolivian history and the second-longest of any government minister after Luis Arce. As foreign minister, Choquehuanca oversaw a break in relations with the United States and the expulsion of its ambassador, deepened relations with Bolivia's left-wing neighbors without alienating more conservative Latin American governments, and headed the country's historic lawsuit against Chile at The Hague, though he was no longer in office when the International Court of Justice ruled against Bolivia in 2018. Choquehuanca represented the "moderate Indianist current" within the executive branch, a position that elevated him as the "third figure" in the Morales administration. Choquehuanca's significant grassroots support led him to be promoted as a possible presidential successor to Morales, a concept that strained relations between himself and the president and culminated in his removal as minister in 2017, relegating him to diplomatic "exile" as secretary general of ALBA.

Following Morales' forced removal in 2019, Choquehuanca was put forward by allied social organizations as his party's candidate for the presidency in the rerun general elections scheduled for 2020. However, Morales instead selected Arce to head the ticket, leaving Choquehuanca as his running mate. Elected with fifty-five percent of the vote, Choquehuanca assumed office in November 2020, becoming the country's second indigenous vice president after Víctor Hugo Cárdenas.

== Early life and career ==
=== Childhood and education ===
David Choquehuanca was born on 7 May 1961 in Cota Cota Baja, a minor hamlet situated along the shoreline of Lake Titicaca in La Paz's Omasuyos Province. An ethnic Aymara, Choquehuanca traces his lineage to the Choquehuanca caciques of Asankaru, Peru, a bygone Inca noble family from the line of Paullu, the last titular sapa inca of the Inca Empire—a fact that once led him to controversially describe himself as "the last Inca". Choquehuanca was raised Baptist and spoke only his native language Aymara until age seven, when he also learned Spanish. His father, Nicolás Choquehuanca, was a prominent peasant leader in the neighboring town of Huarina, where he led the local agricultural cooperative. As a child, Choquehuanca's father taught him the base aspects of homesteading, including how to weave and sow as well as fishing and the practice of cuniculture.

Choquehuanca completed primary education in his home town, later moving to Huarina in 1971 to complete secondary at the General José Miguel Lanza School, where he graduated in 1980. As a student, Choquehuanca was introduced to Marxist thought by his philosophy professor, Juan Rodríguez. "He told us that one day we would have to assume responsibilities, and for that, we had to be Marxists", he commented. Per his own account, Choquehuanca's Marxist teachings inspired him to become a revolutionary. Already in his third year, he assisted in organizing his school's first students' union, participating in multiple student protests, for which he was suspended multiple times and even nearly expelled.

Shortly after graduating, Choquehuanca moved to La Paz, studying philosophy at the Simón Bolívar Higher Teacher Training School, during which time he joined another students' group, the Revolutionary Tendency of Student Teachers. He completed only one year at the institute before dropping out to briefly dedicate himself fully to trade union activity. In 1985, he returned to education, receiving a six-month scholarship to attend the Niceto Pérez Cadre Training School in Havana, Cuba, where he was instructed in philosophy and political economics. Returning to Bolivia, Choquehuanca completed postgraduate studies in history and anthropology at the Higher University of San Andrés, later receiving a diploma in indigenous rights from La Paz's Cordillera University in 2002.

=== Peasant movement ===
Starting in the 1980s, Choquehuanca became an active figure in the peasant labor movement, participating in various labor strikes and trade union congresses. Around this time, in 1984, Choquehuanca first crossed paths with cocalero activist Evo Morales during a peasant youth congress. "At the end [of the event], we did a march; the press ... went directly to Evo Morales and not to us, the ones who had organized the meeting. [Morales] has 'something'", Choquehuanca later stated. Together with Morales, Choquehuanca was one of the signatories of the Apaña Manifesto, which outlined the proposal to found a "political instrument" aligned with the interests of the peasant movement and not the traditionally governing political parties—the basis of what later became the Movement for Socialism (MAS-IPSP). The culmination of this was the "500 Years of Resistance" campaign—spearheaded by Morales and Víctor Hugo Cárdenas—which rallied some seventy thousand indigenous peoples in a mass demonstration displaying the rising political power of the indigenist movement.

Moving forward, between 1998 and 2005, Choquehuanca served as national coordinator of the Nina Program, (Note: From nina, meaning "fire" in Aymara.) an NGO dedicated to training and educating leaders of the indigenous peasant movement. During this time, he served as the appointed advisor to various indigenous organizations and peasant leaders, including Morales. As the nascent MAS began to gain a foothold in politics, Choquehuanca was suggested for a multitude of elective positions, even nearly accepting his party's nomination to run for mayor of El Alto. However, he ultimately turned down such opportunities, explaining to Morales in one meeting that "my head has accepted [your offer] because my head is colonized, but my heart does not accept because it is not colonized". As late as 2005, Choquehuanca was put forward as an Aymara candidate for Senate, an offer he again rejected, stating: "what am I going to do as a senator?".

== Minister of Foreign Affairs ==
Following Morales' 2005 election to the presidency, Choquehuanca was appointed to serve as foreign minister in the new president's first cabinet. Morales' inclination toward entrusting Choquehuanca with the foreign affairs portfolio dated as far back as the late 1990s during a visit to Libya, where the future president said as much to the then-Libyan foreign minister. Choquehuanca, however, had not been as keen on the idea, initially seeking out someone else—preferably an Aymara—to fulfill the role. In the end, he ultimately accepted Morales' offer; "I [said], 'if I don't accept, [the new minister] will be the same as always, and one day I will feel guilty", he stated. In assuming office, Choquehuanca became the first indigenous person to occupy the office of foreign minister in Bolivian history.

In his eleven years in office—the longest of any foreign minister in Bolivian history— Choquehuanca established himself as one of the most influential individuals within the president's inner circle, for which he was "unanimously considered the third figure in the ruling party, after Morales and Vice President Álvaro García Linera". As foreign minister, Choquehuanca represented the "moderate Indianist current" in the Morales administration, the faction of MAS supporters that "saw the government's main role as decolonizing Bolivian society". Thanks in part to Choquehuanca's leadership, this group enjoyed the most international visibility, utilizing "idealized versions of Andean culture to project an indigenous image onto the government's ... projects". Though weakened by the excision of its most radical proponents in the early years of Morales' administration, the indigenists nonetheless remained symbolically influential from 2010 onward. This fact gave Choquehuanca significant grassroots support, especially among the Aymara peoples of the Altiplano.

As Choquehuanca's internal influence within the government grew, media outlets increasingly turned their attention to simmering tensions between the foreign minister and other sectors of the Morales administration, particularly those loyal to his vice president, García Linera. According to sociologist Ricardo Calla, the internal schism between the vice president's and foreign minister's entourages had begun even before 2006. This conflict deepened following the failure of the 2016 constitutional referendum, in which voters rejected loosening term limits to allow Morales to seek a fourth mandate. With Morales barred from running for the time being, Choquehuanca increasingly made moves to position himself as the president's successor should the MAS fail to overturn the results through different legal avenues, a fact that drew the ire of the president, leading to a deterioration in their relationship. Amid this power struggle, Choquehuanca's position found itself weakened in the wake of the 2016 water crisis in La Paz, which saw increased scrutiny placed on the then-minister of environment, Alexandra Moreira, and the country's leading water authorities, most of whom had been quotas of Choquehuanca's bloc, with Moreira having previously served as the foreign minister's chief of staff.

According to Calla, the political cost of the water crisis was the final impetus for Choquehuanca's removal. In January 2017, Morales replaced Choquehuanca with Fernando Huanacuni, a figure aligned with García Linera's power base. Moreira was also removed, with the majority of Choquehuanca's remaining allies in the civil service being "swept away" within days of his departure, their positions instead occupied by individuals from the García Linera camp, which emerged as the winner of the longstanding dispute. Shortly after his dismissal, Choquehuanca was appointed to serve as secretary general of the Bolivarian Alliance (ALBA), a position journalist Fernando Molina considered tantamount to being discreetly "exiled" to a secondary diplomatic post. Molina attributed Choquehuanca's removal to the caudillista structure of Bolivian political parties: "The reaction against Choquehuanca was due to the fact that [Morales'] environment could not allow a new president to emerge ... The fall of a leader implies the departure from power of an entire group; therefore, [Morales was] strongly motivated to prevent it".

== Vice President ==
With Choquehuanca in Caracas, Morales pushed forward in seeking a fourth term, a campaign made possible by the abolition of term limits by the Plurinational Constitutional Tribunal. Though the 2019 election results gave Morales the victory, allegations of electoral fraud sunk the country into mass protests, culminating in the president's resignation and flight from the country. With new elections scheduled for 2020 and Morales barred from participating, Choquehuanca—whose service in Caracas was terminated by the interim government's withdrawal from ALBA—once again positioned himself as a viable contender to receive the MAS's nomination for the presidency. Within a month of Morales' removal, the "Túpac Katari" Single Departmental Federation of Peasant Workers of La Paz called an emergency meeting in which representatives from the department's twenty provinces proclaimed Choquehuanca as their preferred presidential candidate. In January, the Pact of Unity—a coalition of MAS-aligned trade syndicates—ratified the federation's decision, declaring that Choquehuanca had been selected as their nominee, accompanied by cocalero activist Andrónico Rodríguez as his running mate. Their decision, however, was rejected by Morales, who instead selected former finance minister Luis Arce to head the MAS's presidential ticket. Choquehuanca, in turn, was relegated as the party's vice-presidential candidate. According to Molina, "Morales and the nucleus of exiles in Argentina put Arce first, both because he seemed to them a better candidate for a moment of economic crisis ... and because they did not want a rival—who is also indigenous—to occupy the main position". Even so, as noted by Molina, "the candidate [actually] elected in Bolivia by the MAS [grassroots] to represent them in the 2020 elections was Choquehuanca".

Morales' decision not to respect Choquehuanca's proclamation quickly became a point of contention among MAS-aligned organizations. The Bolivian Workers' Center rejected Arce's candidacy, instead proposing a ticket headed by Choquehuanca with Orlando Gutiérrez, executive of the Syndical Federation of Bolivian Mineworkers, as his running mate. Likewise, the Bartolina Sisa Confederation and the Túpac Katari Federation both expressed "annoyance" at the lack of respect for their choices, pointing out that Choquehuanca had support from organizations based in seven of the nine departments. For his part, Choquehuanca opted not to challenge Arce's nomination and called on MAS-aligned sectors to accept Morales' decision, a plea that successfully quelled further infighting for the time being. Though unable to secure his party's presidential nomination, Choquehuanca's vice-presidential candidacy nonetheless marked the return of the MAS's indigenist wing to the "upper echelons" of the blue party, especially after the Arce-Choquehuanca ticket overwhelmingly won the 2020 election.

== Electoral history ==
Electoral history of David Choquehuanca
Year	Office	Party	Votes			Result	Ref.
Year	Office	Party	Total	%	P.	Result	Ref.
2020	Vice president	Movement for Socialism	3,393,978	55.10%	1st	Won	
Source: Plurinational Electoral Organ | Electoral Atlas

== Distinctions ==
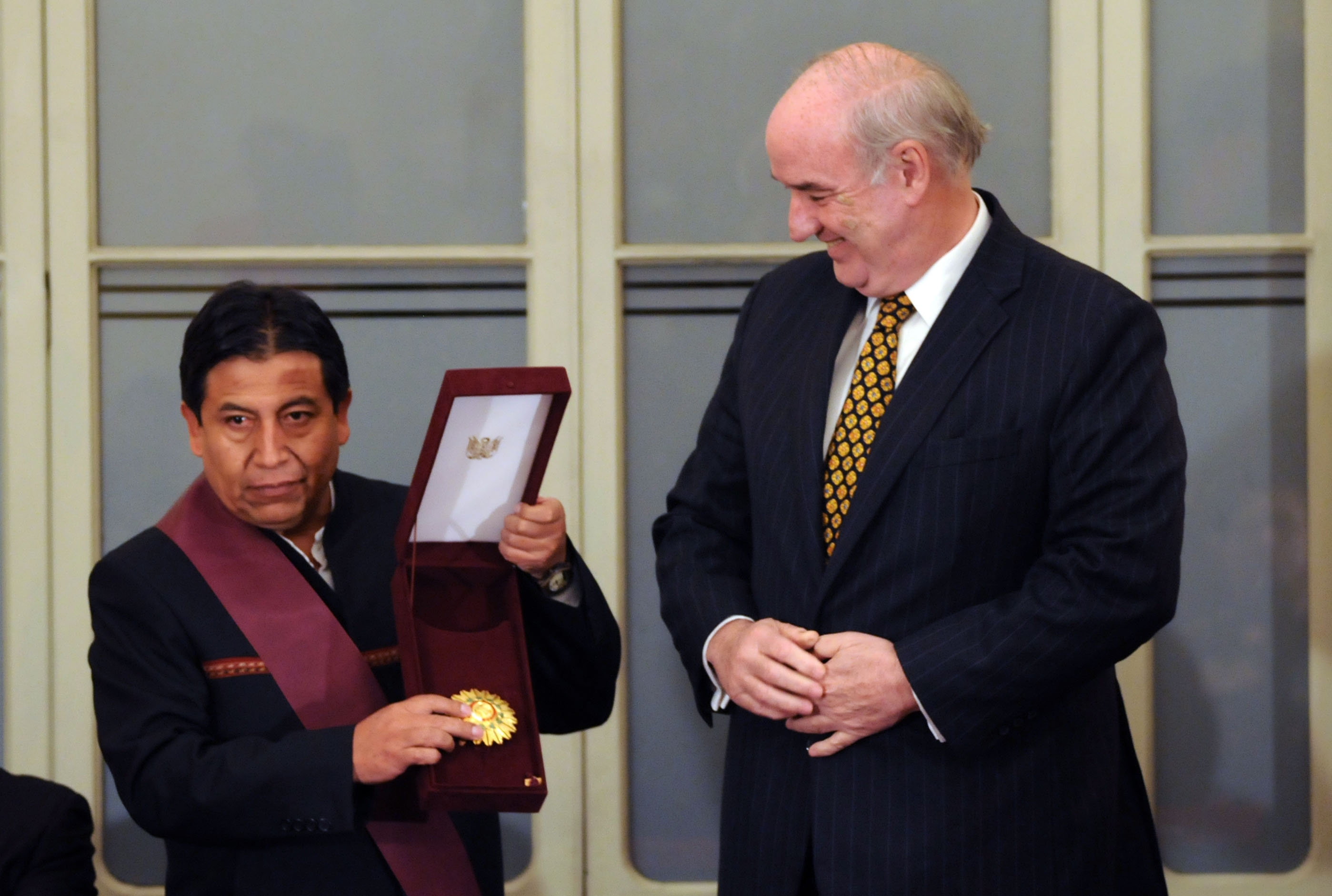
Being decorated with the Order of the Sun of Peru.

Award or decoration	Country	Date	Ref.
Medal of the Oriental Republic of Uruguay	Uruguay	2006	
Grand Cross of the Order of the Sun of Peru	Peru	2010	

Political offices
Preceded by Armando Loaiza	Minister of Foreign Affairs; 2006–2017	Succeeded by Fernando Huanacuni
Preceded by Álvaro García Linera	Vice President of Bolivia; 2020–2025	Succeeded by Edmand Lara
Preceded by Eva Copa as President of the Senate	President of the Plurinational; Legislative Assembly; 2020–2025	Succeeded by Edmand Lara
Diplomatic posts
Preceded by Bernardo Álvarez	Secretary General of ALBA; 2017–2019	Succeeded by Sacha Llorenti
Party political offices
Preceded by Álvaro García Linera	Movimiento al Socialismo nominee for Vice President of Bolivia; 2020	Most recent
