= Reactions to the 2019 Bolivian political crisis =

The following is a list of reactions to the 2019 Bolivian political crisis.

== Domestic ==
The Movement for Socialism (MAS), the governing party of Bolivia, called upon Morales' supporters to defend him.

The Catholic Church in Bolivia said this was not a coup and Pope Francis asked for "peace and serenity". On 18 Dec, Osvaldo Chirveches, Jesuit priest and president of the Conference of Religious of Bolivia observed that "Bolivia is beginning to move and show more positivism. Given the current situation with the recent change of government there are discordant voices and opinions found but we hope that the elections called will mark a new horizon". On 7 January 2020, the Archbishop of El Alto, Eugenio Scarpellini, said that "Those that promote violence cannot become figures of authority". This was in response to statements made by Andrónico Rodríguez, a leading MAS figure and close associate of Morales, suggestion of a return to violence after the 22 January, the day which the new President would have been installed.

In a poll commissioned by the Bolivian NGO group Red UNITAS conducted by Ipsos MORI released on 10 September 2020, 73% of the respondents believed there had been fraud in the 2019 elections, while on the question on whether they believed there had been a coup d'etat, 39% answered yes, while 58% answered no. 83% of the answered yes when asked if the crisis originated from the 2016 Bolivian constitutional referendum on whether to allow Morales further terms.

== International ==
Several American governments and other countries and organizations responded to the resignation; some supported Morales and others were supportive of new elections without him.

=== Supranational bodies ===
- European Union – EU Foreign Policy Chief Federica Mogherini urged restraint and asked the parties to "lead the country peacefully and quietly" to new elections. On 21 December, the Technical Mission of Electoral Experts sent by the European Union published a 67-page report made similar observations and conclusions to that of the OAS. They noted that "there were minutes with an unusually high number of null votes, blank votes and a hundred percent participation of voters in a series of polling stations" and highlighted the general failure of the TSE to declare these irregularities.
- United Nations – On 11 November 2019, the UN Secretary-General António Guterres expressed concern at the situation and urged the parties to "refrain from violence" and exercise "maximum restraint". On 13 December 2019, the UN welcomed a later agreement (known as the Law of Guarantees) made between the interim government and both chambers of government where Morales' MAS party hold majorities. Guterres commented that the "implementation of this law should pave the way for a greater normalization of the situation in the country and the holding of transparent, inclusive and credible elections." On 15 January 2020, Jean Arnault, the envoy of the Secretary General in Bolivia, applauded the decision of the Plurinational Constitutional Court to extend the mandate of the interim government until 22 July 2020 in order to facilitate elections while at the same time stressing "it is essential to give up any violent action or threat of violence. In this context, the Personal Envoy joins the rejection expressed by many national actors to the recent declarations of Mr. Evo Morales.” Evo Morales had suggested the formation of "armed militias" like in Venezuela.
- Socialist International - On 3 January 2020, at a meeting of the Committee for Latin America of Socialist International, it was declared that they accepted the findings of the OAS and that Morales was not a victim of a coup. A document containing discussions of the Bolivian political crisis states that "“After a broad mobilization of citizens in that country in protest of electoral fraud that was informed and verified by an audit conducted by the Organization of American States (OAS) of the elections that took place on October 20, the president Evo Morales did not suffer a coup d'etat.” The SI document states that the new situation in Bolivia “today entails enormous possibilities for Democrats for the full recovery of democracy and the installation of the values of pluralism, alternation and accountability by the authorities. "
- Organization of American States - On 5 December, the OAS published a 95-page report along with 500 pages of corroborating details as appendices. These included that an outside user who controlled a Linux AMI appliance with "root privileges" — conferring the ability to alter results — accessed the official vote-counting server during the counting and that in a sample of 4,692 returns from polling stations around the country, 226 showed multiple signatures by the same person for different voting booths, a violation of electoral law. On those returns, 91 per cent of votes went to MAS, approximately double the rate recorded elsewhere.
- Inter-American Commission on Human Rights - On 10 December the IACHR released a preliminary report investigating possible human rights violations during the crisis stating that there were "strong indications of human rights violations, with profound repercussions for the life of Bolivian society". Bolivia's interim government disputed the report, but expressed its willingness for an international investigation to look further into the acts of violence and human rights violations, and to establish who is responsible for them. On 12 December, an agreement was made to form an investigatory committee composed of four high-level technical professionals with abundant experience in the protection of human rights with these experts appointed by the IACHR. They were promised access to the records of "all criminal investigations and cases opened in this context, to public government reports on these events, and to all facilities, infrastructure, resources, and means necessary for [the committee] to do its job, as well as all security measures needed, in keeping with Bolivia’s legislation."

=== American governments ===
- Argentina – The outgoing incumbent government of Argentina called for "all sides to talk to restore peace".
  - Early responses
    - Outgoing president Mauricio Macri said that new elections will help Bolivia find a peaceful exit of the crisis.
    - Both houses of the National Congress—the Chamber of Deputies and the Senate—passed a "strong repudiation of the coup d'état in Bolivia".
    - Members of Juntos por el Cambio, the political coalition that currently rules the country, are deeply divided in their responses, which range from denunciation of a coup to justification of the security forces' intervention.
    - The president-elect Alberto Fernández, as well as vice president-elect and former president of Argentina Cristina Fernández de Kirchner, both condemned what they described as a coup and stated that the "democratic processes should be respected".
  - Later responses
    - On 12 December, Morales departed from Mexico and took asylum in Argentina.
    - After Morales' statements about the formation of "armed militias" in Bolivia, the Chamber of Deputies of Argentina issued a resolution "to address the Executive Power of the Nation through the corresponding agencies (National Commission for Refugees) to deny the procedure of refuge of the former president of Bolivia, Evo Morales, and also revoke the procedure of asylum with which he has been benefited."
    - According to Infobae, Argentine government officials conveyed a personal message from Fernández to Morales stating "Argentina does not endorse the popular armed militias because it goes against all the democratic spirit of living in peace and under the parameters of human rights.”
    - On 19 January 2020, one month after the installation of Argentina's new government, foreign secretary Karen Longevic announced their recognition of diplomats accredited by President Jeanine Ánez and anticipated a "fluid relationship" with that nation.
- Brazil – President Jair Bolsonaro called the situation a "lesson for everyone" and a "win for democracy".
  - Former President and opposition leader Luiz Inácio Lula da Silva condemned the Brazilian President's statement, dubbing the situation as a 'coup' and stating that it was "regrettable that Latin America has an economic elite who do not know how to live with democracy and the social inclusion of the poorest".
- Canada – Canadian Foreign Affairs Minister Chrystia Freeland made a statement that Canada called on Bolivian political and social actors to "exercise restraint and avoid violence and confrontation". Global Affairs Canada (GAC) spokesman John Babcock stated that Canada would work with and support the Áñez government in its caretaker role until elections are held. One GAC official stated that Canada would not use the term "recognition", nor would it likely refer to Áñez as "President Áñez".
- Chile – Chile's government expressed concern at the "interrupted electoral process" and called for a "prompt peaceful and democratic solution within the framework of the constitution".
- Colombia – Colombia's foreign ministry issued a statement in which it called for the "mobilisation of the international community for a process of peaceful transition".
- Costa Rica – Costa Rica's President, Carlos Alvarado Quesada has called for the politicians and citizens of Bolivia to act with respect and prudence in these times after the resignation of Morales and various members of the Government in the line of succession, and to support the democratic norms of Bolivia. He has further called for elections to renovate the democratic leadership which, he says, ought to prevail in Bolivia.
- Cuba – Both Cuba's foreign minister Bruno Rodríguez Parrilla and President Miguel Díaz-Canel condemned what they termed a coup d'état in Bolivia. In January 2020, Parrilla called President Jeanine Áñez "liar," "coup" and "self-proclaimed" in reference to her latest statements about the role of Cuban doctors in the country. On 24 January 2020, Bolivia broke off diplomatic ties with Cuba as a direct result of these statements.
- Mexico – Mexico's foreign minister Marcelo Ebrard viewed the resignation as a coup and offered political asylum to Morales.
- Nicaragua – The Nicaraguan government strongly condemned the situation and described it as a coup against Morales, stating that Nicaragua rejected "fascist practices that ignore the constitution, laws and institutionalism that govern the democratic life of nations".
- Peru – The Government of Peru called for a "transition to peace" and new elections in Bolivia.
- United States:
  - U.S. President Donald Trump welcomed Morales resignation as "a significant moment for democracy in the Western Hemisphere" and he said in written statement that Morales's departure preserves democracy and paves the way for the Bolivian people to have their voices heard. President Trump also said that Morales resignation sends a strong signal to the "illegitimate regimes" in Venezuela and Nicaragua.
  - The State Department official said the country is monitoring the political situation in Bolivia and calling on civilian leadership to maintain control. It has also warned Americans to avoid all travel to Bolivia "due to civil unrest."
- Uruguay – The Government of Uruguay condemned the events as a coup d'état and expressed dismay at the "breakdown of the rule of law" in Bolivia, stating that it believed no argument could justify these acts following Morales' already expressed support for a new general election.
- Venezuela – The two disputed Venezuelan leaders gave opposing views.
  - Nicolás Maduro condemned what he called a coup against Morales. Maduro further urged "all social and political groups across the globe to protest the Bolivian military's action".
  - Juan Guaidó took the opposite side, by supporting the "transition of power" and stating that Latin America was feeling a "democratic hurricane." Guaidó has also recognized Áñez as interim president of Bolivia until new presidential elections are held.
  - In response, Interim President Jeanine Áñez recognized Juan Guaidó as interim president of Venezuela and called on Guaidó to appoint the new Venezuelan Ambassador to Bolivia, "who will be recognized immediately by our government." The interim government also severed diplomatic relations with Venezuela's Maduro government, giving its diplomats 72 hours to leave the country.

=== Other governments ===
- China – Chinese Foreign Ministry spokesperson Geng Shuang called for dialogue between the two parties, for them to "resolve their differences peacefully within the framework and constitution and laws," adding that China hoped Bolivia could "restore social stability as soon as possible."
- Iran – The Iranian Foreign Ministry has condemned a "coup in Bolivia and change of government without a legal basis." It also accused the United States of interfering the internal affairs of Bolivia.
- Portugal – The Portuguese Assembly of the Republic passed a resolution expressing concern about the political situation in Bolivia, and called for the restoration of "democratic normality". Resolutions condemning or condoning Morales' resignation were rejected.
- Russia – Russia's Foreign Ministry urged all political forces to "show common sense" and accused Bolivia's opposition of "unleashing a new wave of violence" in the country, calling the events "an orchestrated coup."
- Spain – Spain criticized the role of Bolivia's police and Army in Morales' resignation, calling it an illegal "intervention", which marked a "return to moments in the past history of Latin America". It further urged the parties to "overcome the institutional vacuum" and ensure the security of all citizens, representatives of the media, civil society, as well as Morales, his relatives and members of his administration.
- Syria – Syria's foreign ministry strongly condemned what it considered a military coup in Bolivia and stated that it "expresses solidarity with the legitimately elected President Evo Morales".
- Turkey – Turkey's Foreign Ministry has expressed concern over the developments in Bolivia that it deems have resulted in the resignation of President Evo Morales and stated that it believes in the principle that governments come into power through a democratic process.

== Allegations of lithium mining agenda ==
In an interview published by Agence France-Presse on 24 December 2019, Morales said from Argentina, "I'm absolutely convinced it's a coup against lithium," backed by the United States. Morales had earlier made similar declarations during an interview with Glenn Greenwald of The Intercept. Several sources, however, including those from the mining industry itself, question this motive and the value of Bolivian's lithium. However other sources have indicated that there is substantial global interest in Bolivia's lithium industry with countries like Germany and China, expressing their desire to exploit jointly the huge lithium reserves in the country. When confronted by a Twitter user alleging that the US government manufactured a coup in Bolivia to secure access to the country's lithium reserves, Elon Musk, CEO of electric vehicle manufacturer Tesla, responded in a since-deleted tweet, "We will coup whoever we want! Deal with it!"; lithium is a crucial ingredient of the lithium-ion batteries that power Tesla vehicles.

== See also ==
- Responses to the Venezuelan presidential crisis
- 2019–2020 Mexico–Bolivia diplomatic crisis
