= Santiago de Huata Municipality =

Town in La Paz, Bolivia

Santiago de Huata
- Municipality
- Location within Bolivia
- Coordinates: 16°05′00″S 68°50′00″W
- Country: Bolivia
- Department: La Paz
- Province: Omasuyos

Government
  - Mayor: Roberto Huaycho Villca

Area
  - Total: 125 km^{2} (48 sq mi)
- Elevation: 3,911 m (12,831 ft)

Population (2020)
  - Total: 9,158
  - Density: 73.3/km^{2} (190/sq mi)

Language
  - Official: Spanish
- Time zone: UTC-4 (BOT)

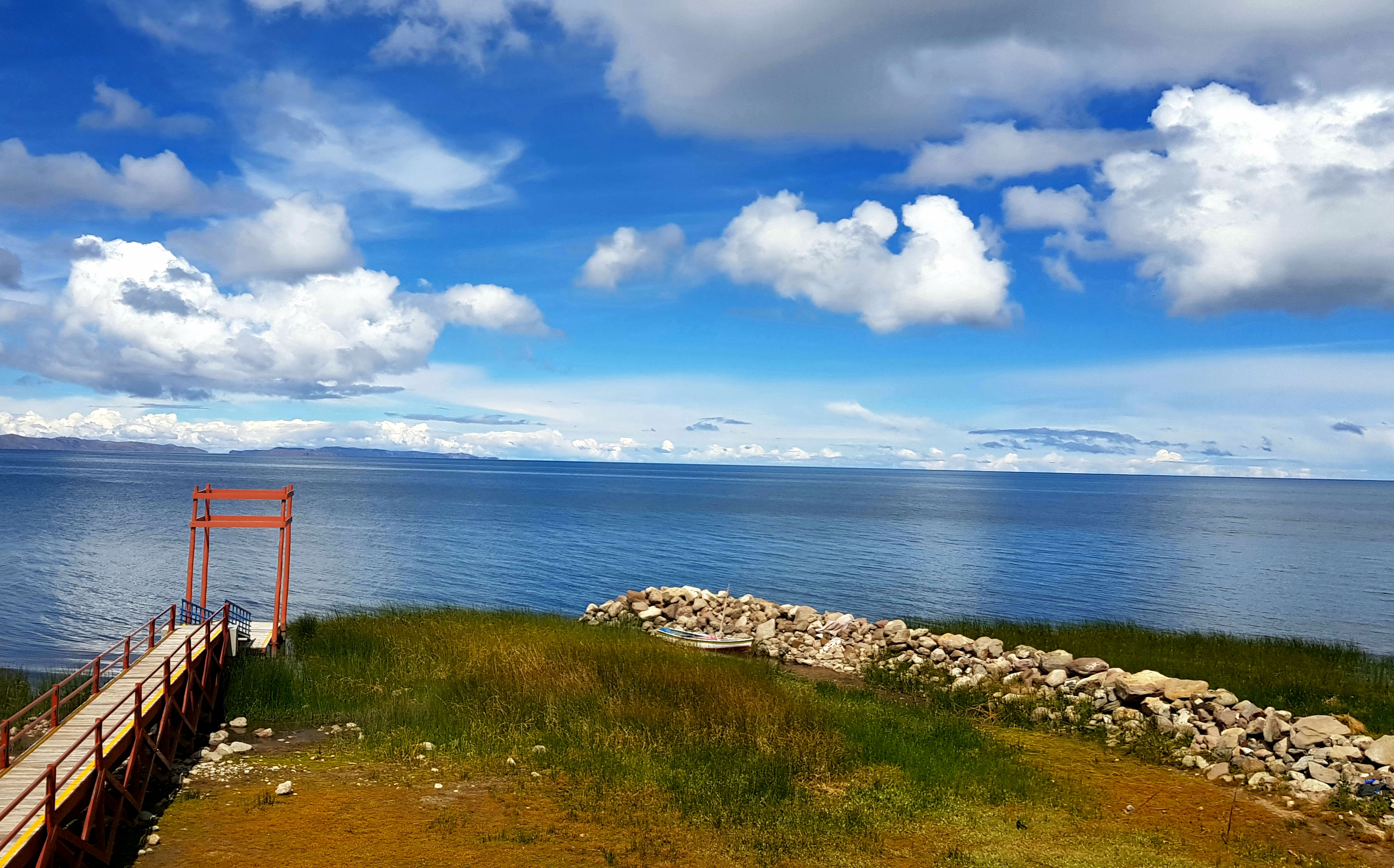

Santiago de Huata is a town and municipality in Omasuyos Province, La Paz Department, Bolivia. It is located in the eastern shore of Lake Titicaca, at an average elevation of 3911 meters above the sea level. The municipality has a population of 9,158 in 2020.

== Climate ==
Santiago de Huata has a Tundra Climate (ET) under the Köppen Climate Classification. It receives the most rainfall in January, with an average precipitation of 222 mm; and the least rainfall in July, with an average precipitation of 17 mm.

Climate data for Santiago de Huata
Month	Jan	Feb	Mar	Apr	May	Jun	Jul	Aug	Sep	Oct	Nov	Dec	Year
Mean daily maximum °C (°F)	11.7 (53.1)	11.8 (53.2)	11.8 (53.2)	11.5 (52.7)	11.6 (52.9)	11.5 (52.7)	11.3 (52.3)	12.3 (54.1)	13.0 (55.4)	13.3 (55.9)	13.7 (56.7)	12.4 (54.3)	12.2 (53.9)
Daily mean °C (°F)	8.7 (47.7)	8.7 (47.7)	8.7 (47.7)	8.4 (47.1)	8.0 (46.4)	7.6 (45.7)	7.1 (44.8)	7.7 (45.9)	8.5 (47.3)	9.2 (48.6)	9.8 (49.6)	9.2 (48.6)	8.5 (47.3)
Mean daily minimum °C (°F)	6.2 (43.2)	6.3 (43.3)	6.2 (43.2)	5.7 (42.3)	4.8 (40.6)	4.1 (39.4)	3.4 (38.1)	3.8 (38.8)	4.6 (40.3)	5.6 (42.1)	6.5 (43.7)	6.5 (43.7)	5.3 (41.6)
Average rainfall mm (inches)	222 (8.7)	185 (7.3)	145 (5.7)	74 (2.9)	26 (1.0)	18 (0.7)	17 (0.7)	23 (0.9)	41 (1.6)	76 (3.0)	98 (3.9)	176 (6.9)	1,101 (43.3)
Source: Climate-Data.org
