= Janq'u K'ark'a (Larecaja-Omasuyos) =

Mountain in Bolivia

- Location within Bolivia

Highest point
- Elevation: 5,200 m (17,100 ft)
- Coordinates: 15°54′56″S 68°32′55″W

Geography
- Location: Bolivia, La Paz Department, Larecaja Province, Omasuyos Province
- Parent range: Andes, Cordillera Real

Janq'u K'ark'a (Aymara janq'u white, k'ark'a crevice, fissure, crack, "white crevice", also spelled Jankho Kharka) is a mountain in the Cordillera Real in the Andes of Bolivia, about 5,200 metres (17,060 ft) high. It is situated in the La Paz Department, Larecaja Province, Sorata Municipality, and in the Omasuyos Province, Achacachi Municipality. Janq'u K'ark'a lies south of the Janq'u Uma-Illampu massif, southeast of the mountain Quña Quñani and the lakes Warawarani (Huara Huarani) and Jisk'a Warawarani (Jiskha Huara Huarani).

== See also ==
- Q'ara Qullu
