= Rogelio Mayta =

Bolivian Minister of Foreign Affairs

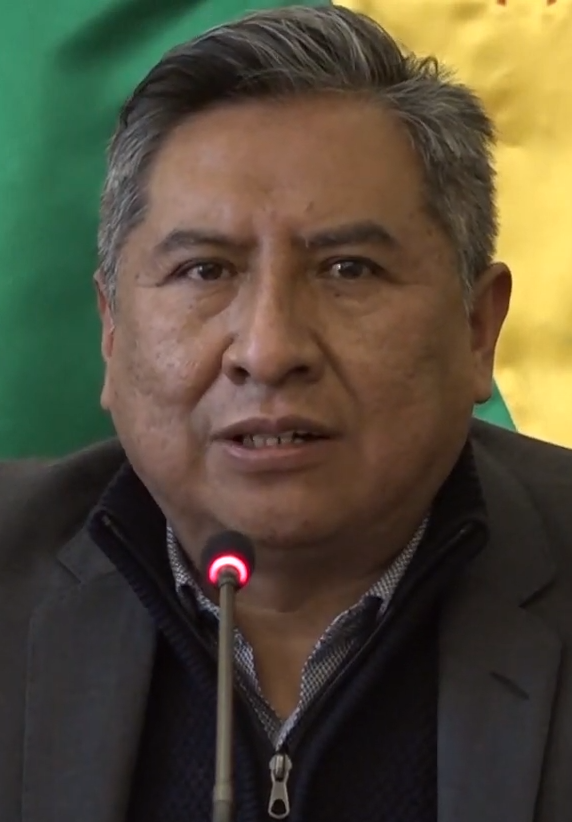

Minister of Foreign Affairs
- In office 9 November 2020 – 15 November 2023
- President: Luis Arce
- Preceded by: Karen Longaric
- Succeeded by: Celinda Sosa Lunda

Personal details
- Born: Rogelio Mayta Mayta; 16 September 1971 (age 53); La Paz, Bolivia
- Political party: Movement for Socialism
- Education: Higher University of San Andrés

Rogelio Mayta Mayta (born 16 September 1971) is a Bolivian lawyer and politician who served as the Foreign Minister of Bolivia from 9 November 2020 to 15 November 2023 under the administration of Luis Arce.

== Biography ==
Rogelio Mayta was born on 16 September 1971. He graduated as a lawyer by profession. During the course of his career, Mayta served as defense counsel for victims of the "Massacre of Black October" in El Alto which took place in 2003 during the Bolivian gas conflict. He was part of the committee promoting the liability trial against the former President Gonzalo Sánchez de Lozada who resigned and fled to the United States following the incident.

He entered Bolivian politics at 48 years of age, participating in the 2019 general elections as a candidate for the position of Senator for the Department of La Paz on behalf of the Movement for Socialism, however those results were annulled following alleged fraud.

== Foreign minister (2020–2023) ==
Following the election of Luis Arce in the 2020 general elections, Mayta was appointed to the position of Foreign Minister (Chancellor), the head of foreign relations. As Foreign Minister, Mayta oversaw the reversal of the previous conservative government's foreign policy and a return to the foreign policy of the pre-2019 Evo Morales government. On 13 December 2020, Mayta announced Bolivia's intent to rebuild relations with Venezuela, Mexico, Cuba, Argentina, Nicaragua, and Iran, all of which had been frozen by the government of Jeanine Áñez. Mayta said in a statement that "[Bolivia] must advance unity of the region and that is why we must talk with all nations," and discussed efforts to recover export agreements with Cuba and announced the reopening of the Bolivian embassy in Iran. He also made known the country's intent to appoint Bolivian ambassadors to those nations.

Speaking to Página Siete, Mayta reported that on 10 December he had met with Charge d'affaires Charisse Phillips to discuss rapprochement with the United States. He spoke of the hope of building "reciprocal trust" between the two countries and stressed that the administration of Donald Trump had given "evidence to distrust." He pointed to 20 January 2021, the day of the inauguration of President Joe Biden, as a basis for necessary steps in rebuilding bilateral relations. At the same time, Mayta praised the "excellent level of dialogue, understanding and cooperation" between Bolivia and Russia. In general, the Foreign Minister stressed the country's willingness to "having relations with all countries, all states, all peoples, but based on respect for sovereignty."

On 4 January 2021, the Ministry of Foreign Affairs reported that Mayta had contracted COVID-19 but that he was stable and quarantining "under proper medical control." He returned to his duties on 28 January.

Political offices
Vacant Title last held by Karen Longaric	Minister of Foreign Affairs; 2020–present	Incumbent
