= Wari Qalluni Pata =

Mountain in Bolivia

- Location within Bolivia

Highest point
- Elevation: 5,064 m (16,614 ft)
- Coordinates: 15°56′56″S 68°30′20″W

Geography
- Location: Bolivia, La Paz Department, Larecaja Province, Omasuyos Province
- Parent range: Andes, Cordillera Real

Wari Qalluni Pata (Aymara wari vicuña, qallu cattle with baby animals, -ni a suffix, pata step, 'a step with vicuñas and their babies', also spelled Huari Kallunipata) is a 5,064-metre-high (16,614 ft) mountain in the Cordillera Real in the Andes of Bolivia. It is situated in the La Paz Department, Larecaja Province, Guanay Municipality, and in the Omasuyos Province, Achacachi Municipality, west of the mountain Ch'iyar Juqhu.
