= Fernando Huanacuni =

Bolivian politician (born 1966)

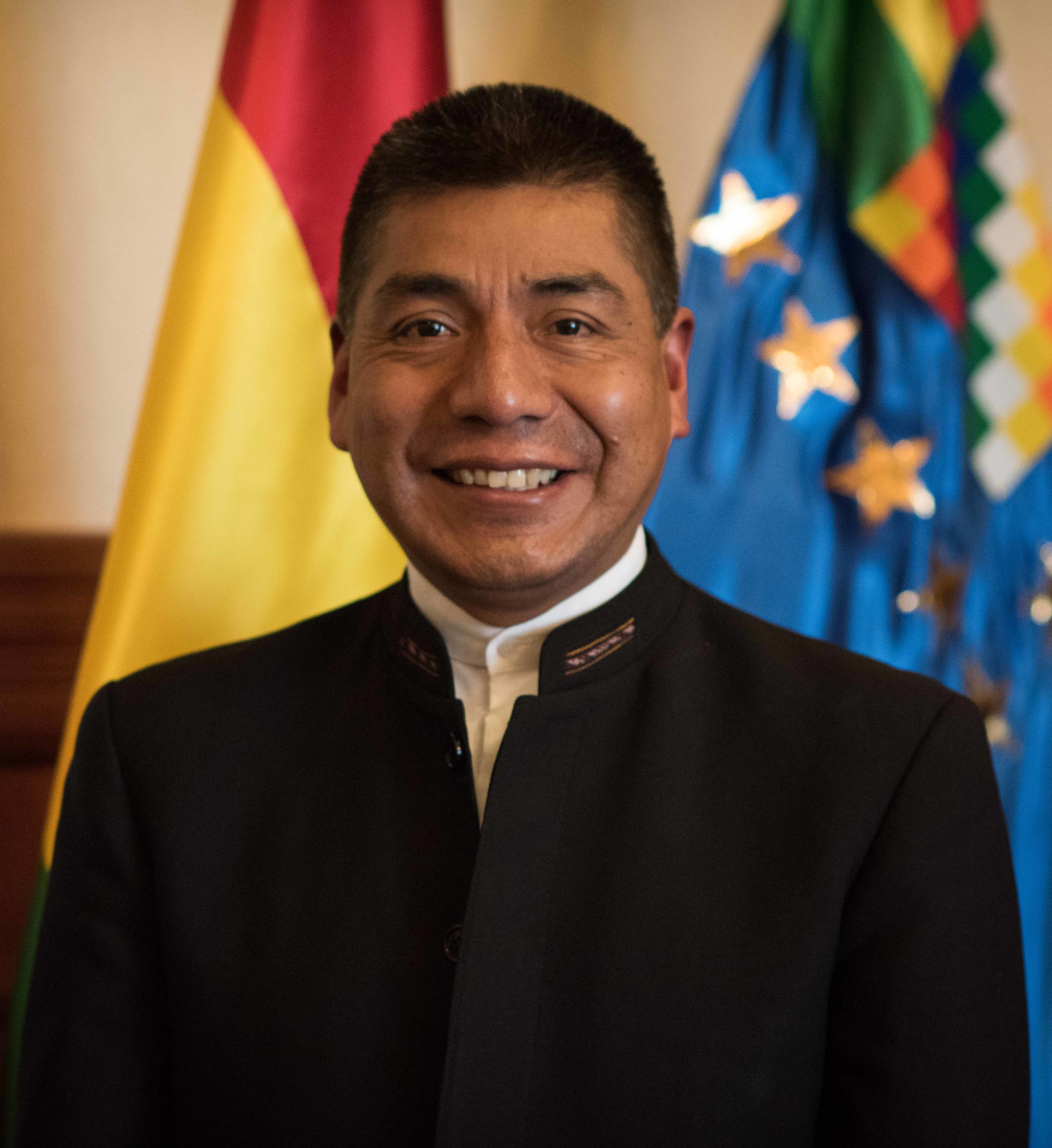
- Huanacuni in 2017

Minister of Foreign Affairs
- In office 23 January 2017 – 4 September 2018
- President: Evo Morales
- Preceded by: David Choquehuanca
- Succeeded by: Diego Pary Rodríguez

Personal details
- Born: May 29, 1966 (age 60) La Paz, Bolivia
- Party: MAS-IPSP
- Education: University of San Andrés
- Occupation: Politician, lawyer and researcher

Fernando Huanacuni Mamani (born May 29, 1966) is a Bolivian politician, lawyer and researcher. He served as the Foreign Minister of Bolivia from 2017 to 2018.

== Early life and education ==
Fernando Huanacuni Mamani was born on May 29, 1966, in the city of La Paz, Bolivia. He earned his law degree from the University of San Andrés (UMSA) of the city of La Paz. He has a diploma in Psychology of Learning from Chile in 2010, and studied Research and Intercultural pedagogies in Bogotá, Colombia in 2014. He received higher Education of the Faculty of Humanities at the University of San Andrés in 2014 as well.

== Career ==
=== Government positions and research ===
Huanacuni's research consists of indigenous peoples' ancestral world view and history. He is also a political activist in both Bolivia and internationally. He promotes the reconstruction of ancestral identity of the original indigenous nations. In 1983, he began touring South America, Central America, North America and Europe, lecturing on the value of ancestral knowledge, and motivating the return to logical thought and communal practices.

Huanacuni was also part of the designed team for the curriculum of the Law Avelino Sinani – Elizardo Perez. During the first stage, his role was as an expert of Cosmovision, and ancient philosophies, of indigenous peoples and communities, for the Ministry of Education and Culture of Bolivia. From 2008 he worked at the Ministry of Foreign Affairs of Bolivia as the Director of Ceremonial practices and implementation for the Plurinational State of Bolivia. He had the rank of ambassador until September 2014.

=== Teaching and media ===
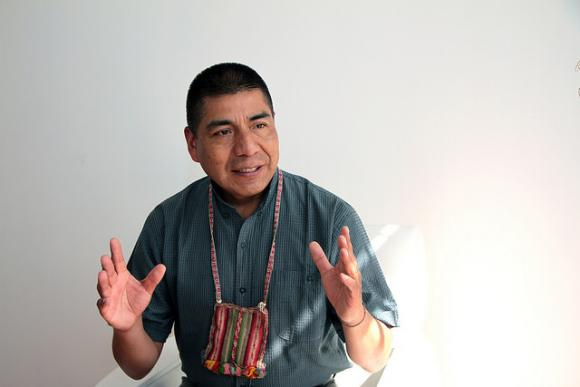
An interview appearance in 2014

He was director and presenter for the Manatial Magazine Taypi Uta transmitted by Channel 4 RTP from 2005 until 2010 in La Paz, Bolivia. He also produced and hosted the weekly Pacha Ajayu program with journalist Eduardo Godoy from 2004 until 2010, broadcast by the same network. He was a columnist for the national newspaper CAMBIO from 2012 until 2013.

He also taught as a graduate professor "Construction and Management Community Curricula" of the Universidad Mayor de San Andrés in 2008. He then taught at the University Center AGRUCO of the Universidad Mayor San Simon in 2010. From 2014 until 2015 he also taught at the Simon Bolivar Andean University, in the field of Constitutional Law, Public Administration Judicial and Constitutional Litigation, specializing in Legal Pluralism, Jurisdictional Demarcation and the Court of Law. He was a researcher at the International Institute of Integration Agreement, Andrés Bello Catholic University, in 2015. He remains an educator and researcher of the legal sphere of indigenous peoples, and faculty member of the law department at the University of San Andres as of 2015. He is also a presiding chair and senior fellow of the Center of Studies – Andean Amazonian Cosmovision SARIRI, (C.E.C.A.A.S).

=== Chancellor of Bolivia ===
He has served as the Foreign Minister of Bolivia from 23 January 2017 to 4 September 2018.

== Publications ==
=== As author ===
- Vivir Bien/Buen Vivir Filosofía, Políticas, Estrategias y Experiencias Regionales
  - First Edition: Lima, Perú, February 2010
  - Second Edition: La Paz, Bolivia, April 2010
  - Third Edition: Lima, Perú, June 2010
  - Fourth Edition: La Paz, Bolivia, October 2010
  - Fifth Edition: Buenos Aires, Argentina, September 2013
  - Sixth Edition: La Paz, Bolivia, July 2015
- Visión Cósmica de los Andes. Editorial Librería Armonía. Third Edition. La Paz, Bolivia.
- Llatunka: La Sabiduría Ancestral. Editorial Librería Armonía. Third Edition. La Paz, Bolivia.

=== As co-author ===
- El hombre que volvió a nacer of Policarpio Flores Apaza. First Edition November 1999, Editorial Armonía. Second Edition, March 2005, Editorial Plural. Third Edition, April 2009.
- Vivir Bien: Infancia, Género y Economía. CIDES UMSA. La Paz, Bolivia. 2013
- Las Universidades Indígenas, Experiencias y Visiones para el Futuro. Instituto de Integración Convenio Andrés Bello 2013. La Paz, Bolivia
- Conjunto de Visiones sobre la Postmodernidad. December 2012. Publisher Casa de la Libertad. Sucre, Bolivia
- Transiciones hacia el Vivir Bien o la Construcción de un nuevo proyecto político en el Estado Plurinacional de Bolivia. Ministry of Culture of Bolivia. La Paz, Bolivia 2012
- Ética Ambiental y Política Pública. Fondo Editorial de la Universidad Antonio Ruiz de Montoya. Lima, Perú 2009.

== See also ==
- List of foreign ministers in 2017
- List of current foreign ministers

Political offices
| Preceded by David Choquehuanca | Minister of Foreign Affairs; 2017–2018 | Succeeded by Diego Pary Rodríguez |
