= Warisata =

- Town
- Location within Bolivia
- Coordinates: 15°58′S 68°40′W
- Country: Bolivia
- Department: La Paz Department
- Province: Omasuyos Province
- Municipality: Achacachi Municipality

Population (2001)
  - Total: 838
- Time zone: UTC-4 (BOT)

Warisata is a location in the La Paz Department in Bolivia.
