= Karen Longaric =

Bolivian lawyer and politician

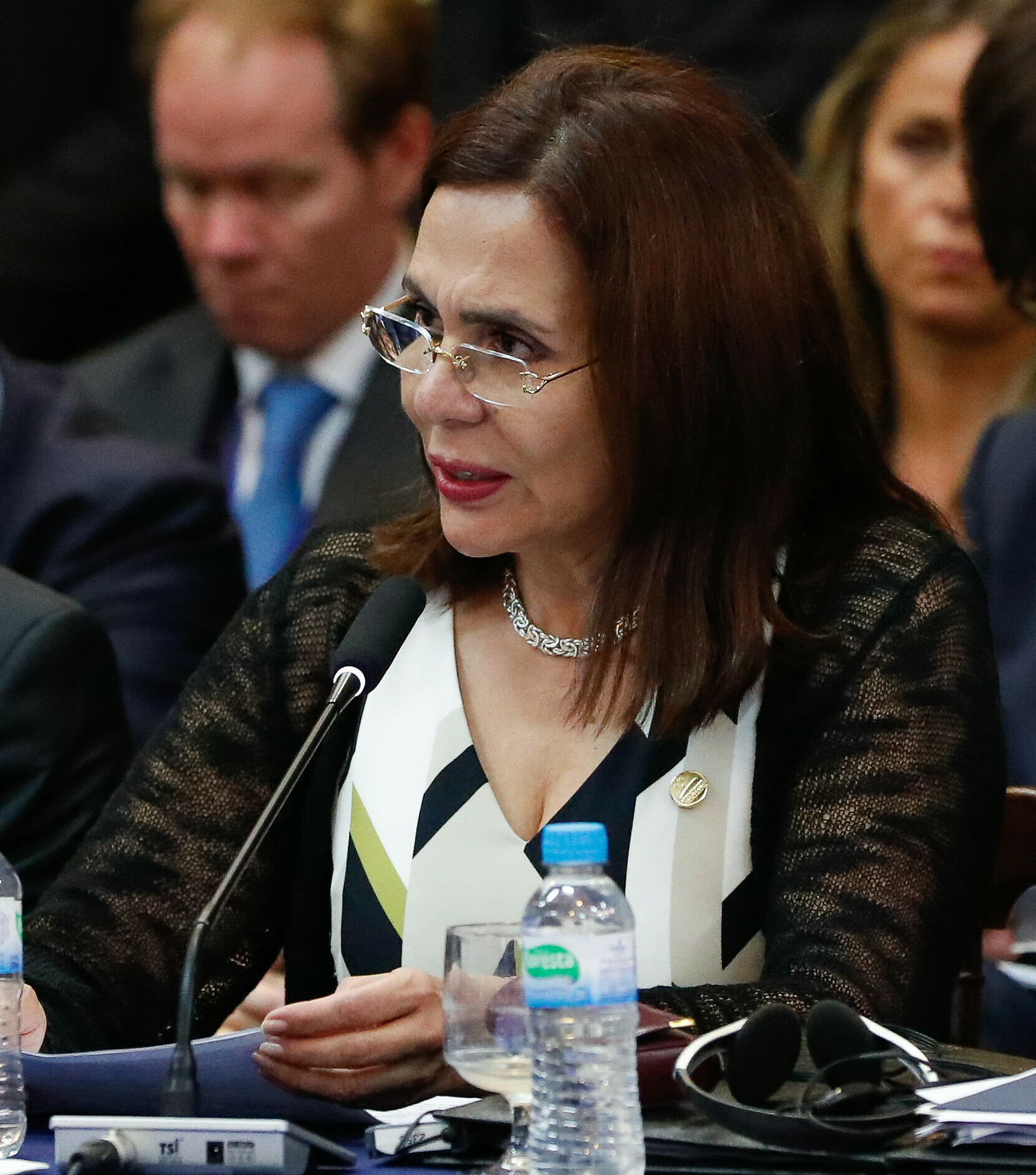

Minister of Foreign Affairs
- In office 13 November 2019 – 8 November 2020
- President: Jeanine Áñez
- Preceded by: Diego Pary Rodríguez
- Succeeded by: Rogelio Mayta

Personal details
- Born: Karen Longaric Rodríguez; Sucre, Bolivia
- Spouse: Juan Anaya Vázquez
- Education: Higher University of San Andrés; University of Havana
- Occupation: Lawyer

Karen Longaric Rodríguez is a Bolivian lawyer, professor, columnist and politician who served as the Foreign Minister of Bolivia during the interim administration of Jeanine Áñez.

She held positions in the Bolivian Ministry of Foreign Affairs as Director of International Organizations and as Director of Legal Affairs and International Treaties.

== Biography ==
Karen Longaric Rodríguez was born in Sucre. She is a graduate in law of the Higher University of San Andrés (UMSA) in La Paz and has a doctorate in international law and legal studies from the University of Havana. She is a veteran of foreign relations, having worked for in the foreign ministry since 1980.

Prior to her current position, she has twice held positions in the Foreign Ministry of Bolivia, first as Director of International Organizations and then as Director of Legal Affairs and International Treaties.

In July 2020, she announced that she had tested positive for COVID-19 and had to self-isolate at home.

== Bolivian Foreign Minister ==
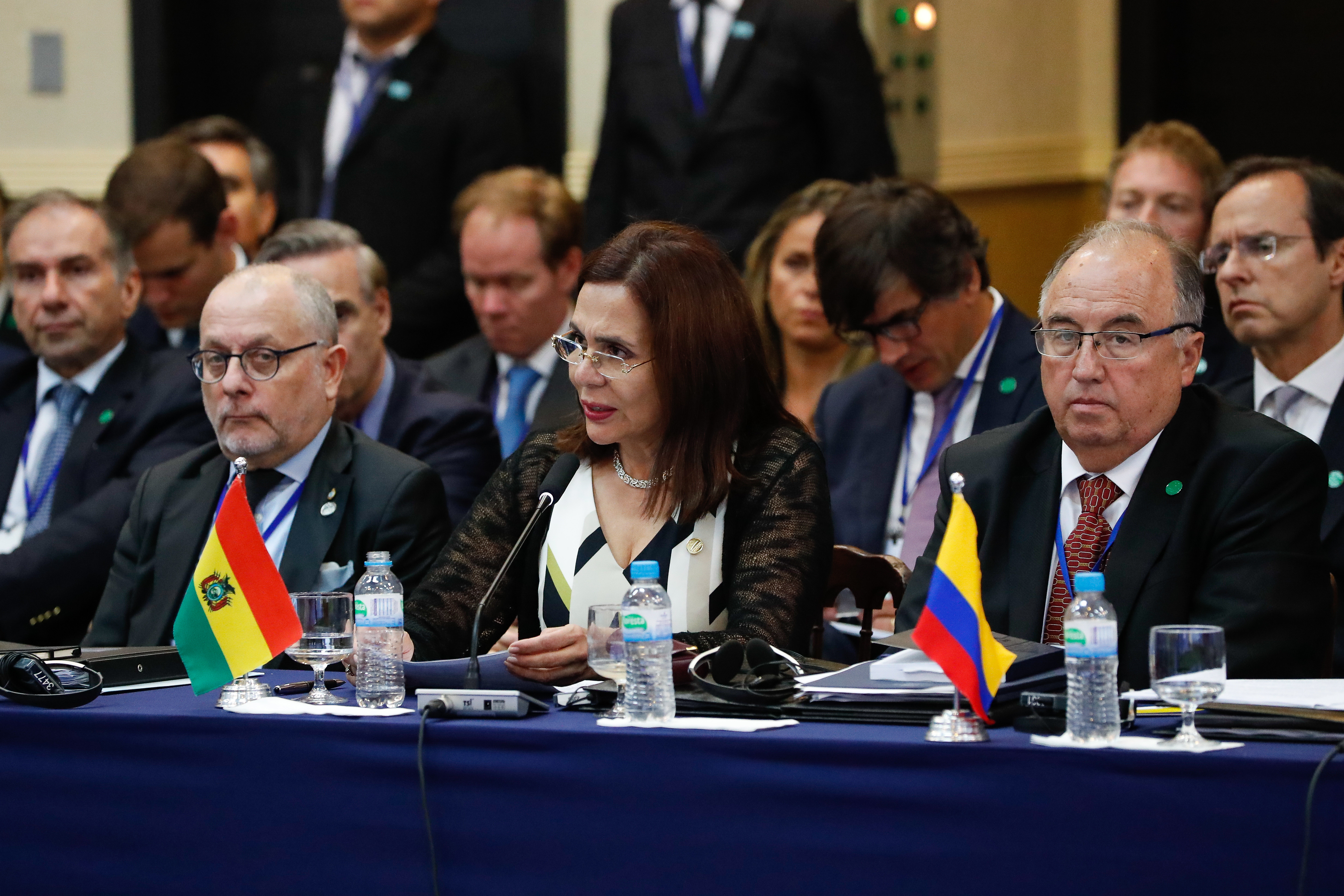
Longaric at a Mercosur summit in Brazil.

On 13 November 2019, she was named as Minister for Foreign Affairs. Her main focus since her appointment has been to boost and strengthen ties with other countries, especially with those where relations had been broken during the government of Evo Morales, such as the United States and Canada, while distancing Bolivia from strong allies of Morales. In of her first acts as minister, she announced an immediate rejection of the government of Nicolás Maduro and pledged support for the acting President of Venezuela, Juan Guaidó. This new alignment was also signalled by her announcement of Bolivia's withdrawal from the ALBA group and subsequent joining of the Lima Group.

On 15 November 2019, Longaric expelled 725 Cuban citizens, mostly medical doctors, after she raised concerns about their alleged involvement in protests. In January 2020, her ministry suspended relations with Cuba in response to remarks made by Cuban counterpart Bruno Rodríguez Parrilla, who called Áñez a "liar," "coupist" and "self-proclaimed" in reference to her latest statements about the role of Cuban medical doctors in the country.

Diplomatic relationships between Bolivia and Mexico have been strained under the interim government, giving rise to the 2019–2020 Mexico–Bolivia diplomatic crisis.

Political offices
Preceded by Diego Pary Rodríguez	Minister of Foreign Affairs; 2019–2020	Succeeded by Rogelio Mayta
