= Diego Pary =

Bolivian indigenous leader, educator, politician and diplomat

Diego Pary Rodríguez
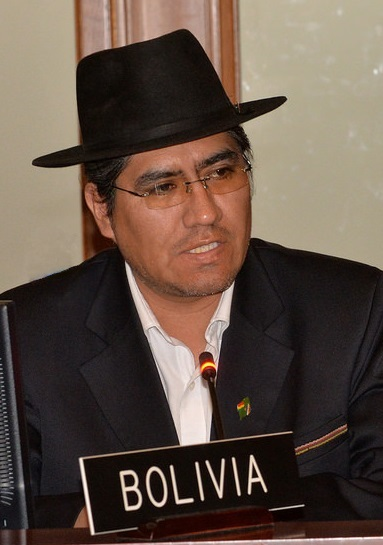
- Diego Pary at the Organization of American States in 2017

Permanent Representative of Bolivia to the United Nations
- Incumbent
- Assumed office 19 November 2020
- President: Luis Arce
- Preceded by: Rubén Dario Cuellar

Minister of Foreign Affairs
- In office 4 September 2018 – 12 November 2019
- President: Evo Morales; Jeanine Áñez
- Preceded by: Fernando Huanacuni Mamani
- Succeeded by: Karen Longaric

Ambassador of Bolivia to the Organization of American States
- In office 9 May 2011 – 4 September 2018
- President: Evo Morales
- Preceded by: José Enrique Pinelo
- Succeeded by: José Alberto Gonzales

Personal details
- Born: 1977 (age 48–49) Potosí Department, Bolivia
- Party: MAS-IPSP
- Education: University of Saint Francis Xavier
- Occupation: Quechua indigenous leader, teacher, diplomat and politician

Diego Pary Rodríguez is a Bolivian Quechua indigenous leader, educator, politician and diplomat. He served as Advisor to the Bolivian Constituent Assembly of 2006-07 and as Vice Minister of Higher Education. From 2011 to 2018 he served as Ambassador of Bolivia to the Organization of American States (OAS) and Concurrent Ambassador of Bolivia to Trinidad and Tobago, Jamaica, Dominica and The Bahamas. He was Foreign Minister of Bolivia from 2018 until 12 November 2019, following the resignation of Evo Morales.

== Biography ==
Pary began his primary education in 1983 in his community's rural school. In 1987, at 10 years old, Diego was forced to move to the town of Caiza D to continue his secondary education. Diego gained his secondary degree from the Colegio Pablo VI in 1995. In 1996, he moved to Sucre to continue his professional studies, attending the Universidad Mayor Real y Pontificia de San Francisco Xavier de Chuquisaca. He graduated with a degree in education in 2001. To continue his academic career, he completed expert studies in indigenous people, human rights, public administration, and international cooperation at the Charles III University of Madrid in 2008 and a Masters in International Commercial Negotiations at the University of Barcelona and Simón Bolivar Andes University in 2014-2015.

== Career ==
Pary began a career in education while the university was still a place of privilege that was often difficult to access. He was noted for his identification with indigenous peoples, and thus assumed different positions of student leadership in the university. In 2002, having concluded his career at university, Pary began to train community leaders, people's reporters, union leaders, mayors, and councilors through the Fundación Acción Cultural Loyola (Loyola Cultural Action Foundation, ACLO), who currently hold various positions within the Bolivian state. In 2005 and 2006, along with indigenous organizations of the Pact of Unity and other professionals, Pary worked on the development of the "Proposal of the Indigenous, Native, Agricultural and Colonizing Organizations to the Constituent Assembly."

In 2006, he joined as a member and advisor to the Unified Syndical Confederation of Rural Workers of Bolivia (CSUTCB) and the Syndical Confederation of Intercultural Communities (CSCIB). Also in 2006, he became a permanent advisor to the Constituent Assembly as a representative of the Pacto de Unidad, participating actively in the entire process of drafting the new Political Constitution of Bolivia. During his years with the Constituent Assembly, he also participated in several international forums and received support from indigenous leaders in Ecuador, Argentina, Colombia, Peru, Venezuela, Uruguay, Brazil, as well as political leaders in South Africa. Later, to continue working in the field of indigenous rights, he joined the Indigenous People's Development Fund of Latin America and the Caribbean (Fondo para el Desarrollo de los Pueblos Indígenas de América Latina y El Cariba, FILAC). as a Coordinator of the Indigenous Intercultural University and member of the Indigenous Chair.

In November 2008, he became the Vice Minister of Superior Education in Bolivia. In his time in this position, he created the three Indigenous Universities of Bolivia (UNIBOL) and the Plurinational System of Competency Certification, and transformed the Teachers' Training Schools. He also strengthened technical and technological training, creating new institutions in these fields. In addition he created the Artistic Training Schools and in cooperation with member nations of Mercosur promoted university accreditation, even the creation of the Plurinational Agency of Evaluation and Accreditation of Superior University Education of Bolivia.

=== Ambassador of Bolivia to the OAS (2011–2018) ===
In 2011, Pary was named Ambassador of Bolivia to the Organization of American States (OAS) and Concurrent Ambassador of Bolivia to Trinidad and Tobago, Jamaica, Dominica and The Bahamas. At the OAS, he took on different leadership roles: President and Vice President of the Permanent Council, President of the Interamerican Council for Comprehensive Development, President of the Indigenous Peoples Workgroup, President of the Agenda Subcommission and President of the Declaration of Cochabamba Workgroup.

=== Foreign Minister of Bolivia (2018–2019) ===
On 4 September 2018, Pary was appointed as Minister of Foreign Affairs of Bolivia replacing Fernando Huanacuni Mamani. On 11 November 2019, he submitted his resignation following the accusations of fraud in the 20 October 2019 Bolivian elections.

=== Flight and Return to Bolivia ===
After the fall of the Morales administration, Pary fled to Nicaragua where he remained until early 2020. He was initially tipped as a potential Presidential candidate for MAS in the upcoming 2020 Bolivian general election. Eventually, former Minister of Economy Luis Arce was nominated as a candidate and elected president.

On 19 November 2020, the Chamber of Senators named Pary Ambassador of Bolivia to the United Nations.

Diplomatic posts
Preceded by José Enrique Pinelo	Bolivian Ambassador to the Organisation of American States; 2011–2018	Succeeded by José Alberto Gonzales
Preceded by Rubén Dario Cuellar	Permanent Representative of Bolivia to the United Nations; 2020–present	Incumbent
Political offices
Preceded by Fernando Huanacuni Mamani	Minister of Foreign Affairs; 2018–2019	Succeeded by Karen Longaric
