= Achacachi =

Achacachi Jach'ak'achi
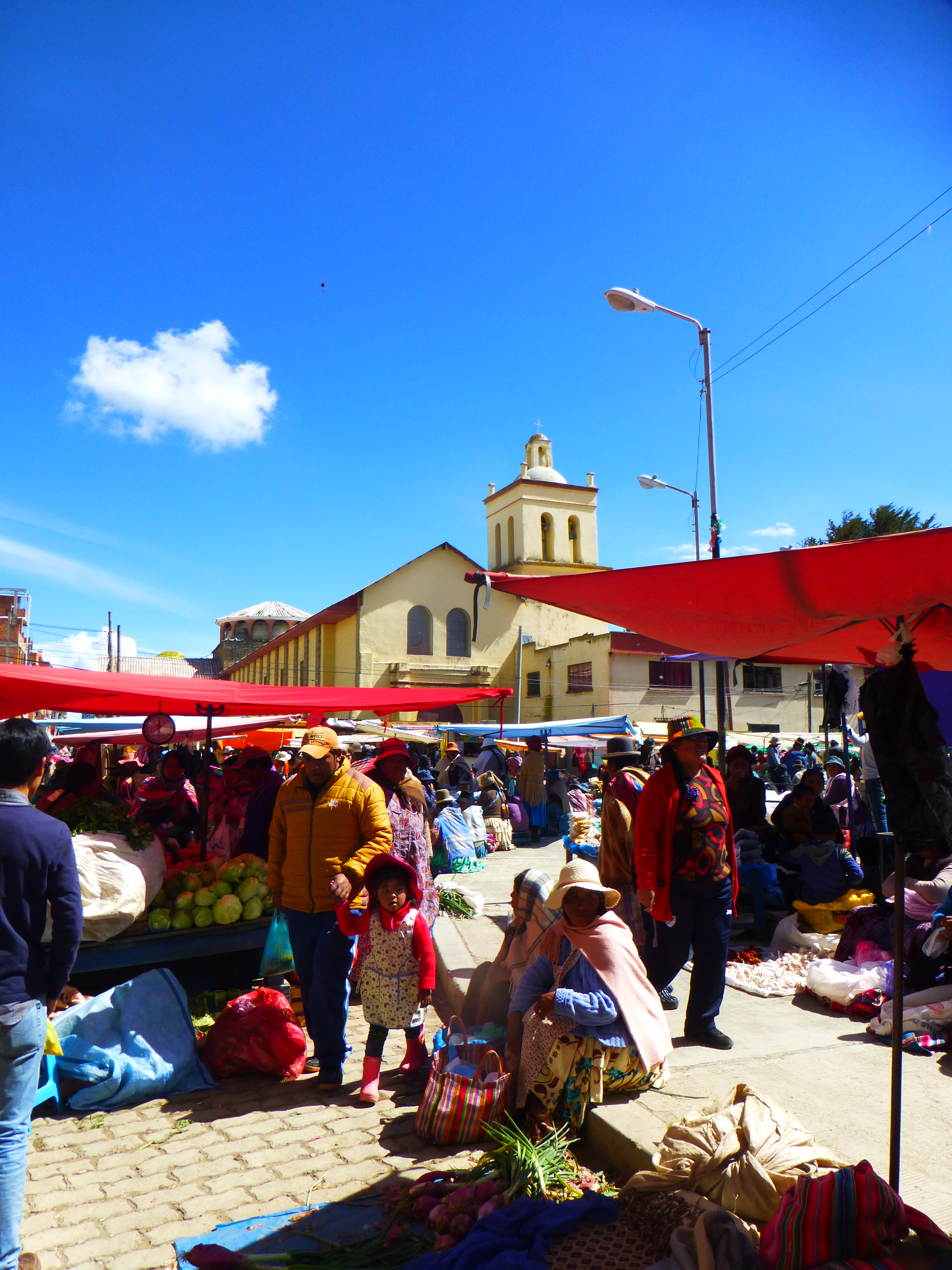
- Market in Achacachi

- Location in Bolivia
- Coordinates: 16°02′40″S 68°41′06″W
- Country: Bolivia
- Admin. division: La Paz Department
- Province: Omasuyos Province
- Municipality: Achacachi Municipality
- Elevation: 3,854 m (12,644 ft)

Population (2012 census)
  - Total: 8,857
  - Ethnicities: Aymara
- Time zone: UTC-4 (BOT)
- Area code: (+591) 2
- Climate: ET
- Website: www.achacachi.com

Achacachi is a town on the Altiplano plateau in the South American Andes in the La Paz Department in Bolivia. It is the capital of the Omasuyos Province.

== History of Achacachi ==
Achacachi, as an establishment, existed before the arrival of the Spaniards, as shown by descriptions that were made on "cronicas" and "relaciones" (official papers written by authorities) by royal or ecclesiastical Spanish authorities. Achacachi was the capital of a colla "señorio" called Pacasa, in the "Umasuyus" (from Aymara: "shore side") region, which was located alongside the East of Lake Intikjarka (Titicaca) in the Peru-Bolivian plateau.

== Location ==
Achacachi is at an elevation of 3,854 m or 12.647 feet amsl on the Achacachi peninsula on the eastern shores of Lake Titicaca, 96 km (60 mi) northwest of the capital La Paz.

== Notable people ==
- Juan Vargas Aruquipa, Catholic Bishop of Coroico
- Jaime Escalante, mathematician, educator

== Partner city ==
- Rome, Italy

== Climate ==
Climate data for Achacachi (Belen), elevation 3,833 m (12,575 ft)
| Month | Jan | Feb | Mar | Apr | May | Jun | Jul | Aug | Sep | Oct | Nov | Dec | Year |
|---|---|---|---|---|---|---|---|---|---|---|---|---|---|
| Mean daily maximum °C (°F) | 14.5 (58.1) | 14.6 (58.3) | 15.0 (59.0) | 15.3 (59.5) | 14.8 (58.6) | 13.7 (56.7) | 13.4 (56.1) | 14.2 (57.6) | 14.6 (58.3) | 15.8 (60.4) | 15.9 (60.6) | 15.3 (59.5) | 14.8 (58.6) |
| Daily mean °C (°F) | 9.0 (48.2) | 9.0 (48.2) | 8.8 (47.8) | 7.6 (45.7) | 5.5 (41.9) | 3.9 (39.0) | 3.6 (38.5) | 4.9 (40.8) | 6.7 (44.1) | 8.2 (46.8) | 8.7 (47.7) | 9.2 (48.6) | 7.1 (44.8) |
| Mean daily minimum °C (°F) | 3.6 (38.5) | 3.4 (38.1) | 2.7 (36.9) | 0.0 (32.0) | −3.8 (25.2) | −5.9 (21.4) | −6.1 (21.0) | −4.4 (24.1) | −1.2 (29.8) | 0.6 (33.1) | 1.5 (34.7) | 3.1 (37.6) | −0.5 (31.0) |
| Average precipitation mm (inches) | 96.7 (3.81) | 72.2 (2.84) | 58.5 (2.30) | 22.3 (0.88) | 15.7 (0.62) | 8.0 (0.31) | 6.5 (0.26) | 11.2 (0.44) | 22.3 (0.88) | 31.2 (1.23) | 42.0 (1.65) | 74.0 (2.91) | 460.6 (18.13) |
| Average precipitation days | 16.8 | 13.6 | 11.1 | 5.6 | 3.9 | 2.0 | 1.9 | 2.6 | 5.7 | 6.8 | 8.2 | 13 | 91.2 |
| Average relative humidity (%) | 76.9 | 77.3 | 76.6 | 70.2 | 62.1 | 60.9 | 60.4 | 61.7 | 64.2 | 64.8 | 66.9 | 71.8 | 67.8 |
Source: Servicio Nacional de Meteorología e Hidrología de Bolivia
