= Q'ara Qullu =

Mountain in Bolivia

- Location within Bolivia

Highest point
- Elevation: 4,956 m (16,260 ft)
- Coordinates: 15°56′54″S 68°32′45″W

Geography
- Location: Bolivia, La Paz Department, Omasuyos Province
- Parent range: Andes

Q'ara Qullu (Aymara q'ara bare, bald, qullu mountain, "bare mountain", also spelled Khara Khollu, Khara Kkollu) is a 4,956-metre-high (16,260 ft) mountain in the Andes of Bolivia. It is situated in the La Paz Department, Omasuyos Province, Achacachi Municipality. Q'ara Qullu lies south of Janq'u Uma and Janq'u K'ark'a of the Cordillera Real. San Francisco Lake is at its feet, east of it.
