= Q'ara Qullu (Ancoraimes) =

Mountain in Bolivia

- Location within Bolivia

Highest point
- Elevation: 4,516 m (14,816 ft)
- Coordinates: 15°50′05″S 68°48′10″W

Geography
- Location: Bolivia; La Paz Department, Omasuyos Province, Ancoraimes Municipality
- Parent range: Andes

Q'ara Qullu (Aymara q'ara bare, bald, qullu mountain, "bare mountain", also spelled Khara Kkollu) is a 4,516 m (14,816 ft) mountain in the Bolivian Andes. It is located in the La Paz Department, Omasuyos Province, Ancoraimes Municipality. Q'ara Qullu lies northwest of the village of Surijaya.
