= Achacachi Municipality =

- Municipality
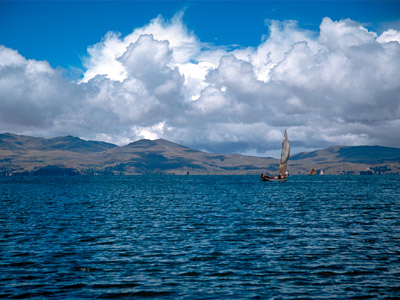
- Lake Wiñaymarka, the southern part of Lake Titicaca

- Location of the Achacachi Municipality within Bolivia
- Coordinates: 16°5′0″S 68°40′0″W
- Country: Bolivia
- Department: La Paz Department
- Province: Omasuyos Province
- Seat: Achacachi

Government
  - Mayor: Constancio Gutierrez
  - President: Bernabé Paucara Bautista (2007)

Area
  - Total: 414 sq mi (1,072 km^{2})
- Elevation: 12,543 ft (3,823 m)

Population (2001)
  - Total: 70,503
  - Ethnicities: Aymara
- Time zone: UTC-4 (BOT)
- Website: http://www.achacachi.gob.bo/index.php

Achacachi Municipality is one of six municipalities of the Omasuyos Province in the La Paz Department in Bolivia. Its seat is Achacachi.

The municipality is situated in the northern Altiplano of the Bolivian Andes region on the eastern shore of Lake Titicaca bordered to the north by the Larecaja Province, to the east by the Los Andes Province, to the south-east by the Huarina Municipality, to the west by the Santiago de Huata Municipality, to the south by the Huatajata Municipality and Chúa Cocani Municipality (these four municipalities were cantons of the Achacachi Municipality until 2005, 2009, and 2010, respectively), to the south-west by Lake Wiñaymarka and the northern part of Lake Titicaca, and to the north-west by the Ancoraimes Municipality.

== Population ==
The people are predominantly indigenous citizens of Aymara descent (95.04%).

== See also ==
- Janq'u K'ark'a
- Q'ara Qullu
- Wari Qalluni Pata
