= Training workshop =

Type of interactive training

A training workshop is a type of interactive training, educational programme or learning environment that is rich in materials and intended for a group of people. The focus self-directed learning or reflection on experience. A practical approach is taken and the groups needs and (or) interests are addressed. Participants in such a workshop carry out a number of training activities rather than passively listen to a lecture or presentation. Broadly, two types of workshops exist: A general workshop is put on for a mixed audience, and a closed workshop is tailored towards meeting the training needs of a specific group. General or closed training workshops have multiple formats. This includes classroom training, development programmes that are produced in-house, courses and programmes that are offered externally, experiential learning and coaching / mentorship Those who are responsible for Training Workshops will often use the ADDIE model as a framework to guide their process.

1. Training needs analysis
2. Training programme design
3. Training materials development
4. Training intervention
5. Training analysis
