= 2019–2020 Mexico–Bolivia diplomatic crisis =

The 2019–2020 Mexico–Bolivia diplomatic crisis began on 29 October 2019 when the Mexican government congratulated incumbent Bolivian President Evo Morales for his reelection victory. After the election, a preliminary report by the Organization of American States on 9 November reported numerous irregularities in the election, and amid protests and pressure from the Bolivian armed forces and police, Morales was forced to resign.

== Background ==
Morales and two cabinet members were flown to Mexico, where they were granted political asylum. After Mexico granted asylum to leaders of the Movement for Socialism (MAS), Mexican President Andrés Manuel López Obrador called Morales's resignation a coup d'etat and refused to recognize the new government of Jeanine Áñez. A month later Morales moved to Argentina, and the Áñez government issued an arrest warrant for him.

Coupled with the claim that Morales was carrying out acts of terrorism and sedition during his asylum, Bolivia claims that Mexico was in violation of the UN Declaration on Territorial Asylum which says that “States granting asylum shall not allow persons who have received asylum to engage in activities contrary to the purposes and principles of the United Nations". Mexico is also accused of violating internal norms of the Community of Latin American and Caribbean States (CELAC) and of violating the Mexican Estrada Doctrine concerning respect for the self-determination of peoples and non-intervention in governments or changes of governments in other nationals.

Nine members of the Morales administration have taken refuge in the Mexican embassy in La Paz since 10 November. According to El País, these are ex-ministers Juan Ramón Quintana, Javier Zavaleta, Héctor Arce, César Navarro, Wilma Alanoca and Hugo Moldiz, in addition to the former governor of Oruro Víctor Vasquez, former deputy minister Pedro Dorado, and former director of the Agency of Electronic Government and Information and Communication Technologies (AGETIC), Nicolás Laguna. Interior Minister Arturo Murillo has said repeatedly that Quintana will not be allowed to leave the country, and will be imprisoned. Quintana is charged with sedition, terrorism, and terrorist financing; four other asylum seekers also have arrest warrants issued against them.

The Permanent Mission of Mexico in the OAS detailed in a letter that, since 21 December, about 150 Bolivian police and intelligence officials have been observed from the official residence. Mexican Foreign Minister Marcelo Ebrard announced he would take the dispute to the International Criminal Court. In response, Murillo defended the step up in security by saying "Obviously, our duty is to take care of the residence of diplomats and also take care of people's lives, no matter how criminal they are or what relations they have with the State." Anti-Morales protesters have routinely gathered at the embassy to demand that they be turned over to the authorities. Murillo stated that the Mexican ambassador herself asked for extra security, on three separate occasions, because of threats to burn the embassy complex and lynch Quintana. In response to the threat of being taken to the International Criminal Court, he said that Bolivia can prove that it is Mexico that has violated the treaties.

== Spanish visit to Mexican embassy ==
On 27 December 2019, diplomats from Spain paid a courtesy visit to the Mexican embassy in La Paz and were delayed in their departure due to the detention of vehicles that were to pick them up from that location. According to the Bolivian Foreign Ministry, the Spanish diplomats arrived at the residence of Mexico with "people with their faces covered", who "tried to enter surreptitiously and clandestinely" into the compound. It was later claimed that these were members of the Spanish Special Group of Operations (GEO). The Mexican ambassador accused the Bolivian government of María Teresa Mercado of violating the Vienna Convention on Diplomatic Relations. Longaric responded by saying the presence of masked and armed guards aroused suspicion that there would be an attempt to smuggle Quintana from the Embassy to another location. "No country in the world could tolerate what happened last Friday. In that case, the Vienna Convention empowers the host State to declare those diplomats who violate the rules of the conventions themselves personae non gratae" Longaric said. Former President Jorge Quiroga also questioned the presence of the masked figures and asked that the Prime Minister of Spain, Pedro Sánchez, apologize for the incident. Bolivia formally proclaimed the Mexican ambassador persona non grata and gave her 72 hours to leave the country and Mexico officially recalled its ambassador. Mexico’s Foreign Ministry assured its 8,000 to 10,000 citizens living in Bolivia that it is prepared to protect their interests.

On December 30, Interior Minister Olga Sánchez Cordero said that Mexico has no intention of breaking diplomatic relations with Bolivia. On 2 January, AMLO reiterated that Mexico would not relinquish the asylees to the Bolivian government.

On 2 January, representatives of the European Union met with foreign minister Karen Longaric. Deputy head of the European Union delegation, Jörg Schreiber, described his talks with Longaric as "open and constructive" and the relationship with the interim government as "very good". Longaric said that she had the understanding and support of the ambassadors from the EU concerning the events at the Embassy and they expressed support for the interim government's mission towards new elections.

The results of a Spanish parliamentary investigation into the incident were released on February 27, 2020. In the report, the Spanish government accuses the Bolivian government of putting the safety of its diplomats at risk and that the four Bolivian police officers involved were not interested in resolving the conflict. This is the first time that the Spanish government has criticized Bolivia directly, despite the expulsion of three Bolivian diplomats. The report emphasizes that Bolivia is un país hermano ("a brother country") and that they hope Bolivia is willing to maintain bilateral relations.

== Reactions ==
The decision to grant asylum to Evo Morales provoked Twitter hashtags #BienvenidoEvo and #EvoElMundoEstaContigo among supporters in Mexico, while opponents tweeted #EvoNoEresBienvenidoEnMexico. Mexico City Mayor Claudia Sheinbaum welcomed Morales, tweeting "Mexico is an inclusive and supportive nation, whose doors open to those who have had the need to leave their countries" while conservatives such as former president Vicente Fox and 2018 presidential candidate Margarita Zavala criticized the decision to grant asylum to Morales. The media have also been split on the decision.

Following the expulsion of ambassador María Teresa Mercado, former Mexican president Felipe Calderón tweeted "The conflict with Bolivia has gone too far. I worry about the lack of traditional impartiality of the Mexican diplomatic corps". Senator Citlalli Hernández (Morena) and Deputy Mario Martín Delgado (Morena) expressed their support for ambassador Mercado. Speaking on behalf of the Party of the Democratic Revolution, Ángel Ávila said Mexico should expel Bolivian diplomats. Marko Antonio Cortés Mendoza, president of PAN, said the conflict is the result of an "improvised and inconsistent" foreign policy.

On 30 December 2019, the Spanish government said it "flatly rejects" the Bolivian suggestion that it has interfered in Bolivia's internal affairs and calls the decision to expel three diplomats a "hostile gesture." In reciprocity, they gave three Bolivian diplomats 72 hours to leave Spain. The three diplomats being expelled by Spain, hired under the Morales administration, were identified as the chargé d'affaires, Luis Quispe Condori, the military attache, Marcelo Vargas Barral and the police attache, Orso Fernando Oblitas Siles. The MAS heads of the Senate and Chamber of Deputies, Mónica Eva Copa and Sergio Choque, have also been critical of the handling of the situation, with Copa characterising the decision of Áñez as "unfortunate", because Spain helped to pacify the country after Morales resigned. "We hope that Áñez can rethink her position," said Copa, "this position only causes damage to the country."

On 31 December, the European Union expressed a desire for the situation to be deescalated as soon as possible and said that "the expulsion of diplomatic officials is an extreme and unfriendly measure that must be reserved for serious situations. Full respect for the Vienna Convention on Diplomatic Relations and dialogue are essential to reduce tension." On 1 January, the Bolivian government promised to supply more information about the incident, stating that "Bolivia wishes to overcome this impasse as soon as possible and maintain close relations with the Kingdom of Spain, within the framework of traditional respect and friendship that have always characterized them." The expulsions do not extend beyond those designated personae non gratae and Mexico named Ana Luisa Vallejo as Mercado's replacement. The Bolivian diplomats will similarly be replaced with the role of chargé d'affaires being filled by Gualberto Rodríguez San Martín.

On 2 January, Bolivia's interim foreign minister, Karen Longaric said she hoped to meet with her Mexican counterpart, Marcelo Ebrard, in a neutral country to solve the conflict. At the same time, she insisted that the asylees, particularly Juan Ramón Quintana, be turned over to the Bolivian government. Meanwhile, Vox, a Spanish right-wing party, is investigating ties between Pablo Iglesias, the leftist leader of Podemos, and the government of former Bolivian president Evo Morales, as well as the current conflict involving Spanish diplomats. Their representatives, headed by MEP Hermann Tertsch, met with interior minister Arturo Murillo and defence minister Fernando López to review evidence of payments between members of the Morales administration and Podemos. Tertsch made a statement asking that Mexico reconsider its position on the asylees as Quintana is one of those heavily implicated as being involved.

At the petition of the government of President Luis Arce, María Teresa Mercado, who was the Mexican ambassador to Bolivia at the time of the incident, was reappointed ambassador of Mexico to Bolivia on January 28, 2021.

== See also ==
- 2019 Bolivian protests
- 2019 Bolivian general election
- 2019 Bolivian political crisis
- Presidency of Andrés Manuel López Obrador
