= Ancoraimes =

Ancoraimes Janq'ulaymi
- Town
- Location within Bolivia
- Coordinates: 15°54′S 68°54′W
- Country: Bolivia
- Department: La Paz Department
- Province: Omasuyos Province
- Municipality: Ancoraimes Municipality

Population (2001)
  - Total: 561
  - Ethnicities: Aymara
- Time zone: UTC-4 (BOT)
- Climate: Cwc

Ancoraimes (Janq'ulaymi; Aymara for "white branch") is a location in the La Paz Department in Bolivia. It is the seat of the Ancoraimes Municipality, the second municipal section of the Omasuyos Province.
