= Ancoraimes Municipality =

Ancoraimes Janq'u Laymi
- Municipality
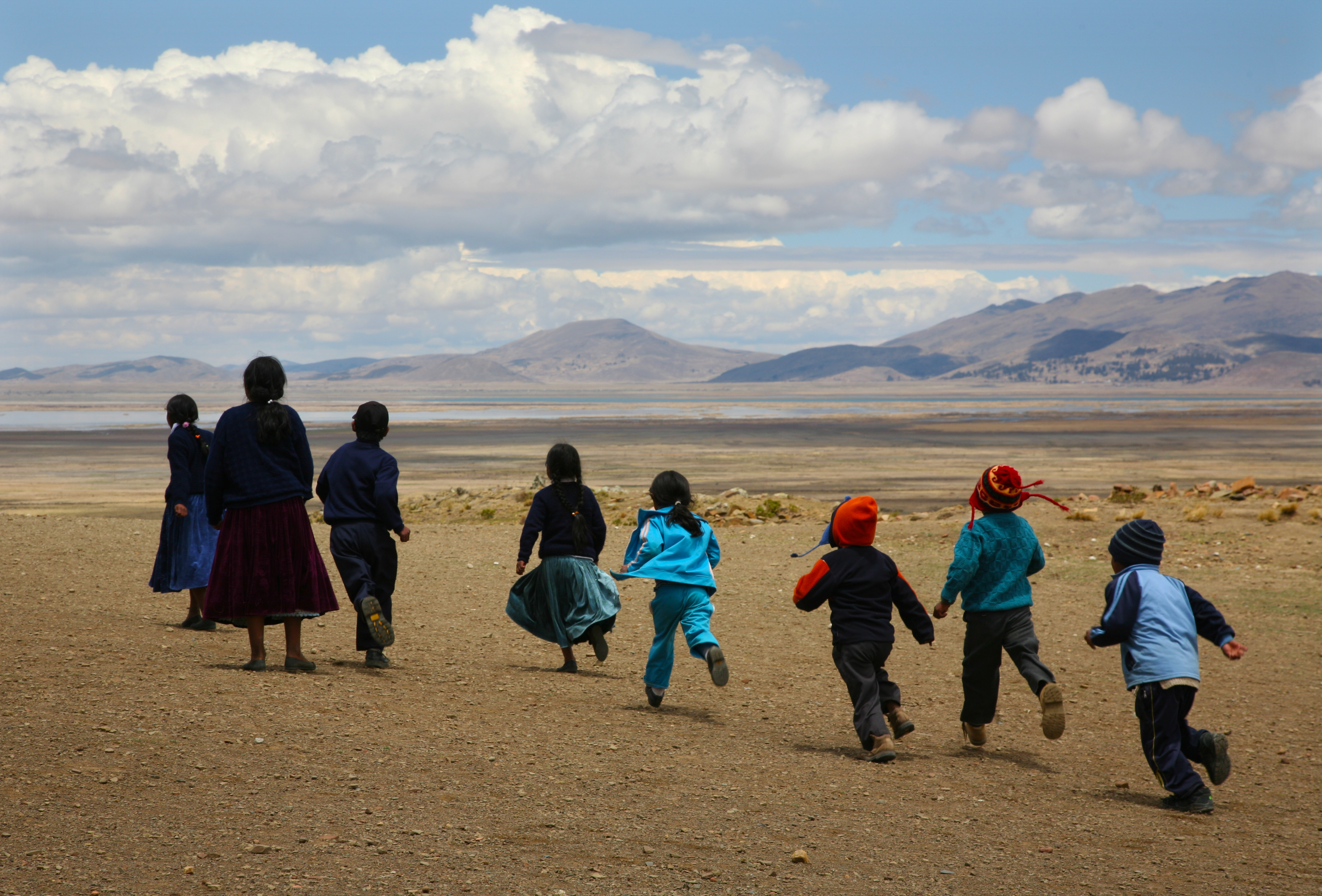
- Children play outside school in the community of Maquilaya, Ancoraimes Municipality.

- Location of the Ancoraimes Municipality within Bolivia
- Ancoraimes Municipality and its local surroundings
- Coordinates: 15°50′0″S 68°50′0″W
- Country: Bolivia
- Department: La Paz
- Province: Omasuyos
- Seat: Ancoraimes

Government
  - Mayor: Freddy Quinteros Huanca (ASLP, 2026)

Area
  - Municipality: 335 km^{2} (129 sq mi)
- Elevation: 3,900 m (12,800 ft)

Population (2024)
  - Municipality: 16,953
  - Density: 51/km^{2} (130/sq mi)
  - Rural: 16,953
  - Indigenous ethnicities: Aymara: 13,408 (79%); Unspecified Indigenous: 1,642 (10%)
- 2024 Bolivian census
- Time zone: UTC-4 (BOT)
- Geocode: 020202 (INE code); BO020202 (OCHA P-code)

Ancoraimes (Aymara: Janq'u Laymi) is the second municipal section of the Omasuyos Province in the La Paz Department, Bolivia. Its seat is Ancoraimes (Janq'u Laymi).

== Geography ==
Some of the highest mountains of the district are listed below:

- Chiwanqu
- Ch'amaka Misa
- Ch'umani
- Inkawi
- Jach'a Pata
- Jach'a P'iq'iñ Q'ara
- Jichu Qullu
- Kimsa Chatani
- Muru Qullu
- Paqu Juqhu
- Pinkilluni
- Pukara
- Pukarani
- P'iq'iñ Q'ara
- Qala Qala
- Qutu Uma Qullu
- Q'ara Qullu (Ancoraimes)
- Taypi K'ark'a
- Wila Sirka
- Wisk'achani

== Communities ==
The following communities are located within the municipality:

- Ancoraimes
- Centro Belen
- Ispaya Este
- Llojllata Grande
- Llojllata Laimini
- Llojllata Tomuyo Norte
- Turrini Alta
- Zamora
- Ispaya Grande
- Ispaya Tocoli
- Ispaya Luquimbaya
- Pacharia
- Lojrocachi Sur
- Turrini Centro
- Turrini Baja
- Lojrocachi Norte
- Chacasia
- Camajhuacha
- Cancahuani
- Chontamarca
- Corpa Pampa
- Maca Maca
- Pacoma Grande
- Sur Calamarca
- Sunturuta
- Tintaya Macamaca
- Chuñuña Norte
- Villa Maca Maca
- Cheje Pampa
- Cheje Pampa Bajo
- Maquelaya
- Corpa Grande
- Lugaraya
- Chinchaya
- Huanquisco Kanta
- Rincon Chejepampa
- Alto Chejepampa
- Chinchaya Norte
- Cohani
- Karkapata
- Apohoco
- Calahuancani Alta
- Machaca Uyupata
- Sotalaya Centro
- Pocoata Grande
- Sotalaya Norte
- Limancachi
- Sotalaya Este
- Pocoata Centro
- Huayrani
- Marca Pampa
- Sallca Pampa
- Villa Cajiata
- Morocollo
- Lacaya
- Camata Norte
- Camata Centro
- Camata Sur
- Azacilo
- Chiñaja
- Chojñapata
- Colani
- Inca Caturapi
- Patapatani Negruni
- Calahuancani Baja
- Quesuni
- Pulaya
- Pata Patani

== Cantons ==
The municipality consists of the following cantons:

- Ancoraimes Canton
- Villa Macamaca Canton
- Cheje Pampa Canton
- Sotalaya Canton
- Cajiata Canton
- Chojñapata Chiñaja Canton

== Demographics ==
Population pyramid 2024
%	Males	Age	Females	%
0.4		85+		0.6
0.8		80–84		1
1.4		75–79		1.6
1.9		70–74		2
2.2		65–69		2.5
2.9		60–64		2.8
2.9		55–59		3
3.1		50–54		3.4
3.1		45–49		3
3.3		40–44		3
3.4		35–39		2.7
3		30–34		2.8
3.3		25–29		3.3
3		20–24		3
3.3		15–19		3.5
4.7		10–14		4.5
4.4		5–9		4.5
3		0–4		2.9
- Source: 2024 Bolivian Census

Population in Recent Censuses
2001	2012	2024
15,199	13,136	16,953

=== Languages and Indigenous identification ===
Ethnic identification (2024)
Group	Population	%
Aymara	13,408	79.1%
Campesino	732	4.3%
Indígena	624	3.7%
Unspecified Indigenous	240	1.4%
Source: 2024 Bolivian Census

Languages spoken
Language	2024 speakers	2024 %	2012 speakers	2012 %
Aymara	13,787	81.3%	11,054	84.2%
Spanish	12,943	76.3%	8,379	63.8%
Source: 2024 Bolivian Census

== Government ==
The Mayor of Ancoraimes is Freddy Quinteros Huanca, who was elected in the March 2026 elections.

Ancoraimes has a municipal council with seven seats, as do all municipalities with populations between 15,001 and 50,000.

Seat	Type	Name	Party / Political Organization
1	Member	Eva Alarcón Ramos	VENCEREMOS
1	Alternate	Rubén Averanga Ramos	VENCEREMOS
2	Member	Walter Castillo Añaguaya	MTS
2	Alternate	Olivia Quispe Cancari	MTS
3	Member	Nelson Canaza Luque	MTS
3	Alternate	Virginia Mamani Titirico	MTS
4	Member	Franz Maquera Ticona	JALLALLA LP
4	Alternate	Bertha Paucara Coaquira	JALLALLA LP
5	Member	Mateo Pacha Quispe	ASLP
5	Alternate	TBD	ASLP
6	Member	Feliza Cutile Pérez	ASLP
6	Alternate	Gualberto Velasquéz Quispe	ASLP
7	Member	TBD	A-UPP
7	Alternate	Fernando Quispe Mamani	A-UPP
Source: Supreme Electoral Tribunal.
