= Huarina =

Huarina Warina
- Town
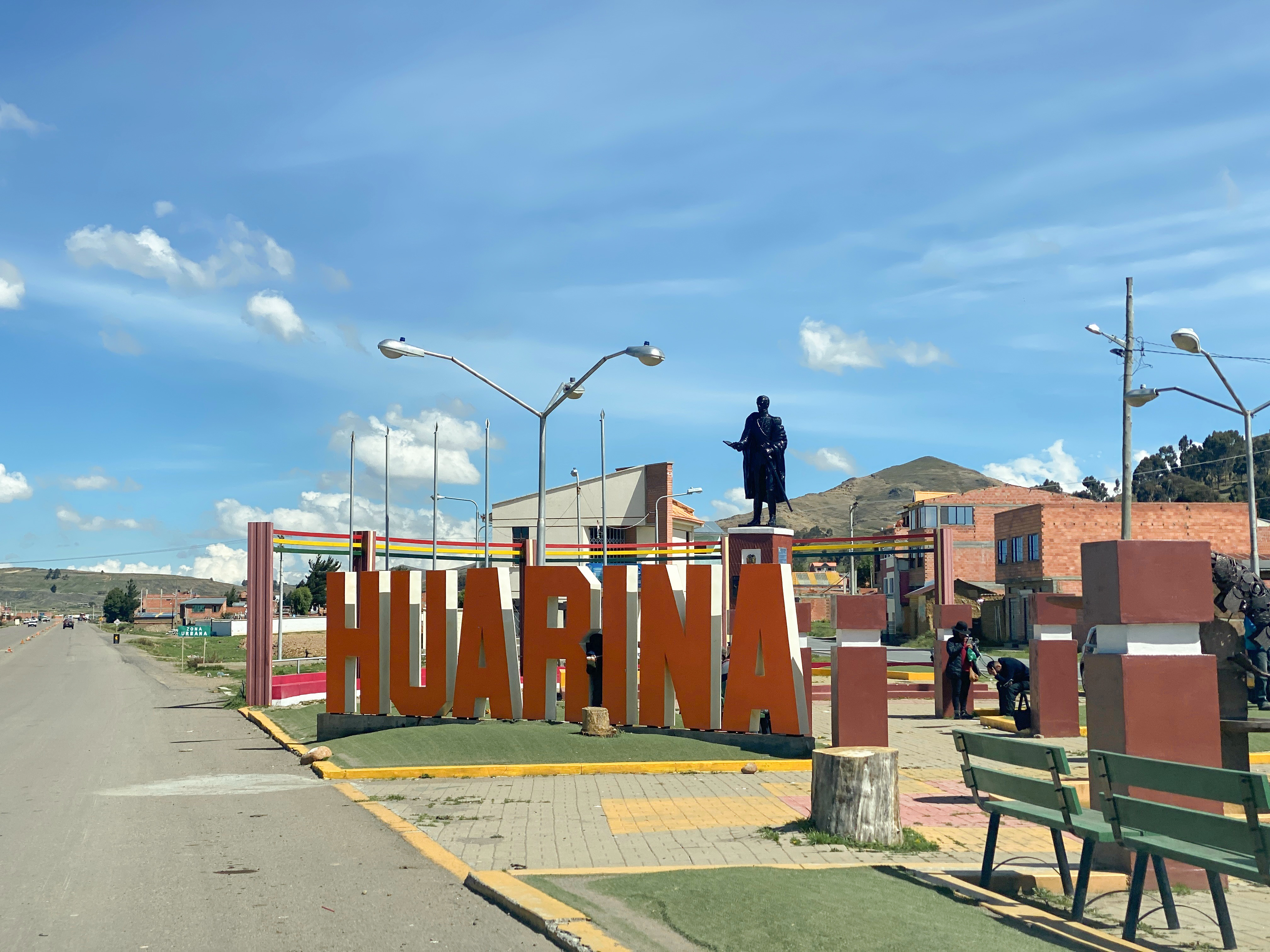
- Main square views from Bolivia's National Route 2

- Location within Bolivia
- Coordinates: 16°12′S 68°38′W
- Country: Bolivia
- Department: La Paz Department
- Province: Omasuyos Province
- Municipality: Huarina Municipality

Population (2001)
  - Total: 1,308
  - Ethnicities: Aymara
- Time zone: UTC-4 (BOT)

Huarina is a location in the La Paz Department in Bolivia. It is the seat of the Huarina Municipality, one of the four municipalities of the Omasuyos Province. President of Peru Andrés de Santa Cruz was born here.

== Climate ==
Climate data for Huarina (Huarina Cota Cota), elevation 3,838 m (12,592 ft), (1972–2011)
Month	Jan	Feb	Mar	Apr	May	Jun	Jul	Aug	Sep	Oct	Nov	Dec	Year
Mean daily maximum °C (°F)	14.9 (58.8)	15.1 (59.2)	15.3 (59.5)	15.5 (59.9)	15.2 (59.4)	14.2 (57.6)	14.1 (57.4)	15.0 (59.0)	15.7 (60.3)	16.5 (61.7)	16.7 (62.1)	16.1 (61.0)	15.4 (59.7)
Daily mean °C (°F)	9.6 (49.3)	9.6 (49.3)	9.4 (48.9)	8.4 (47.1)	6.4 (43.5)	4.9 (40.8)	4.6 (40.3)	5.8 (42.4)	7.3 (45.1)	8.8 (47.8)	9.5 (49.1)	9.8 (49.6)	7.8 (46.1)
Mean daily minimum °C (°F)	4.3 (39.7)	4.0 (39.2)	3.5 (38.3)	1.4 (34.5)	−2.4 (27.7)	−4.3 (24.3)	−5.0 (23.0)	−3.5 (25.7)	−1.1 (30.0)	1.0 (33.8)	2.4 (36.3)	3.4 (38.1)	0.3 (32.6)
Average precipitation mm (inches)	137.0 (5.39)	88.9 (3.50)	88.4 (3.48)	36.0 (1.42)	11.1 (0.44)	9.4 (0.37)	6.5 (0.26)	13.6 (0.54)	21.3 (0.84)	41.4 (1.63)	51.9 (2.04)	90.9 (3.58)	596.4 (23.49)
Average precipitation days	18.1	13.8	12.6	6.8	2.5	1.6	1.7	2.6	4.5	7.0	7.7	12.0	90.9
Average relative humidity (%)	74.7	74.9	74.4	69.5	57.8	57.8	56.8	56.2	59.4	61.8	64.4	69.8	64.8
Source: Servicio Nacional de Meteorología e Hidrología de Bolivia

Climate data for Huarina (Copancara), elevation 3,814 m (12,513 ft), (1990–2011)
Month	Jan	Feb	Mar	Apr	May	Jun	Jul	Aug	Sep	Oct	Nov	Dec	Year
Mean daily maximum °C (°F)	15.6 (60.1)	15.7 (60.3)	15.8 (60.4)	16.2 (61.2)	15.6 (60.1)	15.5 (59.9)	15.1 (59.2)	15.4 (59.7)	15.8 (60.4)	16.2 (61.2)	16.6 (61.9)	16.3 (61.3)	15.8 (60.5)
Daily mean °C (°F)	9.9 (49.8)	9.7 (49.5)	9.5 (49.1)	8.8 (47.8)	6.4 (43.5)	5.4 (41.7)	5.2 (41.4)	6.3 (43.3)	7.9 (46.2)	9.1 (48.4)	9.7 (49.5)	10.1 (50.2)	8.2 (46.7)
Mean daily minimum °C (°F)	4.3 (39.7)	3.8 (38.8)	3.2 (37.8)	1.5 (34.7)	−3.4 (25.9)	−4.7 (23.5)	−4.6 (23.7)	−2.8 (27.0)	0.1 (32.2)	2.0 (35.6)	2.7 (36.9)	3.9 (39.0)	0.5 (32.9)
Average precipitation mm (inches)	136.6 (5.38)	91.4 (3.60)	73.1 (2.88)	15.8 (0.62)	5.8 (0.23)	5.5 (0.22)	3.9 (0.15)	11.8 (0.46)	13.8 (0.54)	28.2 (1.11)	38.9 (1.53)	55.0 (2.17)	479.8 (18.89)
Average precipitation days	14.9	11.0	9.7	2.4	1.0	1.0	0.7	1.7	2.3	3.6	5.1	7.6	61
Average relative humidity (%)	72.7	70.6	67.8	62.2	56.1	58.4	56.5	59.8	59.0	59.8	64.7	67.6	62.9
Source: Servicio Nacional de Meteorología e Hidrología de Bolivia
