= Omasuyos Province =

Omasuyos Uma Suyu
- Province
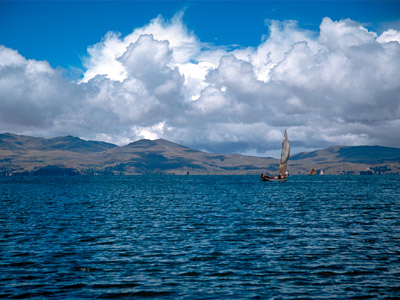
- Lake Wiñaymarka

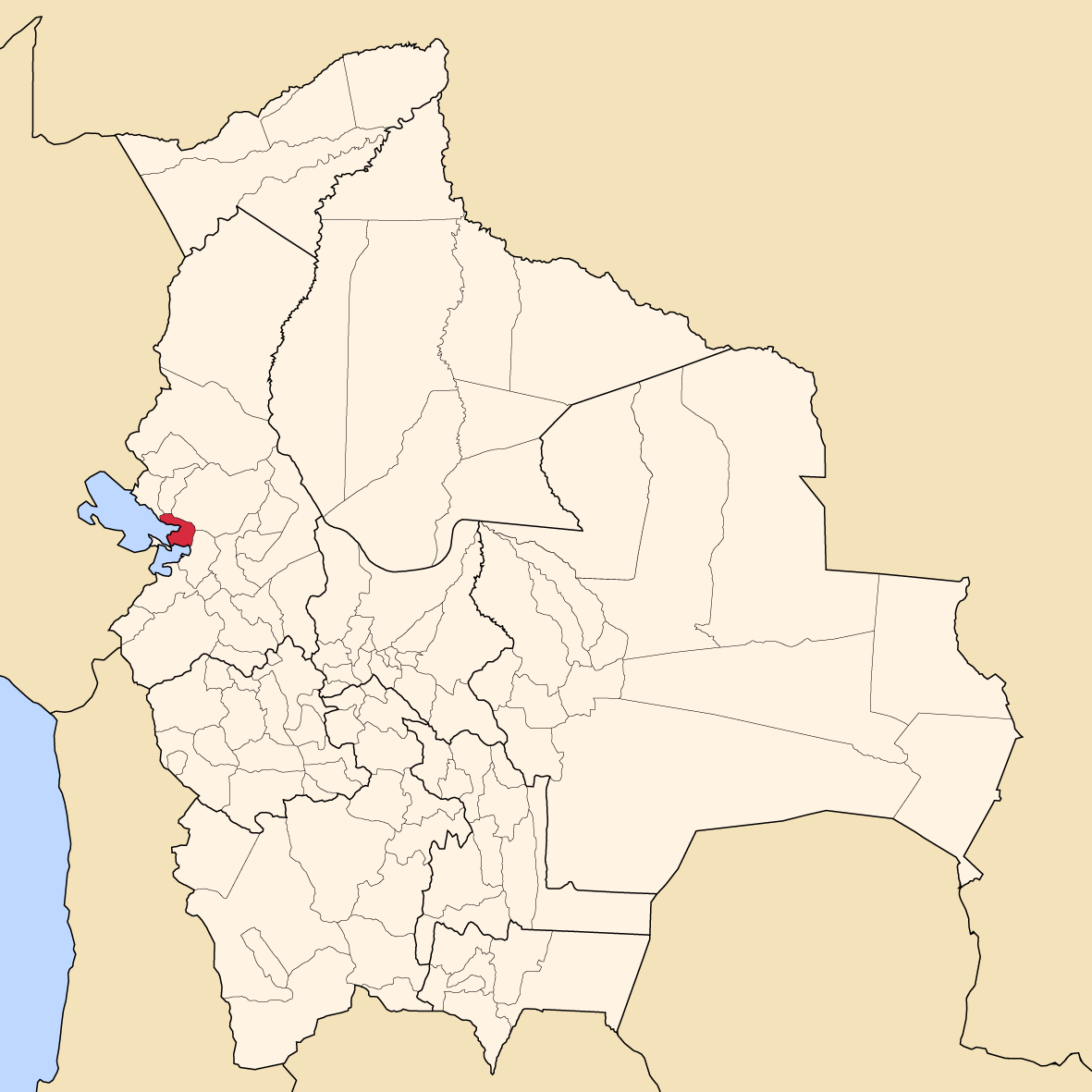
- Location of Omasuyos Province within Bolivia

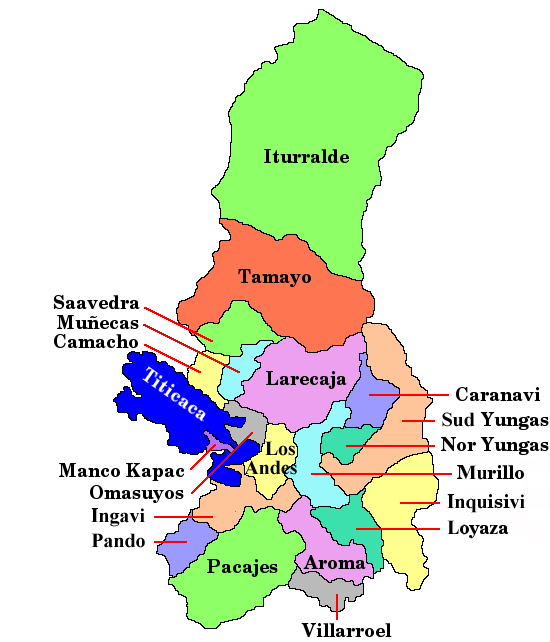
- Provinces of the La Paz Department
- Coordinates: 16°3′0″S 68°38′0″W
- Country: Bolivia
- Department: La Paz Department
- Municipalities: 4
- Capital: Achacachi

Area
  - Total: 2,065 km^{2} (797 sq mi)

Population (2024 census)
  - Total: 94,158
  - Density: 45.60/km^{2} (118.1/sq mi)
  - Ethnicities: Aymara
- Time zone: UTC-4 (BOT)
- Area code: BO.LP.FT
- Website: Official website

Omasuyos (Hispanicized spelling) or Uma Suyu (Aymara uma water, suyu region, "water region") is a province in the La Paz Department in Bolivia. Its capital is Achacachi (Jach'a Q'achi).

The province is situated in the Altiplano bordered to the north by the Muñecas Province, to the northeast by the Larecaja Province, to the southeast by the Los Andes Province, to the south and west by Lake Titicaca and to the northwest by the Eliodoro Camacho Province.

== Geography ==
The Cordillera Real traverses the province. Some of the highest mountains of the province are listed below:

- Chiwanqu
- Ch'amaka Misa
- Ch'umani
- Inkawi
- Jach'a Pata
- Jach'a P'iq'iñ Q'ara
- Janq'u K'ark'a
- Jichu Qullu
- Kimsa Chatani
- Muru Qullu
- Paqu Juqhu
- Pinkilluni
- Pukara
- Pukarani
- P'iq'iñ Q'ara
- Qala Qala
- Qutu Uma Qullu
- Q'ara Qullu (Achacachi)
- Q'ara Qullu (Ancoraimes)
- Taypi K'ark'a
- Wari Qalluni Pata
- Wila Sirka
- Wisk'achani

== Subdivision ==
The province is divided into six municipalities.

Municipality	Inhabitants (2001)	Inhabitants (2012)	Seat	Inhabitants (2001)
Achacachi	70,503	46,058	Achacachi	7,540
Huarina	(included in Achacachi in 2001)	7,948	Huarina	1,308
Santiago de Huata	(included in Achacachi in 2001)	8,562	Santiago de Huata	576
Huatajata	(included in Achacachi in 2001)	3,927	Huatajata	576
Chua Cocani	(included in Achacachi in 2001)	5,003	Chua Cocani	852
Ancoraimes	15,199	13,136	Ancoraimes	561

° including separated cantons

Huarina and Santiago de Huata, and Huatajata and Chua Cocani received the status of municipalities in 2005, 2009, and 2010, respectively. Formerly they were cantons of the Achacachi Municipality.

== Notable people ==
- Yola Mamani

== See also ==
- Ch'iyar Juqhu River
