= Vice President of Bolivia =

Second highest political office in Bolivia

Vice President of the Plurinational State of Bolivia
- Vicepresidente del Estado Plurinacional de Bolivia
- Coat of arms of Bolivia

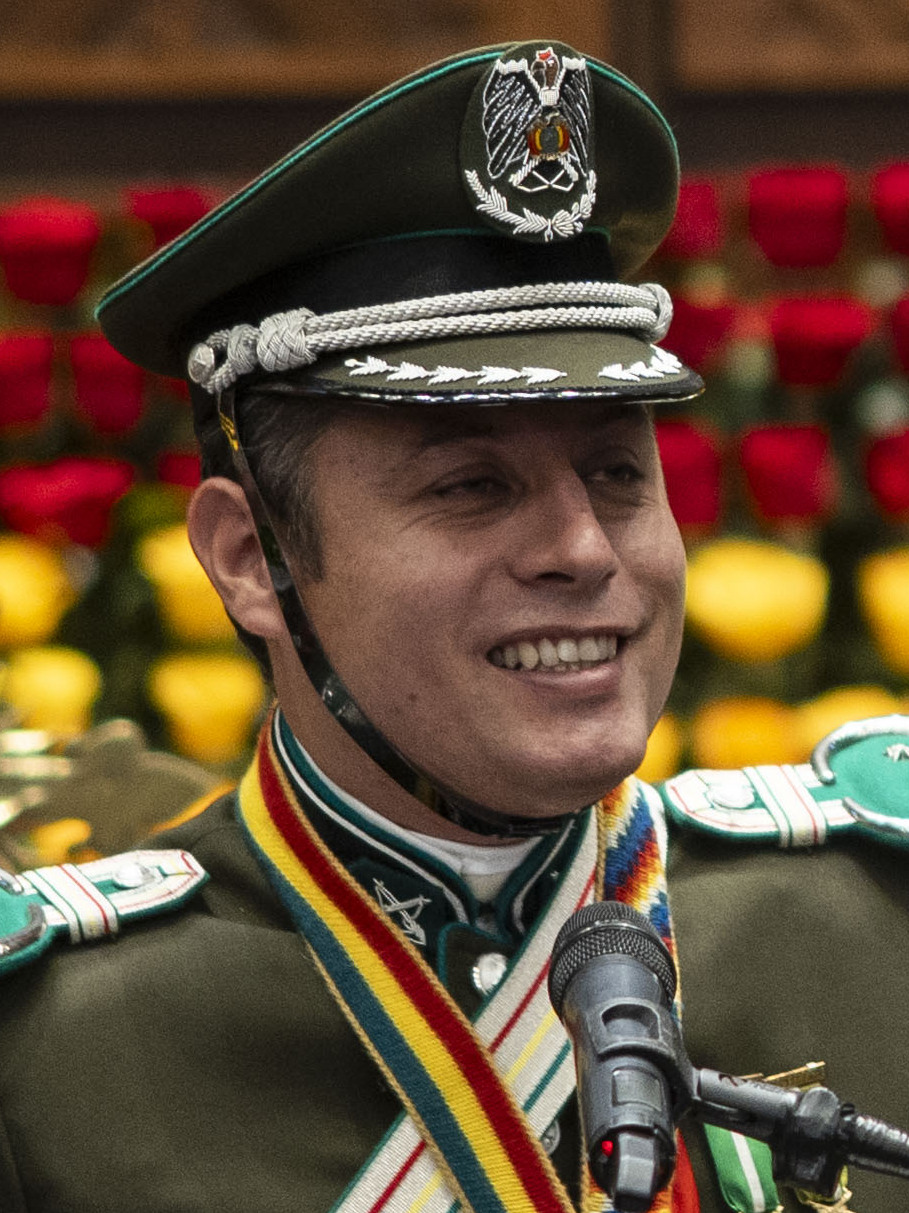
- Incumbent; Edmand Lara since 8 November 2025
- Residence: Vice Presidential Palace
- Seat: La Paz
- Nominator: Plurinational Electoral Organ
- Appointer: Direct popular vote (two rounds if necessary)
- Term length: Five years, renewable once
- Inaugural holder: José Ramón de Loayza
- Formation: 19 November 1826
- First holder: Álvaro García Linera (Note: While José Ramón de Loayza was the inaugural holder of the office of Vice President of Bolivia, Álvaro García Linera was the first Vice President of the Plurinational State of Bolivia in its current form.)
- Salary: 22,904 bolivianos per month
- Website: www.vicepresidencia.gob.bo

The vice president of Bolivia (Spanish: Vicepresidente de Bolivia), officially known as the vice president of the Plurinational State of Bolivia (Spanish: Vicepresidente del Estado Plurinacional de Bolivia), is the second highest political position in Bolivia. The vice president replaces the president in his definitive absence or others impediment and is the ex officio President of the Legislative Assembly.

Thirty-nine men have served as vice president of Bolivia since the office came into existence on 19 November 1826. José Ramón de Loayza was the first vice president of the Republic of Bolivia. The 38th vice president, Álvaro García Linera, was the last vice president of the Republic of Bolivia and the first vice president of the Plurinational State of Bolivia. There are currently five living former vice presidents. The most recent former vice president to die was Julio Garrett Ayllón on 19 March 2018.

Edmand Lara is the current vice president of Bolivia, having assumed office on 8 November 2025.

The vice president is the first person in the presidential line of succession and assumes the presidency if the president dies, resigns, or is impeached and removed from office. Four vice presidents have ascended to the presidency following the resignation of their predecessor (José Luis Tejada Sorzano, Mamerto Urriolagoitía, Jorge Qurioga, and Carlos Mesa). René Barrientos was the only vice president to assume the presidency by deposing his own predecessor, Víctor Paz Estenssoro. When Barrientos died suddenly on 27 April 1969, Luis Adolfo Siles Salinas became the only vice president to become president through their predecessor's death.

Seven former vice presidents (Aniceto Arce, Mariano Baptista, Severo Fernández, Eliodoro Villazón, Hernán Siles Zuazo, René Barrientos, and Jaime Paz Zamora) were elected president in their own right while two (José Miguel de Velasco and Mariano Enrique Calvo) became president by other means. José Miguel de Velasco was the only vice president who had already served as president (1828) prior to becoming vice president.

== Vice presidents ==
=== Republic of Bolivia (1826–1836) ===
The office of vice president was first established on 19 November 1826, during the presidency of Antonio José de Sucre, following the promulgation of the Political Constitution of 1826, the first in the country's history. However, Sucre himself would never elect a candidate to be presented to the National Congress, leaving the position vacant throughout his term. The first elected vice president was José Miguel de Velasco on 12 August 1828. However, he was prevented from exercising the position as he instead served as interim president in the absence of the elected president Andrés de Santa Cruz.

As Santa Cruz never appeared to take office, the Conventional Assembly convened on 18 December 1828 to elect new leaders. José Ramón de Loayza would be elected vice president to Pedro Blanco Soto. Loayza served as acting president in the absence of Soto until 26 December at which point Soto assumed the office of the presidency and Loayza would exercise the vice presidency for the first time.

Vice Presidency		Vice President	Party	Designation	Government	President
1	18 December 1828 – 1 January 1829; End of mandate	José Ramón de Loayza	Independent	Elected by the Constituent Assembly	Provisional	Acting to 26 Dec. 1828
1	18 December 1828 – 1 January 1829; End of mandate	José Ramón de Loayza	Independent	Elected by the Constituent Assembly	Provisional	Pedro Blanco; Soto
Office vacant 1 – 31 January 1829 (Note: On 31 January 1829, José Miguel de Velasco Franco would be elected vice president to Andrés de Santa Cruz. Velasco served as acting president in the absence of Santa Cruz until 24 May 1829 at which point Santa Cruz assumed the office of the presidency and Velasco would exercise the vice presidency.)
2	31 January 1829 – 23 July 1835; Dismissed	José Miguel de Velasco Franco	Independent	Elected by the Constituent Assembly	Provisional (31 January 1829)	Acting to 24 May 1829
2	31 January 1829 – 23 July 1835; Dismissed	José Miguel de Velasco Franco	Independent	Reelected by the Constituent Congress	Constitutional (14 August 1831)	Andrés de Santa Cruz
3	23 July 1835 – 28 October 1836; Legal change	Mariano Enrique; Calvo	Independent	Appointed by Andrés de Santa Cruz	Constitutional	Andrés de Santa Cruz

=== Bolivian State (1836–1839) ===
The Bolivian State was one of the three states that made up the Peru-Bolivian Confederation. On 28 October 1836, Andrés de Santa Cruz was elected Supreme Protector of the Peru-Bolivian Confederation while simultaneously being the president of the Bolivian State. José Miguel de Velasco Franco remained vice president of the Bolivian State until 23 July 1835 when he was replaced by Mariano Enrique Calvo. For much of his tenure, Calvo would serve as acting president in replacement of Santa Cruz when he was in Peruvian territory.

Vice Presidency		Vice President	Party	Designation	Government	President
3	28 October 1836 – 20 February 1839; Resigned from office	Mariano Enrique; Calvo	Independent	Elected by the Congress of Tapacarí	Constitutional	Andrés de Santa Cruz
3	28 October 1836 – 20 February 1839; Resigned from office	Mariano Enrique; Calvo	Independent	Elected by the Congress of Tapacarí	Constitutional	Acting since 1836 (Note: Andrés de Santa Cruz assumed the position of Supreme Protector of the Peru-Bolivian Confederation in parallel with that of the presidency of Bolivia. On 23 July 1835, Mariano Enrique Calvo is appointed vice president. In 1836, he assumes the acting presidency of Bolivia in Santa Cruz's absence, in order to act as the representative of the Bolivian State in the Confederation, while Santa Cruz was in Lima governing the Confederation.)

=== Republic of Bolivia (1880–2009) ===
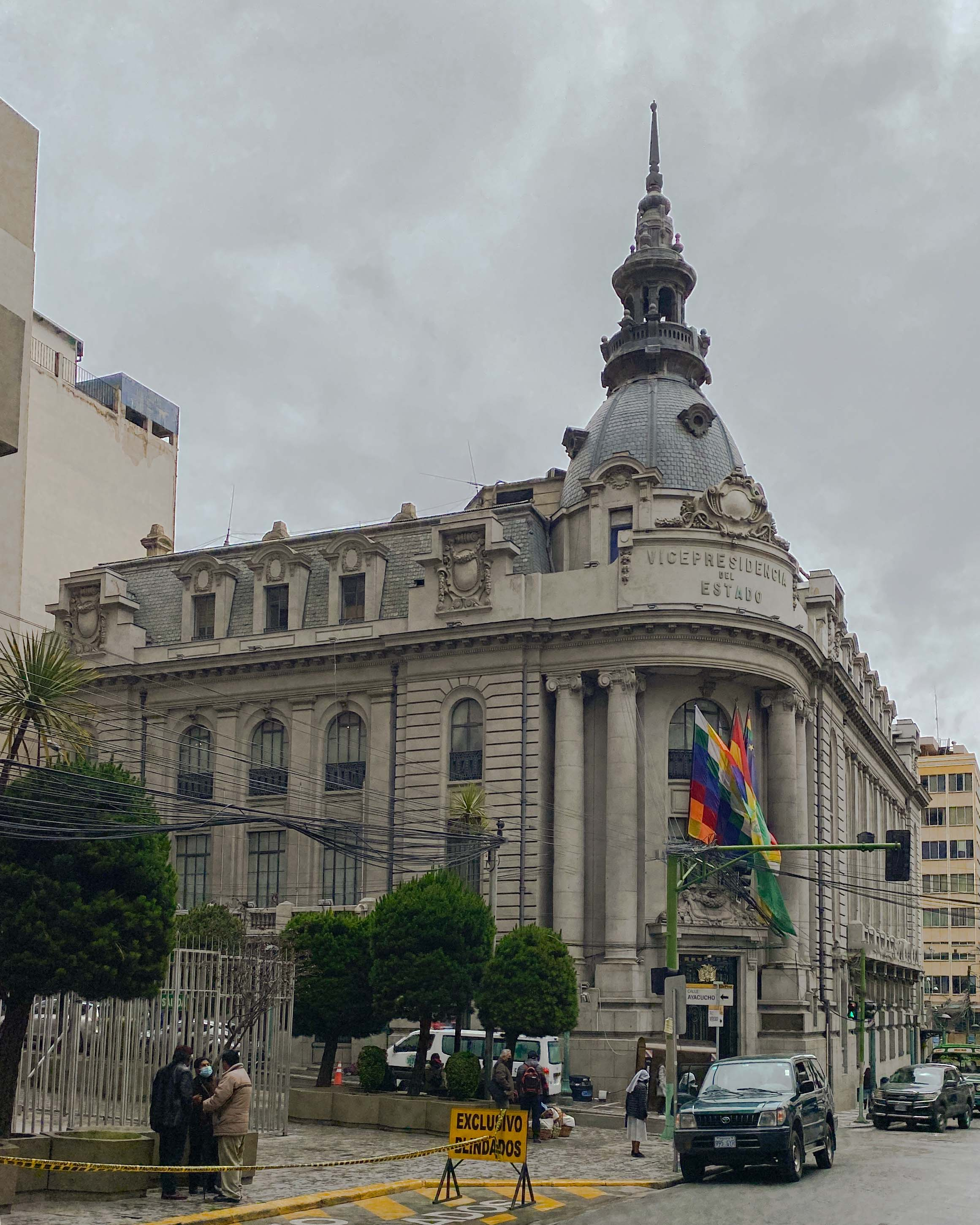
Vice Presidential Palace in La Paz

Upon the dissolution of the Peru-Bolivian Confederation, Jose Miguel de Velasco overthrew Marshal Andrés de Santa Cruz and assumed the presidency of the Bolivian State on 22 February 1839, bringing an end to it and reviving the Republic of Bolivia with his secessionist pronouncement. On 26 October 1839, de Velasco promulgated the Political Constitution of 1839 which eliminated the position of vice president making the President of the Senate the first in the presidential order of succession instead. This situation lasted until 15 February 1878, when the Political Constitution of 1878 was promulgated under Hilarión Daza. The Constitution of 1878 reincorporated the position of vice president, though it remained vacant for the remainder of Daza's presidency.

Following the overthrow of Daza, during the presidency of Narciso Campero, the unique feature of two vice presidents came to be. On 31 May 1880, the National Convention appointed Aniceto Arce and Belisario Salinas, respectively, as first and second vice presidents. The dual-vice presidency was formally established upon the promulgation of the Political Constitution of 1880 on 28 October. The Constitution of 1880 established two vice presidents who were elected like the president by direct vote, but with different powers: The first vice president presided over the Senate and was empowered to replace or succeed the president while the second vice president only had the function of replacing or succeeding the president in case of absence, resignation, inability or death of the first vice president.

This dual form of vice presidents was in force until 24 January 1921 when the Congress-Convention of 1921, convened by Bautista Saavedra, abolished the position of second vice president. On 4 December 1939, interim president Carlos Quintanilla would amend the 1938 Constitution to abolish the office of the vice presidency in order to circumnavigate the claims to succession of former vice president Enrique Baldivieso. The position was revived on 24 November 1945 with the promulgation of the Political Constitution of 1945 during the presidency of Gualberto Villarroel.

Vice Presidency		Vice President	Party	Election	Government	President
4	31 May 1880 – 11 March 1881; Dismissed	Aniceto Arce	Conservative	Elected by the National Convention	Constitutional (1st)	Narciso Campero
5	31 May 1880 – 4 September 1884; End of term	Belisario Salinas	Conservative	Elected by the National Convention	Constitutional (2nd)	Narciso Campero
6	4 September 1884 – 15 August 1888; End of term	Mariano Baptista	Conservative	1884	Constitutional (1st)	Gregorio Pacheco
7	4 September 1884 – 15 August 1888; End of term	Jorge Oblitas	Conservative	1884	Constitutional (2nd)	Gregorio Pacheco
8	15 August 1888 – 11 August 1892; End of term	José Manuel del Carpio	Conservative	1888	Constitutional (1st)	Aniceto Arce
9	15 August 1888 – 11 August 1892; End of term	Serapio Reyes; Ortiz	Conservative	1888	Constitutional (2nd)	Aniceto Arce
10	11 August 1892 – 19 August 1896; End of term	Severo Fernández (Note: The second vice presidency remainde vacant due to the death of the Juan Federico Zuazo before taking office.)	Conservative	1892	Constitutional (1st)	Mariano Baptista
11	19 August 1896 – 12 April 1899; Deposed by coup d'état	Rafael Peña de Flores	Conservative	1896	Constitutional (1st)	Severo Fernández
12	19 August 1896 – 12 April 1899; Deposed by coup d'état	Jenaro Sanjinés	Conservative	1896	Constitutional (2nd)	Severo Fernández
Office vacant 12 April – 25 October 1899
13	25 October 1899 – 23 January 1903; Dismissed	Lucio Pérez; Velasco	Liberal	Elected by the National Convention	Constitutional (1st)	José Manuel; Pando
14	25 October 1899 – 14 August 1904; End of term	Aníbal Capriles; Cabrera	Liberal	Elected by the National Convention	Constitutional (2nd)	José Manuel; Pando
15	14 August 1904 – 12 August 1909; End of term	Eliodoro Villazón	Liberal	1904	Constitutional (1st)	Ismael Montes
16	14 August 1904 – 12 August 1909; End of term	Valentín Abecia; Ayllón	Liberal	1904	Constitutional (2nd)	Ismael Montes
17	12 August 1909 – 14 August 1913; End of term	Macario Pinilla; Vargas	Liberal	1909	Constitutional (1st)	Eliodoro Villazón
18	12 August 1909 – 1 October 1915; Died in office	Juan Misael; Saracho	Liberal	1909	Constitutional (2nd)	Eliodoro Villazón
18	12 August 1909 – 1 October 1915; Died in office	Juan Misael; Saracho	Liberal	1913	Constitutional (1st)	Ismael Montes
19	14 August 1913 – 15 August 1917; End of term	José Carrasco; Torrico	Liberal	1913	Constitutional (2nd)	Ismael Montes
20	15 August 1917 – 12 July 1920; Deposed by coup d'état	Ismael Vázquez; Virreira	Liberal	1917	Constitutional (1st)	José Gutiérrez; Guerra
21	15 August 1917 – 12 July 1920; Deposed by coup d'état	José Santos; Quinteros	Liberal	1917	Constitutional (2nd)	José Gutiérrez; Guerra
Office vacant 13 July 1920 – 10 January 1926
22	10 January 1926 – 28 May 1930; De facto exiled (Note: In 1926, Hernando Siles Reyes split with the Saavedristas of Bautista Saavedra's Socialist Republican Party (PRS) and formed the Nationalist Party (PN). As a result, Vice President Abdón Saavedra, Bautista Saavedra's brother, was in effect exiled from the country with the excuse of his gratitude tour to the American countries after the celebration of the Centennial of the Republic, although he never officially resigned from the vice presidency. For this reason, Saavedra's term only officially ended upon the resignation of Siles Reyes on 28 May 1930.)	Abdón Saavedra	PRS	Dec 1925	Constitutional	Hernando Siles; Reyes
Office vacant 28 May 1930 – 5 March 1931
23	5 March 1931 – 1 December 1934; Assumed presidency	José Luis; Tejada Sorzano	Liberal	1931	Constitutional	Daniel Salamanca; Urey
Office vacant 1 December 1934 – 28 May 1938
24	28 May 1938 – 24 April 1939; Dismissed	Enrique Baldivieso	PSU	Elected by the National Convention	Constitutional	Germán Busch
Office vacant 24 April – 24 November 1945
25	6 November 1945 (Note: On 3 November 1945, Julián Montellano would be proclaimed Vice President of the Republic and inaugurated on 6 November. However, the office of Vice President would remain officially abolished until the promulgation of a new constitution on 24 November.) – 21 July 1946; Deposed by coup d'état	Julián Montellano	MNR	Elected by the National Convention	Constitutional	Gualberto Villarroel
Office vacant 21 July 1946 – 10 March 1947
26	10 March 1947 – 24 October 1949; Assumed presidency (Note: In 1949, PURS leadership lost confidence in Hertzog and forced his resignation on 22 October in favor of his vice president, Mamerto Urriolagoitía, under the pretext of a non-existent disease. Urriolagoitía held executive power immediately after Hertzog's resignation but his term officially started two days later following his inauguration on 24 October.)	Mamerto Urriolagoitía	PURS	1947	Constitutional	Enrique Hertzog
Office vacant 22 October 1949 – 11 April 1952
27	11 April 1952 – 6 August 1956; End of term	Hernán Siles; Zuazo	MNR	Installed by a coup d'état	De facto	Acting to 15 Apr. 1952
27	11 April 1952 – 6 August 1956; End of term	Hernán Siles; Zuazo	MNR	Installed by a coup d'état	De facto	Víctor Paz; Estenssoro
28	6 August 1956 – 24 June 1957; Resigned from office	Ñuflo Chávez; Ortiz	MNR	1956	Constitutional	Hernán Siles; Zuazo
Office vacant 24 June 1957 – 6 August 1960
29	6 August 1960 – 6 August 1964; End of term	Juan Lechín; Oquendo	MNR	1960	Constitutional	rowspan="2" Víctor Paz; Estenssoro
30	6 August 1964 – 4 November 1964; Assumed presidency	René Barrientos	MNR	1964	Constitutional	
Office vacant 5 November 1964 – 6 August 1966
31	6 August 1966 – 27 April 1969; Assumed presidency	Luis Adolfo; Siles Salinas	PSD	1966	Constitutional	René Barrientos
Office vacant 27 April 1969 – 10 October 1982
32	10 October 1982 – 14 December 1984; Resigned from office	Jaime Paz; Zamora	MIR	1980 (Note: On 10 October 1982, the military government of Guido Vildoso recognized the results of the annulled 1980 general elections and handed command to Hernán Siles Zuazo and his vice president, Jaime Paz Zamora.)	Constitutional	Hernán Siles; Zuazo
Office vacant 14 December 1984 – 6 August 1985
33	6 August 1985 – 6 August 1989; End of term	Julio Garrett; Ayllón	MNR	1985	Constitutional	Víctor Paz; Estenssoro
34	6 August 1989 – 6 August 1993; End of term	Luis Ossio	PDC	1989	Constitutional	Jaime Paz; Zamora
35	6 August 1993 – 6 August 1997; End of term	Víctor Hugo; Cárdenas	MRTKL	1993	Constitutional	Gonzalo Sánchez de Lozada
36	6 August 1997 – 7 August 2001; Assumed presidency	Jorge Quiroga	ADN	1997	Constitutional	Hugo Banzer
Office vacant 7 August 2001 – 6 August 2002
37	6 August 2002 – 17 October 2003; Assumed presidency	Carlos Mesa	Independent	2002	Constitutional	Gonzalo Sánchez de Lozada
Office vacant 17 October 2003 – 22 January 2006
38	22 January 2006 – 22 January 2010; Legal change	Álvaro García; Linera	MAS	2005	Constitutional	Evo Morales

=== Plurinational State of Bolivia (2009–present) ===
The emergence of the Plurinational State occurred as a consequence of the promulgation of the Political Constitution of 2009. Drafted by the Constituent Assembly in 2007, the new constitution was approved in a popular referendum on 25 January 2009, and was promulgated on 7 February. The Constitution resulted in a change in the official name of the country, leaving behind its previous denominative of Republic of Bolivia to become the Plurinational State of Bolivia. In order to comply with the structural changes of the new constitution, it was decided to advance the general elections to be held on 6 December 2009, with Evo Morales and Vice President Álvaro García Linera winning again, with 64.22% of the votes. This situation made Álvaro García Linera the last vice president of the Republic and the first of the Plurinational State.

Vice Presidency		Vice President	Party	Election	Government	President
38	22 January 2010 – 10 November 2019; Resigned from office	Álvaro García; Linera	MAS	2009	Constitutional	Evo Morales
38	22 January 2010 – 10 November 2019; Resigned from office	Álvaro García; Linera	MAS	2014	Constitutional	Evo Morales
Office vacant 10 November 2019 – 8 November 2020
39	8 November 2020 – 8 November 2025	David Choquehuanca	MAS	2020	Constitutional	Luis Arce
40	8 November 2025 – Incumbent	Edmand Lara	PDC	2025	Constitutional	Rodrigo Paz Pereira

== See also ==
- President of Bolivia
- List of presidents of Bolivia
- List of current vice presidents
