= President of the Chamber of Senators of Bolivia =

The president of the Chamber of Senators of Bolivia (Spanish: Presidente de la Cámara de Senadores de Bolivia) is the presiding officer of the upper chamber of the Plurinational Legislative Assembly. The president is currently elected for a one-year term.

Below is a list of office-holders.:

== Presidents 1831 to 1868 ==
Name	Took office	Left office	Notes
Crispin Díez de Medina	1831	October 1831 – ?	
Baltazar Alquiza	? – 1832	1832	
Manuel Cabello	1832	November 1833 – ?	
Eusebio Gutierres	1833	1833 – ?	
Crispin Díez de Medina	? – October 1834	November 1834 – ?	
Miguel María de Aguirre	? – 1835	1835 – ?	
José Pablo Hevia y Vaca	? – June 1836	June 1836 – ?	
José Eustaquio Eguivar	? – 1837	1837 – ?	
Nicolas Dorado	? – 1838	1838 – ?	
Ángel Mariano Moscoso	? – 1839	1839 – ?	
Manuel Hermenejildo Guerra	? – 1840	1840	
Manuel Sánchez de Velasco	? – August 1840	1841	
Crispin Díez de Medina	? – October 1844	November 1844 – ?	
Casimiro Olañeta	? – September 1846	September 1846	
Manuel de la Cruz Mendez	September 1846	1847	
José Maria Linares	6 August 1848	13 October 1848	
Manuel Laguna	1849	August 1850 – ?	
Martín Cardon	? – August 1850	August 1850 – ?	
Juan Crisóstomo Unzueta	1850	1850 – ?	
Miguel María de Aguirre	1855	1855	
Pantaleón Dalence	? – 1857	1857 – ?	

== Presidents after 1878 ==
Name	Took office	Left office	Notes
Aniceto Arce	May 1880	March 1881	
Mariano Baptista	? – July 1881	1883	
Demetrio Calvimonte	1883	1883	
Aniceto Arce	? – August 1883	September 1884	
Mariano Baptista	September 1884	August 1888	
José Manuel del Carpio	August 1888	August 1892	
Severo Fernández	August 1892	August 1896	
Rafael Peña de Flores	August 1896	April 1899	
Lucio Pérez Velasco	August 1900	January 1903	
Pastor Sainz Cossío	1903	1903	
Federico Diez de Medina	1903	1903	
Aníbal Capriles Cabrera	? – August 1903	August 1904	
Eliodoro Villazón	August 1904	August 1909	
Macario Pinilla Vargas	August 1909	August 1913	
Juan Misael Saracho	August 1913	October 1915	
Benedicto Goytia	October 1915	August 1917	
Ismael Vázquez Virreira	August 1917	July 1920	
José Antezana	1920	1920 - ?	
Severo Fernández	November 1921	February 1922 - ?	
José Quintín Mendoza	? – March 1922	February 1925 – ?	
Felipe S. Guzmán	? – September 1925	October 1925 – ?	
Adolfo Mier	? – October 1925	November 1925 – ?	
José Paravicini	? – November 1925	January 1926	
Abdón Saavedra	January 1926	May 1930	
José Luis Tejada Sorzano	March 1931	November 1934	
Zenón C. Orías	March 1935	August 1935 – ?	
Gabriel Palenque	? – February 1936	May 1936	
Enrique Baldivieso	May 1938	April 1939	
A. Saavedra Novales	April 1940	April 1940 – ?	
Arturo Galindo	? – October 1940	November 1941	
Waldo Belmonte Pool	November 1941	August 1943	
Luis Calvo	August 1943	August 1943	
Manuel Carrasco Jiménez	August 1943	December 1943	
Mamerto Urriolagoitía	March 1947	October 1949	
Waldo Belmonte Pool	October 1949	September 1950 - ?	
Juan Manuel Balcázar	? – October 1950	November 1950	
Ñuflo Chávez Ortiz	August 1956	June 1957	
Juan Lechín	June 1957	August 1957	
Federico Alvarez Plata	August 1957	September 1959	
Rubén Julio Castro	September 1959	August 1961	
Alberto Lavadenz Ribera	August 1961	November 1961	
Federico Fortún Sanjines	November 1961	November 1962	
Mario Tórres Calleja	November 1962	December 1962 – ?	
Federico Fortún Sanjines	August 1963	October 1963	
José Hugo Vilar	October 1963	January 1964 – ?	
Rubén Julio Castro	May 1964	November 1964	
Ricardo Anaya Arze	August 1966	August 1967	
Hugo Bozo Alcócer	August 1967	August 1968	
Manfredo Kempff Mercado	August 1968	August 1969	
Julio Campero Trigo	August 1969	September 1969	
Wálter Guevara Arze	August 1979	August 1979	
Leónidas Sánchez Arana	August 1979	December 1979	
Wálter Guevara Arze	December 1979	July 1980	
Julio Garrett Ayllón	October 1982	August 1985	
Gonzalo Sanchez de Losada	August 1985	August 1986	
Óscar Zamora Medinaceli	August 1986	August 1987	
Ciro Humboldt Barrero	August 1987	August 1989	
Gonzalo Valda Cárdenas	August 1989	August 1991	
Guillermo Fortún Suárez	August 1991	August 1993	
Juan Carlos Durán Saucedo	August 1993	August 1996	
Raúl Lema Patiño	August 1996	August 1997	
Wálter Guiteras Denis	August 1997	August 1999	
Leopoldo Fernández Ferreira	August 1999	August 2001	
Enrique Toro Tejada	August 2001	August 2002	
Mirtha Quevedo Acalinovic	August 2002	August 2003	
Hormando Vaca Diez	August 2003	August 2005	
Sandro Giordano	August 2005	January 2006	
Santos Ramírez Valverde	January 2006	August 2006	
José Villavicencio Amaruz	August 2006	January 2008	
Óscar Ortiz Antelo	January 2008	January 2010	
Ana Maria Romero de Campero	January 2010	October 2010	
René Martínez Callahuanca	October 2010	January 2012	
Gabriela Montaño	January 2012	January 2014	
Eugenio Rojas	January 2014	January 2015	
José Alberto Gonzáles	January 2015	August 2018	
Milton Barón Hidalgo	August 2018	January 2019	
Adriana Salvatierra	18 January 2019	10 November 2019	
Jeanine Áñez	10 November 2019	10 November 2019	
Mónica Eva Copa	14 November 2019	3 November 2020	
Andrónico Rodríguez	3 November 2020	6 November 2025	
Diego Ávila	6 November 2025		

== See also ==
- President of the Chamber of Deputies of Bolivia
