= Octavio La Faye =

Bolivian military officer (1841–1902)

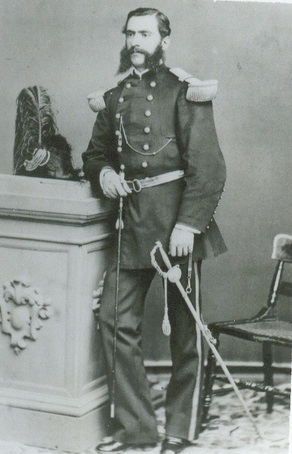

Personal details
- Born: November 18, 1841; Cochabamba, Bolivia
- Died: November 10, 1902; Cochabamba, Bolivia
- Political party: Liberal Party
- Spouse: Justa Sanjinés Quiroga
- Children: 4
- Parent(s): Juan La Fayer Boyer; Ignacia Lopez de Quiroga

Military service
- Allegiance: Bolivia
- Branch/service: Bolivian Army
- Rank: Brigadier general

Octavio La Faye (18 November 1841 – 10 November 1902) was a Bolivian military officer who served during the War of the Pacific. Although his role in this conflict was limited, he saw action. He was a supporter of the Liberal Party, aiding José Manuel Pando during the Bolivian Civil War. Throughout his life, he was also a businessman, owning a large estate, extensive lands, and several industrial plants.

== Early life and military career ==
La Faye belonged to a family of military background; he was a descendant of General Francisco López de Quiroga. He was the son of Colonel Don Juan La Faye, of French nationality, and Ignacia López de Quiroga y Civera. He was born in Cochabamba and received his education in the city of his birth. In 1871, he enlisted as a second lieutenant in the rebel ranks that brought an end to the dictatorship of Mariano Melgarejo that year. Shortly thereafter, in August of the same year, he was promoted to the rank of first lieutenant, demonstrating his skills and inclination for a military career, earning him rapid promotions.

In December 1872, he was promoted to graduated captain; in October 1873, to effective captain; in June 1874, to effective sergeant major; in February 1875, to graduated commander; in June 1876, to effective commander; in August 1877, to lieutenant colonel of cavalry. Since joining the army, he participated in the civil wars that plagued the country and fought in the battles of Chacoma in January 1875, against Quintin Quevedo, as well as in the Battle of Cochabamba on March 28 of the same year. In 1880, after the Pacific campaign, he commanded the "Hussars of Rocha" regiment, where he remained during the government of General Narcisco Campero.

== Politics ==
In 1884, he took command of the "Bolívar" regiment, which was organized in September 1885 by merging the second and third cavalry squadrons. La Faye was one of the supporters of President Aniceto Arce when the revolution of September 8, 1888, took place, having been present in the armed action of Kari-kari in October of the same year. For his loyalty to the established government, the legislative chambers promoted him to the rank of colonel on November 1. In September 1889, while the "Bolívar Regiment" was garrisoning the city of Cochabamba, some liberals attacked the barracks of this unit shouting, "Long live Colonel La Faye!" In the shootout between civilians and the guard, the duty captain and a soldier died. However, when the troops reacted against the attackers, they fled, suffering some casualties. As a result of this event and some political disagreements with President Arce, La Faye left the army, being relentlessly pursued as accused of plotting against public order and tranquility. In 1898, La Faye sided with the liberals in Cochabamba, in the company of Dr. Aníbal Capriles and his brother Julio. When they triumphed in the Paria fields on April 10, 1899, he was reinstated in the army by President José Manuel Pando, being promoted to brigadier general in December of that same year. This was declared as a reward for his dedicated work "for the sacred cause".

== Later life and death ==
By the year 1900, La Faye had accumulated a considerable fortune through successful business ventures and began to purchase land. He worked alongside Atanasio de Urioste Velasco to bring electricity to Cochabamba, Potosí, and Tarija. He was also an advocate of industrialism, using his French connections to acquire and import machinery capable of significantly improving production. He faced resistance, especially from artisans. Nevertheless, his land acquisitions allowed his business to grow. On January 22, 1901, he purchased the entire family estate of the Daza family, which was ruined after the assassination of Hilarion Daza in 1894. La Faye died in his hometown on November 10, 1902, after having served in the Bolivian Army for more than thirty years.
