= Eliodoro Villazón =

27th President of Bolivia

Eliodoro Villazón Montaño
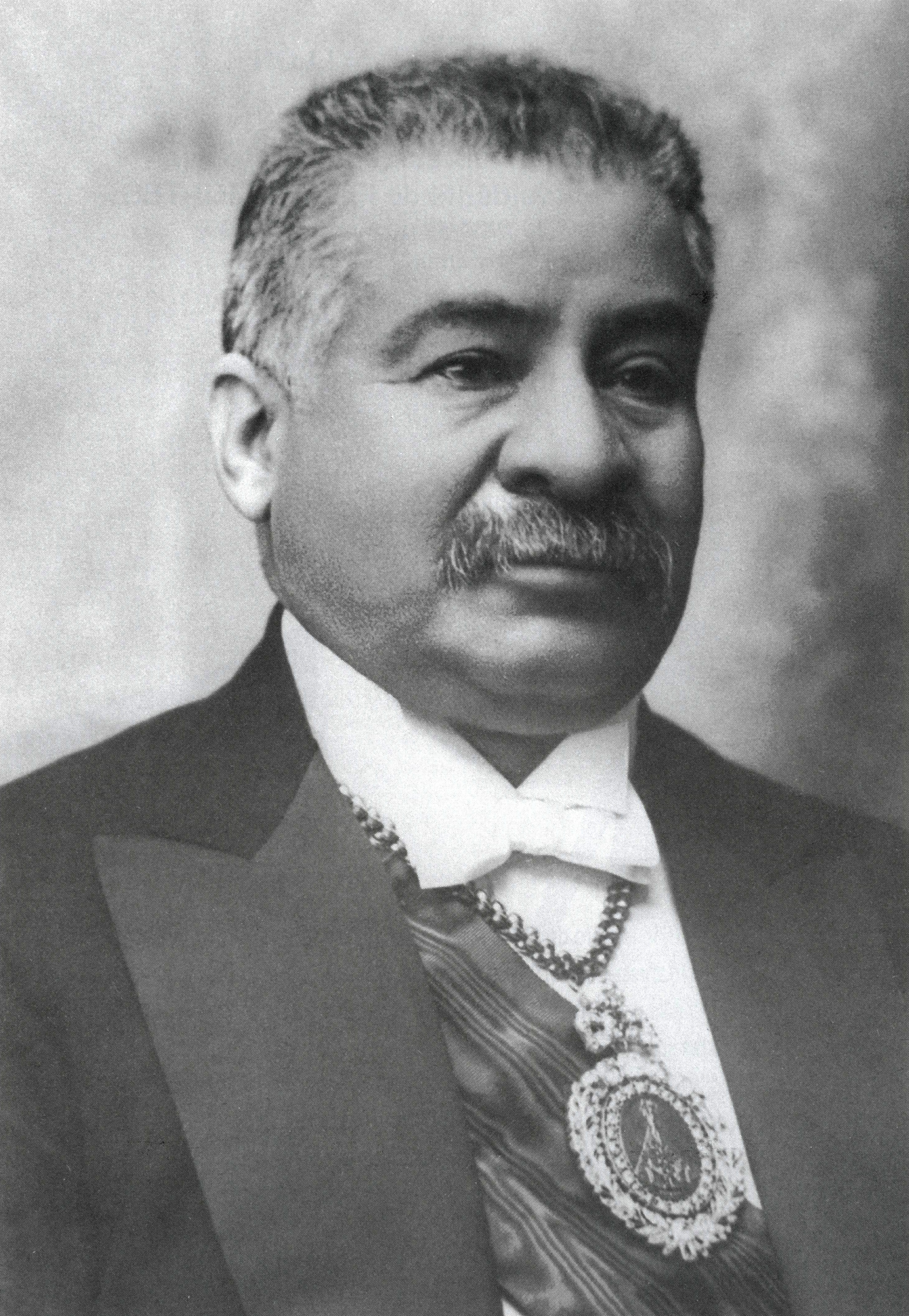

27th President of Bolivia
- In office 12 August 1909 – 14 August 1913
- Vice President: Macario Pinilla; Juan Misael Saracho
- Preceded by: Ismael Montes
- Succeeded by: Ismael Montes

15th Vice President of Bolivia
- First Vice President
- In office 14 August 1904 – 12 August 1909 Serving with Valentín Abecia Ayllón
- President: Ismael Montes
- Preceded by: Lucio Pérez Velasco
- Succeeded by: Macario Pinilla Vargas
Other offices
Minister of Foreign Affairs and Worship
In office 29 April 1902 – 27 October 1903
President	José Manuel Pando
Preceded by	Federico Díez de Medina
Succeeded by	Claudio Pinilla
In office 2 February 1900 – 4 December 1900
President	José Manuel Pando
Preceded by	Fernando Eloy Guachalla
Succeeded by	Demetrio Calbimonte (acting)
Minister of Government and Justice
In office 19 March 1902 – 29 April 1902
President	José Manuel Pando
Preceded by	Aníbal Capriles Cabrera
Succeeded by	José Carrasco Torrico
Minister of Finance and Industry
In office 18 December 1880 – 4 August 1881
President	Narciso Campero
Preceded by	Antonio Quijarro
Succeeded by	Antonio Quijarro
Minister of Finance
In office 15 April 1880 – 20 June 1880
President	Narciso Campero
Preceded by	Eulogio Doria Medina
Succeeded by	Antonio Quijarro

Personal details
- Born: Eliodoro Villazón Montaño; 22 January 1848 Sacaba, Cochabamba, Bolivia
- Died: 12 September 1939 (aged 91) Cochabamba, Bolivia
- Party: Liberal
- Spouse: Enriqueta Torrico González
- Relations: Anastasio Villazón (great uncle)
- Parent(s): José Manuel Villazón; Manuela Montaño

Eliodoro Villazón Montaño (22 January 1848 – 12 September 1939) was a Bolivian lawyer and politician who served as the 27th president of Bolivia from 1909 to 1913 and as the 15th vice president of Bolivia from 1904 to 1909.

== Early life ==
Villazón was born on January 22, 1848, in the town of Sacaba in the department of Cochabamba. He was the son of José Manuel Villazón and Manuela Montaño. His great uncle was General Anastasio Villazón. He graduated as a lawyer from the University of San Francisco Xavier and one of the most distinguished lawmakers in the country.

At the age of twenty, during the de facto government of President Mariano Melgarejo (1864-1871), Villazón founded the newspaper El Ferroviario. Villazon married Enriqueta Torrico.

== Political career ==
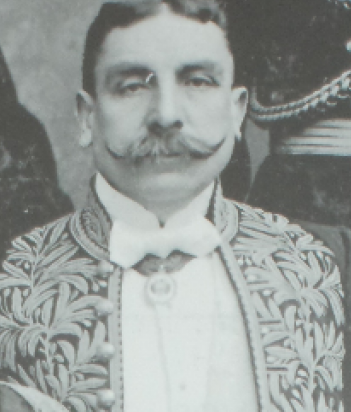
Francisco Argandoña was one of the wealthiest men in Bolivia and employed Villazón as his accountant.

He began his political career at a very young age, joining the Partido Rojo, a party founded by former president José María Linares. He was also a municipal councilor for the city of Cochabamba and Deputy for the department of Cochabamba on several occasions.

At the age of twenty-three, Villazón attended the National Assembly of 1871 which had been called by the government of newly installed President Agustín Morales after the overthrow of Melgarejo. Furthermore, he attended the Conventions of 1880 and 1889 as a delegate. He was Minister of Finance and Industry during the government of President Narciso Campero, in which he also represented Bolivia as its financial agent in Europe. Specialized in finance, Villazón made a considerable fortune by managing the fortunes of several magnates of his time, including that of Francisco Argandoña and Gregorio Pacheco.

Because of his affluence and political power, he was one of the main founders of the Liberal Party of Bolivia and supported his party during the Bolivian Civil War of 1898-1899. He was Minister of Foreign Relations during the government of liberal President José Manuel Pando, and he devoted himself to resolving border conflicts with Bolivia's neighboring countries.

During the presidency of Ismael Montes, Villazón became Vice President of Bolivia at the age of 56, serving from 1904 to 1909. He also worked as a defense attorney in the Bolivian-Peruvian border dispute over the Manuripi.

== President of Bolivia ==
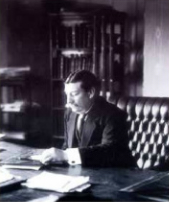
Ismael Montes, President of Bolivia and Villazón's political ally.

Villazón ran as the Liberal Party's candidate for the presidency during the 1909 general elections. He triumphed by a wide margin that year, succeeding Ismael Montes as president. He was installed as president of Bolivia at sixty-one years of age, on August 12, 1909, along with his 2 vice presidents: Macario Pinilla Vargas (first vice-presidency) and Juan Misael Saracho (second vice-presidency).

His government was one of the most prosperous in the republican history of Bolivia, since it enjoyed a budget surplus and a context of tranquility, despite the mining crisis of 1908. He created the Higher Institute of Commerce of La Paz, hoping to further the economic stability the country was enjoying. He also founded the Oruro School of Mines, today the National Faculty of Engineering, and built railway from Cochabamba to Arani, inaugurated in 1913.

Villazón signed a Border Rectification Treaty with Peru, known as the Polo-Sánchez Bustamante Treaty. It was signed in the city of La Paz on September 17, 1909, by the Minister Plenipotentiary of Peru, Solón Polo, and the Minister of Foreign Affairs of Bolivia, Daniel Sánchez Bustamante. This treaty put an end to the Peruvian-Bolivian border dispute, and prevented an alliance between Bolivia and Chile against Peru. It also fixed some pending boundary issues with Argentina.

At the end of his term, he handed over the command of his party to his eventual successor, Ismael Montes, who won the general elections of 1913 and was inaugurated as president on August 14. Villazón then traveled to Buenos Aires to work as Plenipotentiary Ambassador of Bolivia in Argentina.

== Later life and death ==
Twenty-six years after having left the presidency, Eliodoro Villazón died on September 12, 1939, in the city of Cochabamba at the age of ninety-one. He was one of the four oldest presidents of Bolivia, along with Hugo Ballivián, Víctor Paz Estenssoro and Lidia Gueiler.

Political offices
Vacant Ladislao Cabrera as Minister General Title last held by Eulogio Doria Medina	Minister of Finance; 1880	Succeeded by Antonio Quijarro
Preceded by Antonio Quijarro	Minister of Finance and Industry; 1880–1881	Succeeded by Antonio Quijarro
Preceded by Fernando Eloy Guachalla	Minister of Foreign Affairs and Worship; 1900	Succeeded by Demetrio Calbimonte; Acting
Preceded by Aníbal Capriles Cabrera	Minister of Government and Justice; 1902	Succeeded by José Carrasco Torrico
Preceded by Federico Díez de Medina	Minister of Foreign Affairs and Worship; 1902–1903	Succeeded by Claudio Pinilla
Preceded by Lucio Pérez Velasco	Vice President of Bolivia; First Vice President; 1904–1909; Served alongside: Valentín Abecia Ayllón	Succeeded by Macario Pinilla Vargas
Preceded by Ismael Montes	President of Bolivia; 1909–1913	Succeeded by Ismael Montes
Party political offices
Preceded by Ismael Montes	Liberal nominee for President of Bolivia; 1909	Succeeded by Ismael Montes
Records
Preceded by Lizardo García	Oldest living state leader 29 May 1937–12 September 1939	Succeeded by Alejandro Deustua
