= Rafael Peña =

Bolivian lawyer and teacher

Rafael Peña de Flores
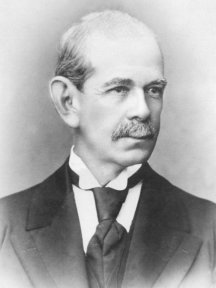

11th Vice President of Bolivia
- First Vice President
- In office 19 August 1896 – 12 April 1889 Serving with Jenaro Sanjinés
- President: Severo Fernández
- Preceded by: Severo Fernández
- Succeeded by: Lucio Pérez Velasco

Personal details
- Born: 23 October 1822 Santa Cruz, Bolivia
- Died: 28 June 1901 (aged 78) Sucre, Bolivia
- Party: Conservative
- Parents: Mariano Peña (father); Petrona Flores (mother)
- Education: University of Saint Francis Xavier

Rafael Peña de Flores (23 October 1822 – 28 June 1901) was a Bolivian lawyer, teacher, naturalist, and politician who served as the 11th vice president of Bolivia from 1896 to 1899. He served as first vice president alongside second vice president Jenaro Sanjinés during the administration of Severo Fernández.

== Early life and career ==
Rafael Peña de Flores was born on 23 October 1822 in Santa Cruz. He was the son of Mariano Peña and Petrona Flores. Around 1850, he studied law at the University of Saint Francis Xavier before becoming a professor of mathematics and natural history at the College of Arts and Sciences, now known as the Florida National College, in Santa Cruz.

He served twice as prefect of Santa Cruz. Later, he was elected Senator for the department of Santa Cruz and frequently performed municipal functions, exercising the presidency of the Santa Cruz Municipal Council on more than one occasion. Sympathetic to the revolutionary ideas of José María Linares, he suffered persecution following Linares' overthrow in 1861. In late 1865, he led a popular revolt against the military government of Mariano Melgarejo which ended in virtual disaster and his exile and asylum in Paraguay, a country at war with neighboring powers at the time.

== Vice President (1896–1899) ==
In the general election of 1896, he was nominated for the office of first vice president by Severo Fernández. Both, along with second vice presidential candidate Jenaro Sanjinés, won the election taking office on 19 August 1896. Upon the outbreak of the Federal War, which saw the end of almost two decades of Conservative rule, Peña exercised the acting presidency while Fernández commanded the army.

Ultimately, the Conservatives were ousted from government by the Liberal forces of José Manuel Pando on 12 April 1889.

Political offices
Preceded by Severo Fernández	Vice President of Bolivia; First Vice President; 1896–1890; Served alongside: Jenaro Sanjinés	Succeeded by Lucio Pérez Velasco
