= 1913 Bolivian presidential election =

Presidential elections were held in Bolivia on 4 May 1913 to elect a new president of the republic. Ismael Montes ran unopposed for a second non-consecutive term.

When accounting for spoilt and blank ballots, Montes's victory margin of 98.87% in the popular vote remains the largest margin of victory for any presidential candidate in Bolivian history, even compared to other candidates who ran unopposed.

== Results ==
=== President ===
Candidate	Running mate	Party	Votes	%
Ismael Montes Gamboa	Juan Misael Saracho; José Carrasco Torrico	Liberal Party	77,731	100.00
Total			77,731	100.00
Valid votes			77,731	98.87
Invalid/blank votes			891	1.13
Total votes			78,622	100.00
Source: Mesa Gisbert 2003, p. 303

== Bibliography ==
- Mesa Gisbert, Carlos D. (2003). Presidentes de Bolivia: Entre urnas y fusiles. El poder ejecutivo: Los ministros de Estado (in Spanish) (3rd ed.). La Paz: Editorial Gisbert. OCLC 54027445 – via the Internet Archive.
