= Aníbal Capriles Cabrera =

Bolivian politician (1854–1924)

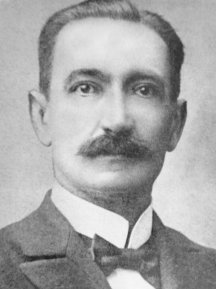

14th Vice President of Bolivia
- Second Vice President
- In office 25 October 1899 – 14 August 1904 Serving with Lucio Pérez Velasco
- President: José Manuel Pando
- Preceded by: Jenaro Sanjinés
- Succeeded by: Valentín Abecia Ayllón

Foreign Minister of Bolivia
- Acting
- In office 22 August 1914 – 24 December 1914
- President: Ismael Montes
- Preceded by: José Cupertino Arteaga
- Succeeded by: Juan Misael Saracho

Personal details
- Born: 21 December 1854 Cochabamba, Bolivia
- Died: 9 April 1924 (aged 69) Cochabamba, Bolivia
- Party: Liberal

Aníbal Capriles Cabrera (21 December 1854 – 9 April 1924) was a Bolivian professor, journalist and politician who served as the 14th vice president of Bolivia from 1899 to 1904. He served as second vice president alongside first vice president Lucio Pérez Velasco during the administration of José Manuel Pando. A member of the Liberal Party, Cabrera became sole vice president following the dismissal of Velasco by decree of 23 January 1903.

== Biography ==
In 1892, as director of the newspaper "El Progreso", he led a campaign of opposition against the Conservative Party which had ruled the country since 1884. His political ideas led him to exile, from where he resumed his journalistic campaign first with the newspaper "El Independiente", and then "El Elector".

During the Federal War, he took an active part as a military and political leader. Following the triumph of the Liberals over the Conservatives in the conflict, he was proclaimed second vice president to Pando by the National Convention on 25 October 1899. Two years later, he held the position of Minister of Government and Justice and later that of Development and Public Works. In the years of 1914, 1915 and 1916, he was in charge of the Ministry of Public Instruction.

Among his main works, he has left a biography of Antonio José de Sucre, published in 1883 and his well-known "Political Manifesto". He died in Cochabamba on 9 April 1924.

Political offices
Preceded by Jenaro Sanjinés	Vice President of Bolivia; Second Vice President; 1899–1904; Served alongside: Lucio Pérez Velasco	Succeeded by Valentín Abecia Ayllón
Preceded by José Cupertino Arteaga	Foreign Minister of Bolivia; Acting; 1914	Succeeded by Juan Misael Saracho
