= Valentín Abecia =

Bolivian physician and politician (1846–1910)

Valentín Abecia Ayllón
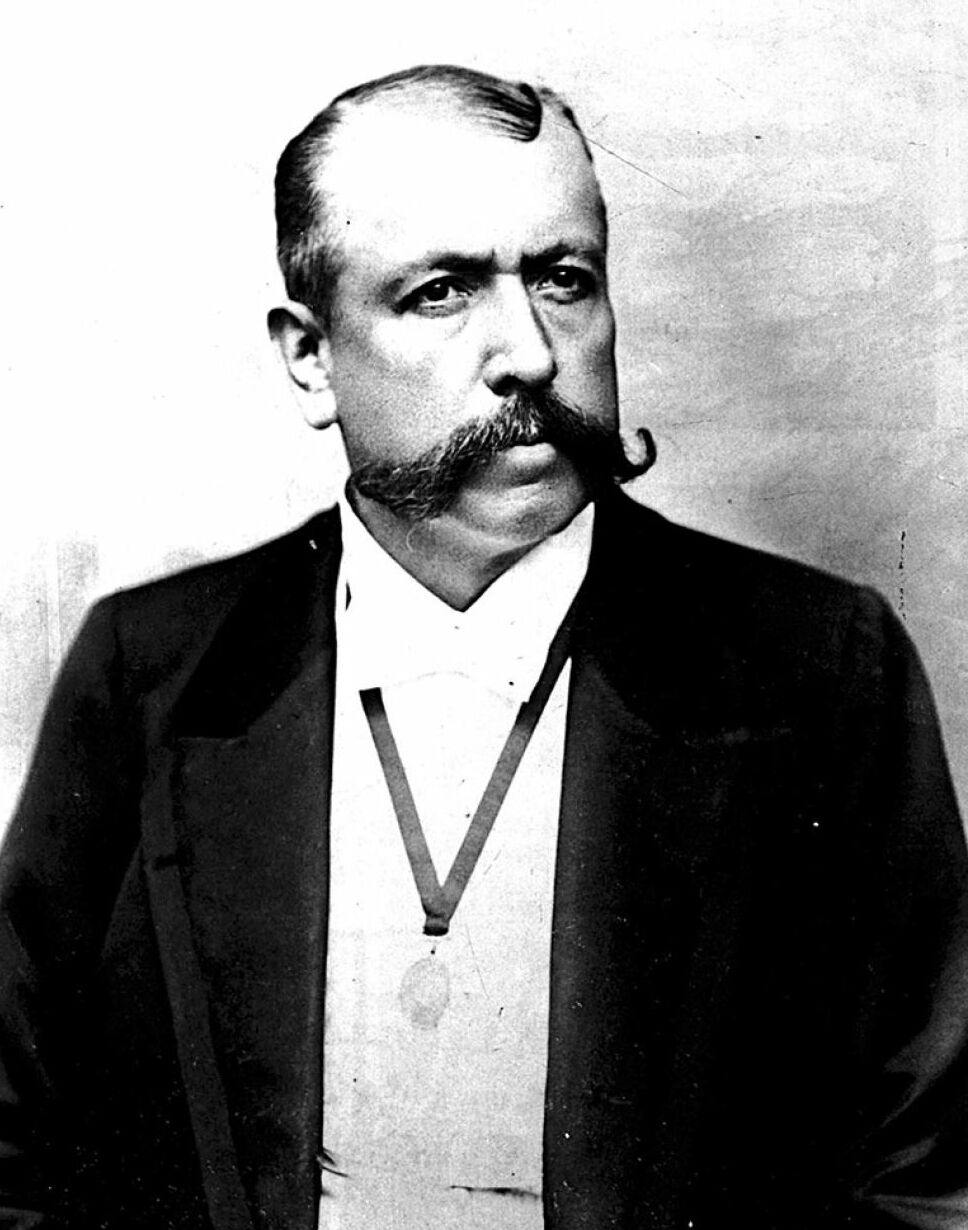

16th Vice President of Bolivia
- Second Vice President
- In office 14 August 1904 – 12 August 1909 Serving with Eliodoro Villazón
- President: Ismael Montes
- Preceded by: Aníbal Capriles Cabrera
- Succeeded by: Juan Misael Saracho

Personal details
- Born: José Valentín Abecia Ayllón; 6 February 1846 La Paz, Bolivia
- Died: 10 January 1910 (aged 63) La Paz, Bolivia
- Party: Liberal
- Education: University of Saint Francis Xavier

José Valentín Abecia Ayllón (6 February 1846 – 10 January 1910) was a Bolivian physician, historian, journalist and politician who served as the 16th vice president of Bolivia from 1904 to 1909. He served as second vice president alongside first vice president Eliodoro Villazón during the first administration of Ismael Montes.

Political offices
Preceded by Aníbal Capriles Cabrera	Vice President of Bolivia; Second Vice President; 1904–1909; Served alongside: Eliodoro Villazón	Succeeded by Juan Misael Saracho
