= Macario Pinilla =

Bolivian politician and lawyer (1855–1927)

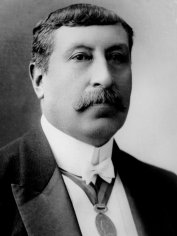

17th Vice President of Bolivia
- First Vice President
- In office 12 August 1909 – 14 August 1913 Serving with Juan Misael Saracho
- President: Eliodoro Villazón
- Preceded by: Eliodoro Villazón
- Succeeded by: Juan Misael Saracho

Personal details
- Born: Macario Pinilla Vargas; 24 November 1855 La Paz, Bolivia
- Died: 3 September 1927 (aged 71) La Paz, Bolivia
- Party: Liberal
- Education: Ayacucho College

Macario Pinilla Vargas (24 November 1855 – 3 September 1927) was a Bolivian lawyer and politician who served as the 17th vice president of Bolivia from 1909 to 1913. He served as first vice president alongside second vice president Juan Misael Saracho during the administration of Eliodoro Villazón.

== Biography ==
Macario Pinilla Vargas was born in La Paz on 24 November 1855. His parents were Juan Pinilla and Eduarda Vargas. He began his studies at the Ayacucho College in 1863, receiving a law degree in 1876. Pinilla was elected deputy for La Paz in 1888 and District Attorney of La Paz in 1892.

In 1899, following the defeat of the Conservatives in the Federal War, he became one of the heads the Federal Government Junta, a civil-military triumvirate composed of himself, José Manuel Pando, and Serapio Reyes Ortiz. Following the election of Pando as president by the National Assembly, he was appointed Minister before the Court of Spain on 12 December 1899. In 1902 and again in 1908, he was elected Senator for the department of La Paz. In the general election of 1909, he was elected first vice president for Eliodoro Villazón, taking office on 12 August. Alongside this position, he served as Minister to the governments of the Netherlands and France.

He died in the city of La Paz on 3 September 1927 at the age of 71.

Political offices
Preceded by Eliodoro Villazón	Vice President of Bolivia; First Vice President; 1909–1913; Served alongside: Juan Misael Saracho	Succeeded by Juan Misael Saracho
