= 1884 Bolivian general election =

- 1884
- Presidential election
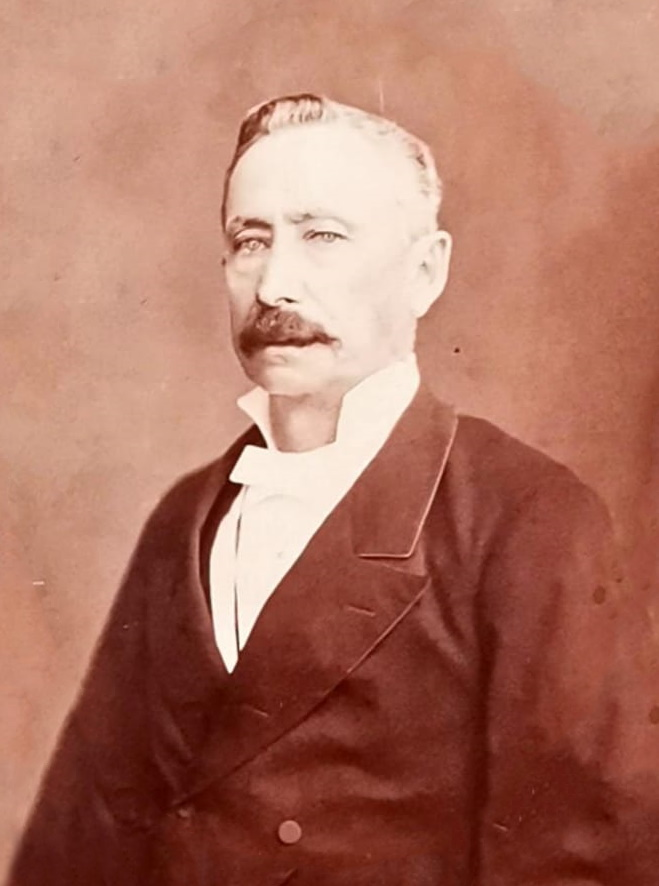

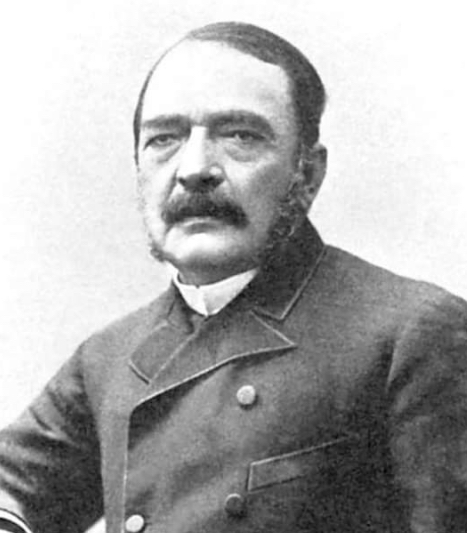

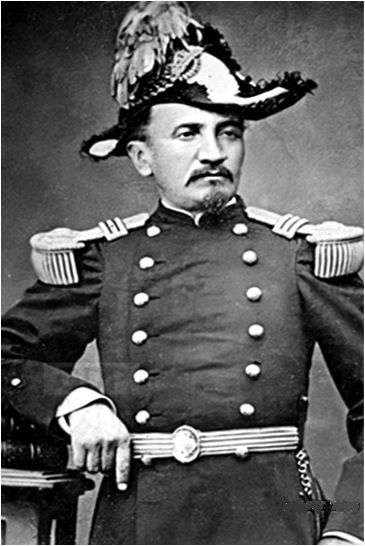
Candidate	Gregorio Pacheco	Aniceto Arce	Eliodoro Camacho
Party	Democratic	Conservative	Liberal
Electoral vote	47	–	29
Popular vote	11,760	10,263	8,202
Percentage	38.91%	33.96%	27.14%
President before election
Narciso Campero
Elected President
Gregorio Pacheco

General elections were held in Bolivia in 1884. Gregorio Pacheco of the Democratic Party received the most votes in the presidential election, whilst the Liberal Party emerged as the largest party in Congress. The election was free.

As no candidate received an absolute majority in the presidential election, the President was elected by Congress on 1 September. Although Pachecho's Democratic Party was the smallest faction in Congress, he was elected President by 47 votes to 29 for Liberal candidate Eliodoro Camacho after the Conservatives decided to support Pacheco. Their decision followed an agreement between Mariano Baptista of the Conservative Party and Jorge Oblitas and Casimiro Corral of the Liberal Party that Pacheco would work to support Conservative candidate Aniceto Arce in the next elections.

== Results ==
=== President ===
Candidate	Party	Public vote		Congress vote	
Candidate	Party	Votes	%	Votes	%
Gregorio Pacheco	Democratic Party	11,760	38.91	47	61.84
Aniceto Arce	Conservative Party	10,263	33.96		
Eliodoro Camacho	Liberal Party	8,202	27.14	29	38.16
Total		30,225	100.00	76	100.00
Source: OEP

=== Congress ===
Party	Seats
Liberal Party	30
Conservative Party	24
Democratic Party	22
Total	76
Source: OEP
