= El Diario (La Paz) =

Daily newspaper in Bolivia

- Front page on 13 January 2020
- Type: Daily newspaper
- Format: Tabloid
- Owner(s): Antonio Carrasco G.
- Editor: José Ticona E.
- Founded: 1904
- Headquarters: La Paz, Bolivia
- Website: eldiario.net

El Diario is a daily newspaper published in La Paz, Bolivia. Incorporated in 1904, it is Bolivia's oldest newspaper and considered a newspaper of record for Bolivia. The newspaper traditionally followed a conservative position in line with its founders, the Carrasco family, one of La Paz's most influential families of the 20th century.

== History ==
It was founded on April 5, 1904, and is Bolivia's oldest newspaper still in publication. It started as an evening paper, becoming a morning paper from the eighth edition; from edition 18 it started publishing daily dramas. In 1967, it started printing a few pages in color, and in the following decade, it adopted the offset system.

On April 5, 1953, coinciding with its 49th anniversary, El Diario inaugurated its first teletype service, which had a terminal manufactured by Westrex Corporation.

The newspaper was usurped on September 7, 1970, when Juan José Torres became president of the republic, suspending its publishing until September 1, 1971.

== Directors ==
- 1904 - 1908 José Carrasco Torrico
- 1908 - 1912 Benigno Lara
- 1913 Franz Tamayo
- 1913 Luis Espinoza y Saravia
- 1915 Ernesto Careaga Lanza
- 1916 - 1920 Casto Rojas
- 1918 Federico Gutiérrez Granier
- 1919 Claudio Peñaranda
- 1920 Octavio Limpias
- 1920 José Santos Quinteros
- 1920 - 1926 Fabián Vaca Chávez
- 1926 Carlos Romero
- 1926 Manuel Carrasco Jiménez
- 1926 - 1927 Alberto Ostria Gutiérrez
- 1927 - 1930 Manuel Carrasco Jiménez
- 1927 Fernando Guachalla
- 1930 - 1945 Manuel Carrasco Jiménez
- 1946 Julio César Canelas
- 1946 - 1948 Mario Carrasco Villalobos
- 1948 - 1955 José Carrasco Jiménez
- 1955 Luis Carrasco Jiménez
- 1955 - 1957 Oscar Cerruto
- 1957 - 1961 José Carrasco Jiménez
- 1961 - 1963 Mario Rolón Anaya
- 1964 - 1970 Jorge Carrasco Villalobos
- 1967 Carlos Romero Álvarez García (interino)
- 1970 - 1971 Pablo Arrieta
- 1971 Guillermo Céspedes Rivera
- 1971 - 1988 Jorge Carrasco Villalobos
- 1988 - 1992 Elena Jahnsen de Carrasco
- 1993 - 2002 Jorge Carrasco Jahnsen
- 2002 - 2015 Antonio Carrasco Guzmán

== Recognition ==
In 1999, the Bolivian government granted the Simón Bolívar Order of Civil Merit, under the Grand Cross order.
