= Government Junta of Bolivia (1899) =

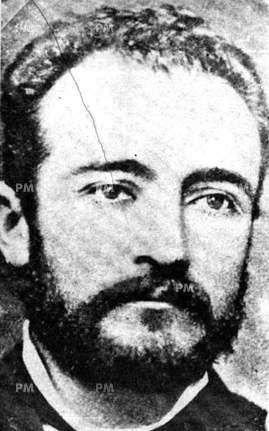
José Manuel Pando, member of the Federal Government Junta (1899).

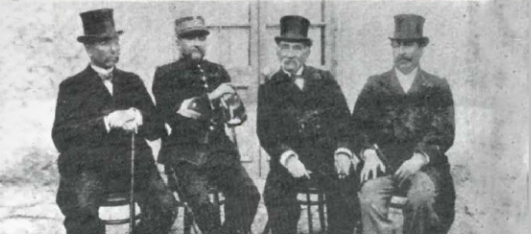
Members of the junta. (From left) Fernando Eloy Guachalla, José Manuel Pando, Serpaio Reyes Ortiz, and Macario Pinilla.

The Federal Government Junta (Spanish: Junta Federal de Gobierno) was a civil-military triumvirate which temporarily assumed power in Bolivia after Liberal party victory in the Federal Revolution of 1899. It was composed of Colonel (later, General) José Manuel Pando, Serapio Reyes Ortiz (previously the Prefect of La Paz Department), and doctor Macario Pinilla Vargas. The Junta was proclaimed on December 12, 1898, led the Liberal effort in the Revolution, and governed Bolivia from April 12 to October 25, 1899. It carried out various institutional reforms and erected public works, such as the construction of the Palace of Government in La Paz. In 1899, a National Convention elected Pando president, replacing the Junta.

== Precedents ==
During the presidency of conservative Severo Fernández Alonso the so-called Federal Revolution Federal began, a civil war between the elites of La Paz and Sucre, and between liberals and conservatives, aligned respectively with these two cities.

After four months of combat, the Liberals defeated the Conservatives at the Battle of Segundo Crucero. The Federal Junta consolidated its power over Bolivia.

== Work of the Junta ==
On April 14, 1899, doctors Macario Pinilla and Serapio Reyes, in the name of the Federal Government Junta proclaimed a decree declaring the city of La Paz as the definitive capital of the Republic of Bolivia. Pando, who ascended to the rank of General on the same day, did not sign the decree because he considered it imprudent and contrary to the goal of pacifying the country.

The National Convention was installed in Oruro on October 20, 1899. Its goal was to elect a new president. But first, the assembled delegates recognized the Constitution of 1880 as the binding law of the land. Nonetheless, they left open the possibility of a fundamental or partial reform of the constitution, if supported by a simple majority of votes and subject to the legal requirements set out in the constitution.

General Pando was elected President of Bolivia on October 23, 1899, with Lucio Pérez Velasco as his First Vice President and Aníbal Capriles as his second Vice President.
