= Anastasio Villazón =

Personal details
- Born: November 18, 1788 Cartagena de Indias, Viceroyalty of New Granada
- Died: March 31, 1852 Cochabamba, Bolivia
- Spouse: Teresa Rojas Monsalve
- Relations: Eliodoro Villazón; Manuel Terrazas
- Children: 2
- Parent(s): Manuel Villazón Lluch; Benedicta Ramallo Posada
- Education: Pontificia Universidad Javeriana

Military service
- Allegiance: Bolivia
- Branch/service: Bolivian Army
- Years of service: 1812-1830
- Rank: Brigadier general
- Battles/wars: Spanish American wars of independence; Battle of Junin

Brigadier General Anastasio Villazón (18 November 1788 – 31 March 1852) was a Bolivian military officer who served during the Spanish American Wars of Independence. He was a relative of Bolivian President Eliodoro Villazón, who also served as Vicepresident.

== Early life and education ==
Anastasio Villazón was the son of Manuel Villazón Lluch and Benedicta Ramallo Posada. He was born in Cartagena de Indias on November 18, 1788. His father was a local politician and his mother was the daughter of Colonel Francisco de Paula Ramallo Quiroga. He spent most of his youth in Cartagena, spending some time in France and Spain. He stayed with his uncle, Fadrique Ramallo Posada, in Sevilla between 1802 and 1805.

He was educated at the Pontificia Universidad Javeriana, where he graduated as a lawyer in 1812. During his time at the university, he joined the movement to overthrow the Spanish regime in the Americas. By the time he graduated, the Constitution of Cádiz was promulgated and he became an ardent supporter of the cause for independence. Although his relatives were royalists, he left Cartagena to enlist in the army of Simón Bolívar.

== Wars of Spanish American Independence ==
Villazón participated in the campaign of Liborio Mejía, who was proclaimed President of New Granada on June 22, 1816. Having played a role in this event, Villazón was promoted to the rank of captain. On September 16, the Spanish reconquered New Granada and executed Mejía alongside other rebels. Villazón was captured by Spanish troops and was taken to Cartagena as a prisoner.

Villazón escaped his prisoners in 1817, heading toward the Orinoco delta. He rejoined the Bolivarian army and participated in the Battle of Vargas Swamp on July 25, 1819, securing the independence of the Republic of New Granada and assuring the Congress of Angostura prevailed. A few days later, he again saw action at the Battle of Boyacá on August 7. Wounded and nearly killed, Villazón was again captured by royalist forces. He spent seven months jailed in Cuba until the release of republican prisoners was secured.

Returning to Cartagena and marrying, he continued the march south to Peru. By 1823, he was a major and was given command of the battalion Esperanza which was tasked with joining the attack toward Lima. Villazón was not present in the Battle of Ayacucho because he was tasked with marching toward La Paz. He did see action at the Combat of Uripa, after which he was promoted to lieutenant colonel. By 1824, he was with General Francisco O’Connor in what is now Bolivia. He played a role in securing the withdrawal of remaining royalist forces in Upper Peru. For his actions, he was promoted to colonel. When he entered Cochabamba in November 1824, he was welcomed by the people and granted lands near Cochabamba.

In 1829, he was promoted to brigadier general for supporting the overthrow of Pedro Blanco Soto. However, Villazón was critical of now President José Miguel de Velasco. His open insults to Velasco resulted in his removal from the military list of Bolivia. Although restored in 1839, Villazón did not return to active service and retired to his lands in Tarata.

== Marriage and family ==
Villazón returned to Cartagena after his second imprisonment where he married Teresa Rojas Monsalve on November 11, 1820. The couple had two sons: José Ignacio and Paula. His family followed him to Bolivia, and when the war ended they remained near Cochabamba.

== Later years and death ==
Villazón died in Cochabamba on March 31, 1854, aged 63. He spent the last decades of his life retired from military service. Although he did serve as Prefect of Cochabamba briefly in 1845. He supported the policies of President José Ballivián, who was overthrown in 1847. After 1847, Villazón remained politically inactive until his death.
