= Lucio Pérez Velasco =

Bolivian politician (1854–1904)

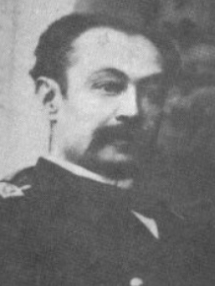

13th Vice President of Bolivia
- First Vice President
- In office 25 October 1899 – 23 January 1903 Serving with Aníbal Capriles Cabrera
- President: José Manuel Pando
- Preceded by: Rafael Peña de Flores
- Succeeded by: Eliodoro Villazón

Personal details
- Born: 2 March 1854 La Paz, Bolivia
- Died: 27 November 1904 (aged 50) La Paz, Bolivia
- Party: Liberal
- Parents: José María Velasco (father); Salustiana Pérez (mother)

Lucio Pérez Velasco (2 March 1854 – 27 November 1904) was a Bolivian politician who served as the 13th vice president of Bolivia from 1899 to 1903. He served as first vice president alongside second vice president Aníbal Capriles Cabrera during the administration of José Manuel Pando. By decree of 23 January 1903, Velasco was dismissed and Cabrera became sole vice president. A member of the Liberal Party, Velasco was elected deputy for the Beni department in 1884. From 1889 to 1893, he was Senator for Beni.

Political offices
Preceded by Rafael Peña de Flores	Vice President of Bolivia; First Vice President; 1899–1903; Served alongside: Aníbal Capriles Cabrera	Succeeded by Eliodoro Villazón
