= Jenaro Sanjinés =

Bolivian lawyer, teacher, journalist, and politician (1843–1913)

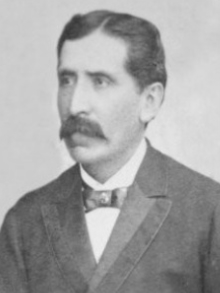

12th Vice President of Bolivia
- Second Vice President
- In office 19 August 1896 – 12 April 1899 Serving with Rafael Peña de Flores
- President: Severo Fernández
- Preceded by: Serapio Reyes Ortiz
- Succeeded by: Aníbal Capriles Cabrera

Personal details
- Born: Jenaro Sanjinés Calderón; 19 September 1843 Coroico, Bolivia
- Died: 1 December 1913 (aged 70) Sucre, Bolivia
- Political party: Conservative

Jenaro Sanjinés Calderón (19 September 1843 – 1 December 1913) was a Bolivian lawyer, teacher, journalist, and politician who served as the 12th vice president of Bolivia from 1896 to 1899. He also served as second vice president alongside first vice president Rafael Peña de Flores during the administration of Severo Fernández.

Political offices
Preceded by Serapio Reyes Ortiz	Vice President of Bolivia; Second Vice President; 1896–1890; Served alongside: Rafael Peña de Flores	Succeeded by Aníbal Capriles Cabrera
