= 1888 Bolivian general election =

- 1888
- Presidential election
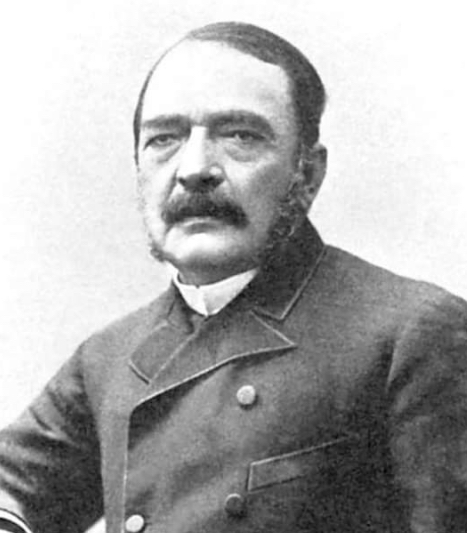

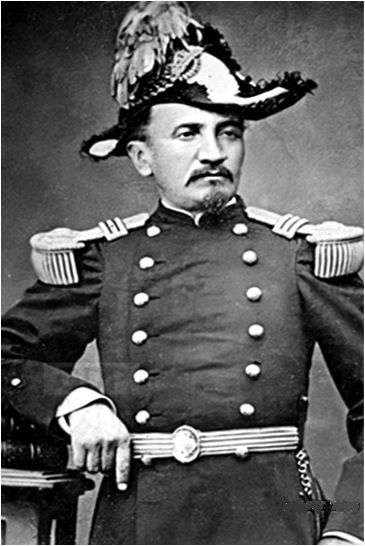
Candidate	Aniceto Arce	Eliodoro Camacho
Party	Conservative	Liberal
Popular vote	25,396	7,183
Percentage	77.95%	22.05%
President before election
Gregorio Pacheco
Elected President
Aniceto Arce

General elections were held in Bolivia in 1888. Aniceto Arce of the Conservative Party was elected president with 80% of the vote. The election campaign was characterized by violence.

== Background ==
In the 1884 elections, no presidential candidate won an absolute majority of the public vote, resulting in the President being elected by Congress. Gregorio Pacheco of the Democratic Party was elected after the Conservatives decided to support Pacheco. Their decision followed an agreement between Mariano Baptista of the Conservative Party and Jorge Oblitas and Casimiro Corral of the Liberal Party that Pacheco would work to support Conservative candidate Aniceto Arce in the next elections in 1888.

== Results ==
=== President ===
Candidate	Party	Votes	%
Aniceto Arce	Conservative Party	25,396	77.95
Eliodoro Camacho	Liberal Party	7,183	22.05
Total		32,579	100.00
Source: OEP
