= Federico Díez de Medina =

Bolivian politician

Federico Díez de Medina (1839–1904) was born in La Paz, Bolivia. Bolivian Minister of Foreign Relations and Worship (1898, 1900–1901) and Dean of the Universidad Mayor de La Paz (1878). Politician and writer, he served as Bolivian ambassador throughout South America. He wrote several texts on international law, politics, and international relations.

Political offices
Preceded by Demetrio Calvimonte	Foreign Minister of Bolivia; 1900–1902	Succeeded by Eliodoro Villazón
