= 1931 Bolivian general election =

General elections were held in Bolivia on 4 January 1931, electing both a new President of the Republic and a new National Congress. Held in the aftermath of the 1930 Bolivian coup d'état, only the Salamanca-Tejada ticket was allowed to run by the military junta then in power.

== Results ==
=== President ===
| Candidate | Running mate | Party | Votes | % |
|---|---|---|---|---|
| Daniel Salamanca Urey (PRG) | José Luis Tejada Sorzano (PL) | PRG–PL | 38,282 | 100.00 |
| Total | | | 38,282 | 100.00 |
| Valid votes | | | 38,282 | 98.17 |
| Invalid/blank votes | | | 715 | 1.83 |
| Total votes | | | 38,997 | 100.00 |
Source: Mesa

=== Congress ===
| Party | Seats | |
| Party | Chamber | Senate |
|---|---|---|
| Liberal Party | 26 | 10 |
| Genuine Republican Party | 28 | 5 |
| Republican Party | 9 | 1 |
| Nationalist Party | 3 | 0 |
| Independents | 2 | 0 |
| Total | 68 | 16 |
Source: Political handbook of the world 1932
