= José Carrasco Torrico =

Bolivian lawyer, journalist and politician

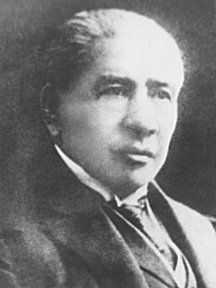

19th Vice President of Bolivia
- Second Vice President
- In office 14 August 1913 – 15 August 1917 Serving with Juan Misael Saracho
- President: Ismael Montes
- Preceded by: Juan Misael Saracho
- Succeeded by: José Santos Quinteros

Personal details
- Born: 4 November 1863 Totora, Bolivia
- Died: 24 May 1921 (aged 57) La Paz, Bolivia
- Party: Liberal
- Education: University of San Simón

José Carrasco Torrico (4 November 1863 – 24 May 1921) was a Bolivian lawyer, journalist and politician who served as the 19th vice president of Bolivia from 1913 to 1917. He served as second vice president alongside first vice president Juan Misael Saracho during the second administration of Ismael Montes.

== Biography ==
José Carrasco Torrico was born on 4 November 1863 in Totora. He studied law at the University of San Simón, graduating in 1885. He was Dean of the Faculty of Law of said university. Much of his life was devoted to journalism as director-founder of "El Comercio" of Cochabamba and "El Diario" of La Paz.

He became an important member of the Liberal Party, entering Congress as a Deputy from 1888 to 1889. He held a long public life, being elected Senior Officer of the Ministry of War in 1899, Prefect of the department of Oruro in 1900, Senator between 1904 and 1909, and Deputy in 1910. In 1913, he was elected second vice president during the second administration of Ismael Montes.

He died in La Paz on 24 May 1921.

Political offices
Preceded by Juan Misael Saracho	Vice President of Bolivia; Second Vice President; 1913–1917; Served alongside: Juan Misael Saracho	Succeeded by José Santos Quinteros
