= Juan Misael Saracho =

Bolivian journalist and politician (1857–1915)

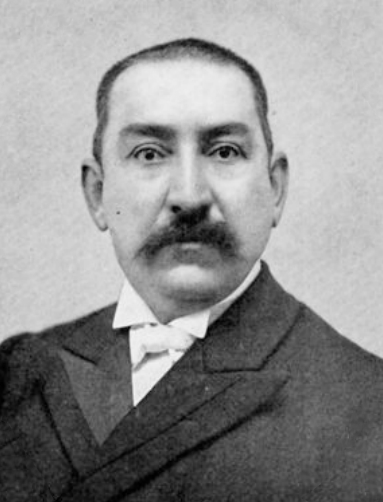

18th Vice President of Bolivia
- First Vice President
- In office 14 August 1913 – 1 October 1915 Serving with José Carrasco Torrico
- President: Ismael Montes
- Preceded by: Macario Pinilla Vargas
- Succeeded by: Ismael Vázquez Virreira
- Second Vice President
- In office 12 August 1909 – 14 August 1913 Serving with Macario Pinilla Vargas
- President: Eliodoro Villazón
- Preceded by: Valentín Abecia Ayllón
- Succeeded by: José Carrasco Torrico

Foreign Minister of Bolivia
- In office 24 December 1914 – 4 March 1915
- President: Ismael Montes
- Preceded by: José Cupertino Arteaga
- Succeeded by: Plácido Sánchez
- In office 21 September 1911 – 29 January 1913
- President: Eliodoro Villazón
- Preceded by: Claudio Pinilla
- Succeeded by: Alfredo Ascarrunz Peláez
- In office 22 January 1911 – 17 April 1911
- President: Eliodoro Villazón
- Preceded by: José María Escalier
- Succeeded by: Claudio Pinilla
- In office 9 August 1908 – 30 November 1908; Acting
- President: Ismael Montes
- Preceded by: Claudio Pinilla
- Succeeded by: Benedicto Gómez Goytia y Rodo
- In office 27 November 1906 – 30 December 1907; Acting
- President: Ismael Montes
- Preceded by: Claudio Pinilla
- Succeeded by: Claudio Pinilla
- In office 31 December 1903 – 1 February 1904; Acting
- President: José Manuel Pando
- Preceded by: Claudio Pinilla
- Succeeded by: Claudio Pinilla

Personal details
- Born: Juan Misael Saracho Campero; 27 January 1857 Tarija, Bolivia
- Died: 1 October 1915 (aged 58) Tupiza, Bolivia
- Party: Liberal
- Spouse: Rosaura Gutiérrez Loria
- Education: University of Saint Francis Xavier

Juan Misael Saracho Campero (27 January 1857 – 1 October 1915) was a Bolivian lawyer, journalist and politician who served as the 18th vice president of Bolivia from 1909 to 1915. He first served as second vice president alongside first vice president Macario Pinilla Vargas during the administration of Eliodoro Villazón. Nearing the end of Villazón's term in 1913, he ran for the position of first vice president during the second presidential bid of Ismael Montes. He served as first vice president alongside second vice president José Carrasco Torrico.

As a Senator for Tarija, he was a member of the convention of 1899 which elected José Manuel Pando to the presidency. He served as Minister of Public Instruction and Justice, Government and Development, and served multiple times as Foreign Minister during the Montes and Villazón administrations.

He was proclaimed the Liberal Party candidate for the presidency in the 1917 general election but died suddenly on 1 October 1915 at age 58.

Political offices
Preceded by Claudio Pinilla	Foreign Minister of Bolivia; Acting; 1903–1904	Succeeded by Claudio Pinilla
Preceded by Claudio Pinilla	Foreign Minister of Bolivia; Acting; 1906–1907	Succeeded by Claudio Pinilla
Preceded by Claudio Pinilla	Foreign Minister of Bolivia; Acting; 1908	Succeeded by Benedicto Gómez Goytia y Rodo
Preceded by Valentín Abecia Ayllón	Vice President of Bolivia; Second Vice President; 1909–1913; Served alongside: Macario Pinilla Vargas	Succeeded by José Carrasco Torrico
Preceded by José María Escalier	Foreign Minister of Bolivia; 1911	Succeeded by Claudio Pinilla
Preceded by Claudio Pinilla	Foreign Minister of Bolivia; 1911–1913	Succeeded by Alfredo Ascarrunz Peláez
Preceded by Macario Pinilla Vargas	Vice President of Bolivia; First Vice President; 1913–1915; Served alongside: Ismael Vázquez Virreira	Succeeded by Ismael Vázquez Virreira
Preceded by José Cupertino Arteaga	Foreign Minister of Bolivia; 1914–1915	Succeeded by Plácido Sánchez
