= José Manuel Pando =

President of Bolivia from 1899 to 1904

General José Manuel Pando
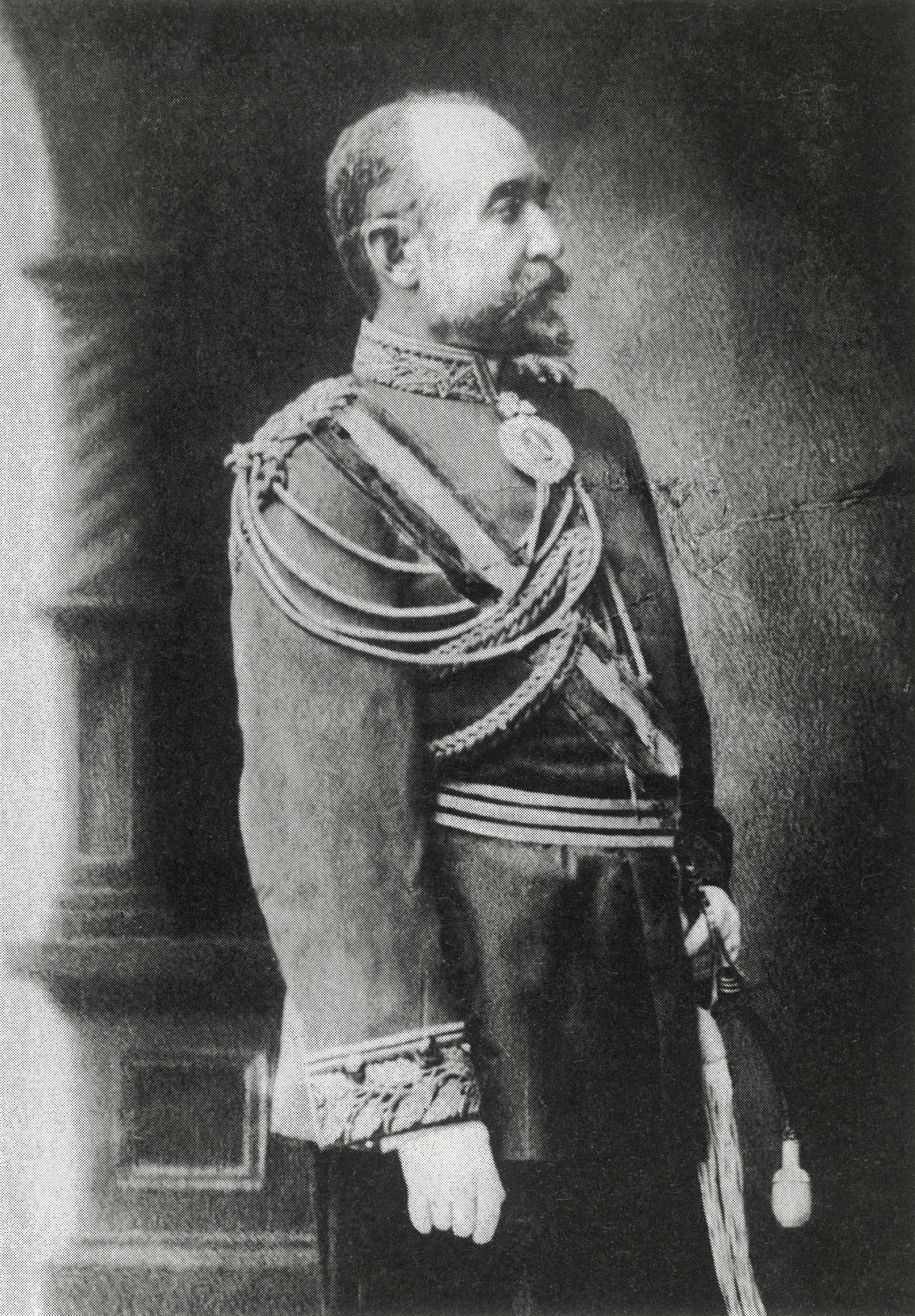
- Portrait by Luigi Domenico Gismondi, c. 1900

25th President of Bolivia
- In office 25 October 1899 – 14 August 1904
- Vice President: Lucio Pérez; Aníbal Capriles
- Preceded by: Severo Fernández
- Succeeded by: Ismael Montes

Member of the Government Junta
- In office 12 April 1899 – 25 October 1899
- Preceded by: Office established
- Succeeded by: Office dissolved

Personal details
- Born: José Manuel Inocencio Pando Solares; 27 December 1849 Luribay, La Paz Bolivia
- Died: 17 June 1917 (aged 67) La Paz, Bolivia
- Resting place: General Cemetery of La Paz
- Party: Liberal (1884–1914)
- Other political affiliations: Republican (1914–1917)
- Spouse: Carmen Guarachi Sinchi Roca
- Parents: Manuel Pando; Petrona Solares Camberos
- Education: Higher University of San Andrés

Military service
- Allegiance: Bolivia
- Branch/service: Bolivian Army
- Years of service: 1871–1899
- Rank: General
- Battles/wars: War of the Pacific; Federal War; Acre War

José Manuel Inocencio Pando Solares (27 December 1849 – 17 June 1917) was a Bolivian explorer, military officer, and politician who served as the 25th president of Bolivia from 1899 to 1904. He was a member of the Liberal Party.

He fought the so-called Acre War with Brazil, which led to Bolivia's loss of the Acre territories.

== Early life ==
=== Youth and studies ===
Pando was born in the town of Luribay on 27 December 1848. His parents were Manuel Pando and Petrona Solares. He studied at the Colegio Seminario de La Paz and continued his studies at the Universidad Mayor de San Andrés (UMSA) where he studied medicine, but only reached the sixth year before he abandoned it for a career in politics.

At the age of twenty-three, Pando fought alongside the people of La Paz to overthrow the government of Mariano Melgarejo on 15 January 1871, after which he was incorporated into the Bolivian Army.

=== Military career ===
After overthrowing Melgarejo, Bolivian President Agustín Morales appointed Pando as his personal aide-de-camp in 1871. Pando and Morales had an excellent relationship which allowed for the former's career in the army to be propelled to new heights. However, on 27 November 1872, when Morales was assassinated by his nephew and also aide-de-camp, Federico Lafaye, a heartbroken Pando resigned from the position of assistant to the President of Bolivia.

In 1876, after Hilarión Daza's deposition of President Tomas Frías, Pando retired to private life in his Luribay hacienda. However, the outbreak of the War of the Pacific called him back to arms.

During the War of the Pacific, Pando contributed to the Bolivian Army when, in the midst of the war, he took steps to bring artillery pieces from the United States, a task that General Daza had entrusted to him. Pando fought in the Battle of Alto de la Alianza on 26 May 1880, where he was seriously wounded in the left arm and taken prisoner by the Chileans and brought to Santiago. Upon his return to Bolivia, Pando led an artillery regiment until 1884.

=== Explorer and adventurer ===
Pando was one of the great explorers of Bolivia during the 19th century. Pando's explorations provided a large deal of knowledge and helped in the integration of Northern Bolivia, then known as the National Territory of Colonies (then a largely unknown and obscure part of the country). Today, this territory is composed of the departments of La Paz, Beni and Pando, the latter bears his last name in honor of his expeditions there. Several of his expeditions to the region took place around the Madidi, Madre de Dios, and Mamoré rivers, collective studies were made on the subject and published by the University of La Plata, in Argentina. Furthermore, Pando's exploration greatly contributed to Bolivia's cartography, providing crucial knowledge about uncharted lands in the Amazon rainforest.

== Political career ==
=== The Liberal Party ===
He entered as a member of the Liberal Party in 1884, a party of which he started leading after replacing General Eliodoro Camacho in 1894. He was head of the Liberal Party of Bolivia until the end of his presidency. Over the years, Pando became one of the greatest landowners of Bolivia, benefiting from the laws of 1874 and 1880.

As head of the Liberal Party, Pando was a candidate for the presidency of the republic in the 1896 general elections, being defeated by the Conservative Party and its leader, Severo Fernández. That same year, he assumed the position of senator for the Department of Chuquisaca.

==== Uprising against the Conservatives ====
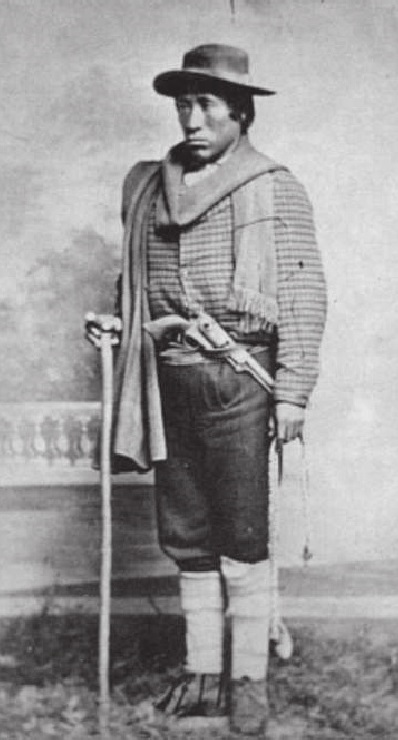
Pablo Zárate "Willka", the fearsome Aymara soldier that was crucial in the overthrow of the Conservatives in 1899.

Pando would be the leader of the Federalists when they rose up against the government in 1898, obtaining the support of the Aymaras of the country and of Colonel Pablo Zárate Willca, known as the "Fearsome Willka". Turning several officers to his cause, including Octavio La Faye and Carlos Manuel de Villegas, Pando had large following in the army. Thus, the Bolivian Civil War began. After four months of fighting, he triumphed over the conservative forces of President Fernández in the Battle of the Segundo Crucero. A Federal Government Board was created, made up of Pando, Serapio Reyes Ortiz and Macario Pinilla Vargas, which installed the seat of government in La Paz. The Board carried out some institutional reforms and public works, such as the construction of the government palace of La Paz. The Board was dissolved at the National Convention of 1899, when Pando was elected president.

== President of Bolivia ==
=== Administration ===
Pando in his official portrait as President of Bolivia in 1899.

Pando was fifty years old when he assumed the Presidency. During his administration, the first Bolivian census of the 20th century was carried out in 1900. Moreover, it was discovered that there was a surplus in the trade balance, due to the rubber boom, ensuring stability of the economy for the following decades.

Pando ordered the construction of roads going from the valleys to the plains, linking the distant settlements to the major urban centers of Bolivia in an attempt to connect the country and to improve infrastructure. Another crucial event during Pando's presidency was the arrival of the first car imported in Bolivia, brought to the country by adventurer Arthur Posnansky.

Internationally, Pando fought the so-called Acre War with Brazil. The region of Acre, located in the north and adjacent to the border with Brazil, had been invaded by Brazilian settlers and rubber tappers in the midst of a rubber boom. The Bolivian government, attempting to assert its influence in that region, founded Puerto Alonso in 1899 and established taxes on rubber tappers. But the rubber tappers rebelled and started a secessionist movement called the First Revolution of Acre, which the Bolivian government was able to crush. The second phase of this war, called the Second Acrean Revolution, occurred in 1902; this time, the Acreans asked to be annexed into Brazil. The Bolivians suffered setbacks at the hands of the Acrean revolutionaries, so Pando personally marched to Acre at the head of an army. This motivated the intervention of Brazil, which considered the area in dispute to be theirs and decided to send its army in support of the Acreans. This disparate situation forced the Bolivians to enter negotiations. Pando signed the Treaty of Petrópolis with Brazil by which Bolivia ceded territory in the north in exchange for significant financial compensation of two million pounds sterling. Shortly after returning to La Paz, at the end of his term, Pando handed over power to Ismael Montes, who succeeded him as leader of the Liberal Party.

== Later life and death ==
Pando was delegate in the territories of the North and Commissioner of Limits with Brazil. He was appointed Brigadier General in the Army of Peru in 1911. Having left the Liberal party, he broke with Ismael Montes and, in 1915, he became the founder of the Republican Party.

Retired, Pando was found dead in a ravine near El Kenko (now El Alto) on 17 June 1917. Many believed it was a political crime, perpetrated at the instigation of the Liberal Party. The murder was attributed to Alfredo Jáuregui, Juan Jáuregui, Néstor Villegas and Simón Choque. In 1927, Alfredo Jáuregui, the youngest of the brothers, was shot as a result of his alleged involvement in the crime against Pando.

Modern investigations, however, maintain that Pando's death was due to natural causes, when he suffered a stroke while he was going from his farm in Catavi to the city of La Paz. According to this hypothesis, the members of the Jáuregui family, in whose hut Pando had stayed shortly before, upon discovering the body on the road, fearing being blamed for his death, threw the body into the ravine.

== See also ==
- Pando Department
- José Manuel Pando Province

Party political offices
Preceded by Eliodoro Camacho	Leader of the Liberal Party; 1894–1904	Succeeded by Ismael Montes
Government offices
Office established	Member of the Government Junta; 1899	Office dissolved
Political offices
Preceded by Severo Fernández	President of Bolivia; 1899–1904	Succeeded by Ismael Montes
