= Willka =

Indigenous Bolivian caudillo

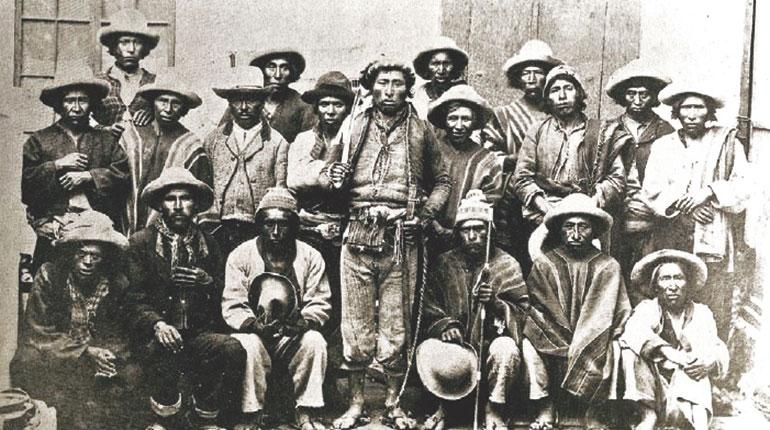
Group of peasant led by Zárate Willka, who participated in the Federal War of 1899.

Pablo Zárate Willka (died 1905), also known as Willka ("sun" in Aymara), was an indigenous Bolivian caudillo who supported federalism in defense of indigenous autonomy. He was an officer in the Bolivian army, reaching the rank of colonel, and led one of the largest indigenous rebellions in the history of Bolivia. His campaign against the Bolivian government sought land reform for the Aymara and other indigenous communities and led the resistance against the system known as "latifundium". Working together with José Manuel Pando, they formed an alliance built on mutual need and respect. Willka, a literate Aymara leader and indigenous caudillo, showed signs of success as a politician and a military leader. His political ties with kinship and local communities gave him an edge over his adversaries in the altiplano.

As talks with the Bolivian government broke down over land reform, the Liberal Party turned to Zárate Willka to mobilize his indigenous army. The insurrection hit a turning point with Zárate Willka's capture in 1899, changing the course of the resistance. Seen as a threat to the Bolivian government, he was incarcerated until his death in 1905.

Bolivia had one of the most anti-indigenous stances in all Latin America. Bolivian Conservative governmental policies were particularly malicious against the indigenous people. Initially they allowed indigenous people to keep their land but imposed heavy taxes on them without protections afforded by the Spanish colonial system. The Bolivian Conservative government then tried to assimilate the indigenous population, but what resulted was indigenous peoples being forced to buy their land from the government or be evicted off their land, which was then sold to private interests, usually for silver mining. Following this, the conservatives ousted the president and repealed all eviction laws and instead implemented the hacienda system known as latifundium. The sum of this cascade of policies attempted to turn the indigenous peoples into a slave class. Emerging from this morass of abuse arose a caudillo in the truest sense, named Pablo Zarate Willka who joined forces with federalists, represented the indigenous people of the area, and led the federalist revolution alongside Jose Manuel Pando against the conservative government.

== Legacy ==
Zarate Willka Armed Forces of Liberation (Fuerzas Armadas de Liberación Zárate Willka), a Bolivian guerrilla group organized about 1985, was named in honor of Willka.
