= Eliodoro Camacho =

Bolivian politician (1831–1899)

Eliodoro Camacho (1831–1899) was a Bolivian politician, party leader, and presidential candidate. The Eliodoro Camacho Province is named after him. Camacho was born in Inquisivi, Department of La Paz, but grew up in Cochabamba. He founded the Liberal Party, which espoused freedom of religion, a stricter separation between church and state, legal acceptance of civil marriages and divorce, and strict adherence to democratic procedures. Camacho also participated as an officer in the 1879-80 War of the Pacific against Chile, and later played a key role in the 1880 Constitutional Convention. Following the establishment of the new post-war order (which he himself authored, along with Conservative Party leader Aniceto Arce), he led the opposition against the Conservatives. He ran for president in 1884, 1888, and 1892.

Following three consecutive electoral defeats (ameliorated somewhat by the knowledge that they almost certainly were the result of various degrees of fraud), Camacho resigned the leadership of the Liberal Party in 1894 to José Manuel Pando. Under Pando, the Liberals would go on to gain power in 1899 and dominate Bolivian politics until 1920, as well as to remain one of the most important parties in the country until nearly the mid 20th century. He died in 1899.
