= Bolivian Civil War =

Armed conflict in Bolivia

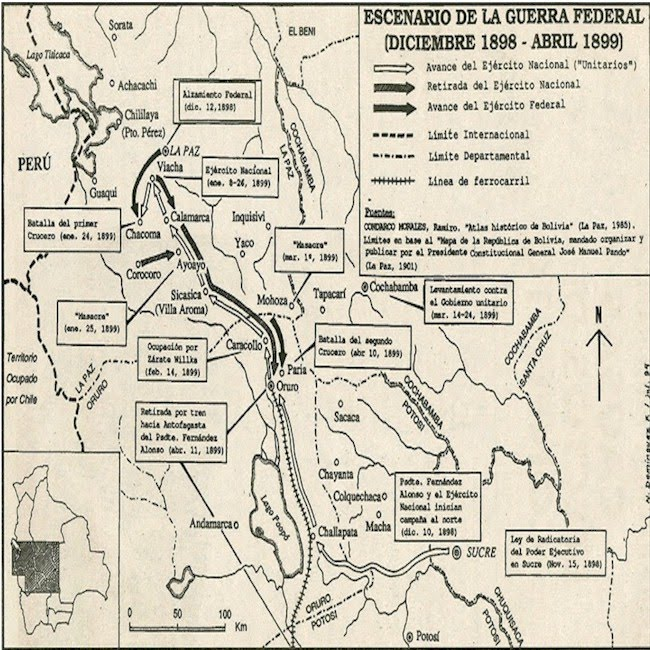
- Battle map illustrating the army movements
Date	November 6, 1898–April 10, 1899
Location	Bolivia
Result	Liberal victory: Creation of the Federal Government Junta; La Paz becomes de facto seat of government

Belligerents
Conservatives	Liberals

Commanders and leaders
Severo Fernández	José Manuel Pando; Pablo Zárate Wilka

The Bolivian Civil War, also known as the Federal War (Spanish: Guerra Federal) was a civil war in Bolivia fought from 1898 to 1899. The war saw two factions, a conservative side supported by the political, economic and religious elite of the country with control of the armed forces and who defended a unitary state, and a liberal faction opposed to the policies set by the state and that intended to transform the country into a federation, with support of the peasantry, the indigenous peoples and small Catholic businesses.

The conflict was ultimately won by the liberal side, putting an end to decades-long political rule by the Bolivian conservatives and leading to a time of political change called the federal revolution (Spanish: revolución federal). The outcome included the attempted move of the country's capital city from Sucre to La Paz, however subsequent political conflicts challenged this process eventually frustrating a complete move and also hindering the transformation into a federal republic. In consequence Sucre remained the constitutional capital, whereas La Paz became the de facto seat of government, a situation that remains in present time.

During the war, both sides committed atrocities against the civilian populace. Within the territory controlled by each faction, a surge of revolutions and counter-revolution further complicated the everyday lives of civilians. In addition, foreign interests were also present, as the liberals had strong links with Peru and the conservatives with Chile.

The post-war period was marked by the general disillusionment at the Federal Government Junta, created after the war by members of the liberal faction. While the Junta did conduct some political reforms, it largely continued the political foundations of its predecessors, including preserving the unitary state and rejecting any possibility of establishing a federal or confederal state. Additionally, the new government did not uphold the promises made to the rural and indigenous classes, and protests by them were met with oppression and executions. The most significant execution of this period was that of Pablo Zárate Wilka, an indigenous leader who had proved to be the biggest ally of the liberal faction during the war.

The political consequences of the civil war continued on during the 20th century, as its ideological bases served as foundations for subsequent political upheaval, such as the Bolivian Revolution of 1952.

== Background ==
After the defeat at the Battle of Tacna in May of 1880, Bolivia retreated from the War of the Pacific and the political elite became divided into two factions; the guerristas, who sought to resume military confrontation to at least recover some form of access to the Pacific Ocean, and the pacifistas who supported a final end to the conflict and a treaty with Chile. The former were mostly groups with strong links to the military and with commercial interests with Peru, whereas the latter were big landowners from southern Bolivia who benefitted from peace with Chile.

The guerristas and pacifistas were the immediate precursors to the Liberal and Conservative parties, respectively. The liberals were led by Eliodoro Camacho, a noted politician and veteran of the Pacific War, while the conservatives moved around the figures of Aniceto Arce, Gregorio Pacheco and Mariano Baptista, all linked to the mining industry. The victory of Pacheco in the general elections of 1883 and the pressure of the mine owners of southern Bolivia led to the signing of the Treaty of Valparaiso with Chile on 4 April 1884, which gave the heretofore Bolivian Antofagasta Province to Chile. The loss of any direct access to the sea was a heavy blow to the criollo commercial elite, as it limited the commercial opportunities of the country. The conservatives would hold political power for several successive terms: Pacheco (1884-1888), Arce (1888-1892), Baptista (1892-1896). In the general election of 1896, Severo Fernández was elected president.

Each political faction became strong regionally, the liberals held political power and influence in the cities of La Paz, Cochabamba and Oruro, whereas the conservatives were strong in the mining regions of Sucre and Potosí. Among the liberals there were members of the emerging commercial and industrial bourgeoisie, academics, lawyers and writers, whereas the conservatives were most of all bankers, members of the political elite, aristocrats, big landowners and clergy. The frequent abuse of power by the conservative authorities and the expansion of big landowners in the rural areas at the expense of the traditional indigenous communities increased popular support for the liberals, particularly among the Aymara ayllu communities of the Altiplano. The liberal leaders promised a reversal of the Agrarian Law of 1874 and the recovery of the lost lands, further increasing indigenous support to their cause, despite the fact that many prominent liberal figures were in fact the beneficiaries of said law.

By the late 19th century, La Paz had become in the hegemonical region of the country, especially after the collapse of the gold mining industry in favour of that of tin. Lacking the mining or the agrarian resources of other regions, the economy of La Paz was more diversified, with important commercial links to Peru. Sucre, being both the capital city and a conservative stronghold benefited from significant investments, but as the economic weight of La Paz increased, the desire of its economic and political elites to control the country's finances grew bigger.

== Ley Radicatoria of 1898 ==
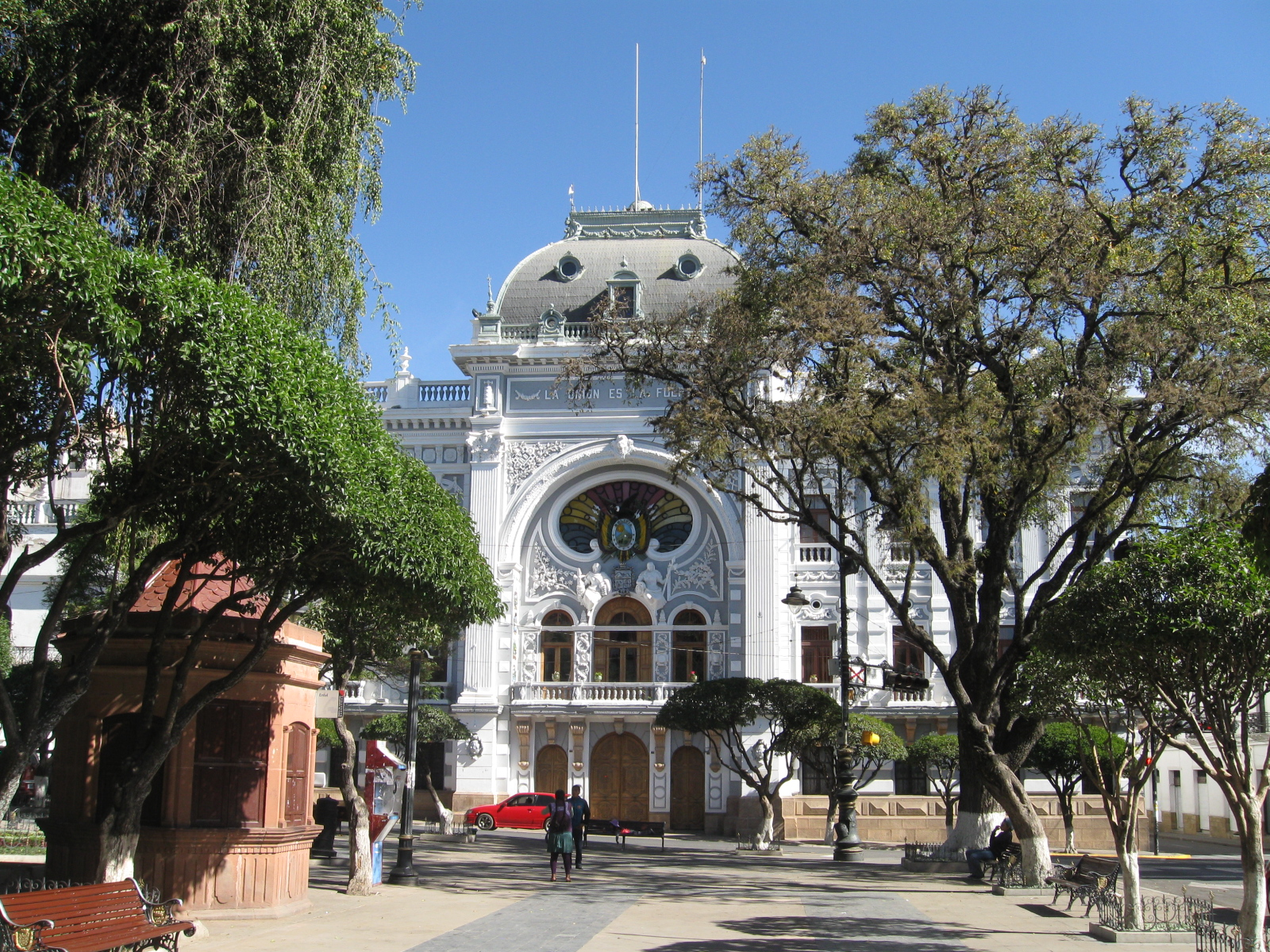
Palace of Government in Sucre.

Severo Fernández was a conservative who had been elected president of Bolivia after the general elections of 1896. During his mandate, Fernández intended to put an end of "problem of the capital": until 1880 the seat of the executive and legislative power was located wherever the president resided. In consequence, since achieving independence in 1825 and until 1898 Congress had met 29 times in Sucre, 20 in La Paz, 7 in Oruro, 2 in Cochabamba and once in Tapacarí. Officially, the capital city was set in the city of Sucre, which had also been the capital of the Real Audiencia of Charcas during colonial times. The capital had not been moved due to a combination of financial challenges involved and the influence of the local aristocracy. Starting in 1880, the conservative governments started to reside permanently in Sucre, making it the de facto capital.

On 31 October 1898 the members of Congress in Sucre proposed a bill named ley radicatoria that effectively set the executive power in Sucre. The congress members from La Paz, however, proposed moving to the city of Cochabamba instead, as it was a more neutral choice, but the government rejected the idea. The liberals had decided to seemingly support Sucre as the capital city with the aim of provoking the La Paz elites to rebel against the conservative government. On 6 November there was a big demonstration in La Paz demanding both federalism and the definitive move of all branches of government to the city. On 14 November a Federal Committee was created, presided by the army colonel José Manuel Pando, while the liberals took advantage of the upheaval to propose full economic and political autonomy for all departments. Three days later however, the ley radicatoria was approved and Sucre was set as the only capital city of Bolivia, that was to remain a centralist, unitary state.

In response, on 12 December, supported by the local population of La Paz, a Federal Junta made of members of the liberal party was created, effectively setting a scenario where two active governments existed in the country, one in Sucre and another in La Paz. Some political authorities recognised the political authority of the Junta, like La Paz governor Serapio Reyes Ortiz and the minister Macario Pinilla. The liberals were led by Pando, who received support from the Altiplano indigenous communities, led by the cacique Pablo Zárate Willka, giving way to an unprecedented situation in which a federal revolution led by criollos happened simultaneously and in alliance with an indigenous revolt.

== Course of the war ==
=== 1898 ===
Following the orders of the Federal Junta, the congress members from La Paz returned to the city, where they were received in clamor by the locals. The Federal Junta set as ultimate objective the establishment of a federal government and the overthrow of conservative president Severo Fernández. Meanwhile, in Sucre public demonstrations in favour of the conservative government were held.

Fernández decided to march to La Paz leading three military squadrons, Bolívar, Junín and Húasares. While at Challapata the president was informed that the liberal rebels had obtained more than 2,000 weapons, making a popular resistance in the city feasible. In consequence, the conservatives asked for volunteers in Sucre to join the war efforts. The reinforcements arrived to Oruro by 14 December, where military preparations were set. Two brigades were created, the first one comprising the 25th of May battalion and the Sucre squadron, made up of high-class men with houses and weapons of their own property. The second brigade, comprising the Olañeta battalion and Monteagudo squadron, was composed of lower-class members. During the march to La Paz several indigenous communities were sacked.

=== 1899 ===
The first brigade met the liberal forces in Cosmini on 24 January and were forced to retreat to Ayo Ayo, where they were massacred. By this time, news of the battles taking place traveled across the country; the city of Potosí positioned itself in support of the conservative government, while the departments of eastern and southern Bolivia opted for neutrality. In the rural areas of La Paz, Cochabamba, Oruro and Potosí indigenous revolts in support of the liberal side took place.

The decisive battle took place in the small town of Segundo Crucero de Paria, on 10 April 1899, where the conservative president Fernández and the liberal colonel Pando met face to face, with a victory of the latter after four hours of battle. After the defeat, the remaining conservative forces retreated back to Oruro, while Fernández was exiled to Chile.

== Consequences ==
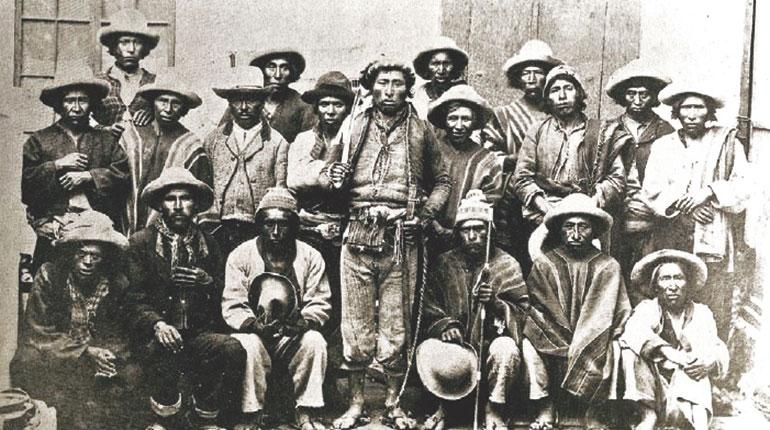
Zárate Willka and a group of Andean indigenous fighters.

The war was the outcome of the growing tensions between the political elites of La Paz and Sucre and represented the shift in political power from the south to the north of the country and the beginning of the political and economic hegemony of La Paz. The main outcome of the war was the definite transfer of political power from Sucre to La Paz, which became the de facto seat of government. However, the liberal victory did not have any relevant social consequences, nor did it culminate in the transformation of Bolivia into a federal state. After the war, the indigenous and mestizo populations of the country realised that the aristocratic criollo elites did not intend to return any lands back, and thus started an estrangement between these groups. This process had already started during the course of the war, when in many occasions indigenous squadrons disobeyed the orders of criollo leaders and committed atrocities against civilian populations.

According to the 1901 census, the Bolivian population was distributed between 800,000 indigenous peoples -mostly Quechua and Aymara, 100,000 mestizos or cholos and 200,000 criollos or whites that controlled the political, cultural and economic power of the country. The criollo elite differentiated between the indigenous peoples, considering the Quechua to be more civilised than the Aymaras, who were often involved in revolts and uprisings. The criollo population feared an indigenous social revolution and thus began closing ranks to assure that political power was not lost. After the war, indigenous revolts took place demanding the upholding of the promised made by the liberals to the indigenous populations in exchange for their participation in the conflict. In response, the indigenous cacique Pablo Zárate Willka, who had been elevated to the rank of general in the liberal army, was arrested. Zárate Wilka escaped his imprisonment in 1903 but was captured again and executed without due process two years later.

The indigenous people of the Altiplano were left to become once again servants (Quechua: yanakuna) for big landowners, working without pay for 3 to 5 days every week, only in exchange of being able to work during their free time and benefit from a smaller piece land that hitherto had belonged to them. The Altiplano countryside had thus re-established a semi-feudal society, where the indigenous peoples lived a community life subordinated to the norms and rulings of the landlord. The indigenous tribes of the Chaco region began to suffer the violence of the military, which supported the expansion of big farmers; many indigenous peoples, most of them Guaraní, were captured and forced to work on sugar cane plantations, often in conditions far worse than those of their Andean counterparts. Lastly, the indigenous peoples of the Bolivian Amazon saw their little autonomy finished after the liberal governments authorised the exploitation of their lands to produce rubber; many were captured and sold as forced laborers for the production of latex, or else were displaced from their lands by the arrival of criollo or mestizo settlers.
