= Liberal Party (Bolivia) =

Political party in Bolivia from 1883 to 1979

Liberal Party Partido Liberal
- Abbreviation: PL
- Founder: Eliodoro Camacho
- Founded: 1883; 143 years ago
- Dissolved: 29 April 1979; 47 years ago
- Headquarters: La Paz
- Ideology: Liberalism (Bolivian); Classical liberalism
- Political position: 1883–1899: Left-wing; 1899–1947: Centre-left; 1947–1952: Centre to centre-right 1952–1979: Centre-right to right-wing
- National affiliation: Democratic Institutionalist Alliance (1966); Nationalist Union of the People (1978)

The Liberal Party (Spanish: Partido Liberal; PL) was a liberal political party in Bolivia active between 1883 and 1979. It was one of two major parties, alongside the Conservative Party, that dominated the politics of Bolivia from 1884 to 1920. The Liberals constituted the primary opposition to the Conservatives from 1884 to 1899 and ruled continuously from 1899 to 1920 after taking power in the Federal War. Liberal rule ended in 1920 when the party was ousted in a coup d'état. The Liberals remained intermittently influential and electorally competitive until the Bolivian National Revolution of 1952, and it finally lost its legal party status in 1979, during the democratic transition.

== History ==
The Liberal Party was formally founded in 1883 by Eliodoro Camacho. The party espoused freedom of religion, a strict separation between church and state, legal acceptance of civil marriages and divorce, and strict adherence to democratic procedures. When the party took power in 1899, it moved the base of the presidency and the Congress to La Paz, which became the de facto capital city. The Supreme Court remained in Sucre. To this day, Sucre is the de jure capital of Bolivia while La Paz acts as the de facto seat of government.

Between 1899 and 1920, all of the presidents of Bolivia were members of the Liberal Party, supported by the tin-mining oligarchy until the Republican Party took power in a coup in 1920.

The last Liberal president was José Luis Tejada Sorzano, who served between 1934 and 1936.

By 1940, however, the party had formed a Concordance with their erstwhile Republican opponents to counter the rising tide of radical or revolutionary parties. The Concordance supported the candidate Enrique Peñaranda.

In 1947, the Liberal Party's Luis Fernando Guachalla narrowly lost to Enrique Hertzog of the Republican Socialist Unity Party (PURS).

In the 1951 elections, Tomás Manuel Elío ran for the Liberal Party but received far fewer votes than the winner.

For the 1966 elections, the Liberal Party was a component of the Democratic Institutionalist Alliance, with the PURS's Enrique Hertzog as the coalition's presidential candidate and the PL's leader, Eduardo Montes, as his running mate. They polled 11,400 votes (01.13%) and came sixth.

For the 1978 election, the PL fostered relations with the Nationalist Union of the People (UNP) and its candidate, Juan Pereda. The party put forward Montes as Pereda's running mate but was passed over in favor of Alfredo Franco. As a result, the PL scrambled to form its own ticket, nominating Montes for president, accompanied by Raúl Monje for vice president. The party failed to meet the filing deadline for ballot access and was consequently barred from competing by the Electoral Court. It ultimately resigned to endorsing Pereda's candidacy.

When elections were rerun in 1979, the PL was among several minor fronts not granted legal party status by electoral authorities. On 29 April 1979, the Electoral Court announced that the PL and sixteen other parties had not met the necessary prerequisites to be allowed ballot access, rendering them effectively defunct.

== Electoral history ==
Electoral history of the Liberal Party
Year	Presidential nominee	Votes			Result	Ref.
Year	Presidential nominee	Total	%	P.	Result	Ref.
1884	Eliodoro Camacho	8,202	27.14%	3rd	Lost	
1888	Eliodoro Camacho	7,183	20.86%	2nd	Lost	
1892	Eliodoro Camacho	10,607		2nd	Lost	
1896	José Manuel Pando	16,709	45.60%	2nd	Lost	
1904	Ismael Montes	32,884	76.45%	1st	Won	
1908	Fernando Eloy G.	24,017		1st	Annulled	
1909	Eliodoro Villazón	32,543	93.50%	1st	Won	
1913	Ismael Montes	77,731	98.86%	1st	Won	
1917	José Gutiérrez G.	73,705	88.09%	1st	Won	
1925	Daniel Salamanca			2nd	Annulled	
1931	Daniel Salamanca	38,282	78.76%	1st	Won	
1934	Juan María Zalles	6,642	40.78%	2nd	Annulled	
1940	Enrique Peñaranda	58,060	85.99%	1st	Won	
1947	Luis F. Guachalla	43,634	46.74%	2nd	Lost	
1951	Tomás M. Elío	6,530	5.18%	5th	Annulled	
1966	Enrique Hertzog	11,330	1.13%	6th	Lost	
1978	Eduardo Montes	Disqualified			Lost	
Source: Mesa Gisbert 2016, pp. 168–228, 413–416

== See also ==
- History of Bolivia (1809–1920)
