= Cabinet of José Ballivián =

Bolivian presidential administration and ministerial cabinet from 1841 to 1847

Cabinet of José Ballivián Ballivián Cabinet
- 12th–14th Cabinet of the Bolivian Republic
- 1841–1847
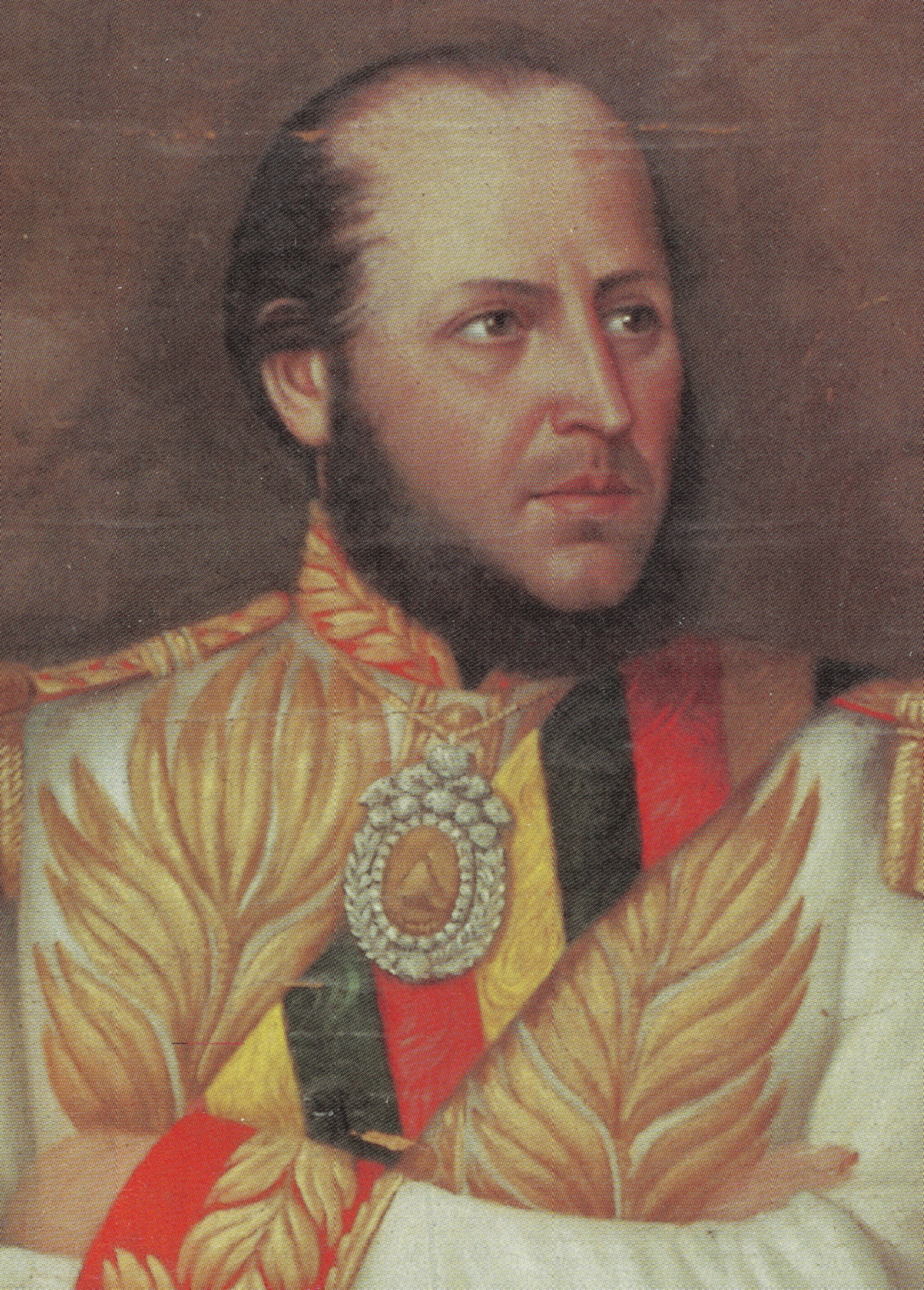
- Date formed: 18 October 1841
- Date dissolved: 23 December 1847 (6 years, 2 months and 5 days)

People and organisations
- President: José Ballivián
- No. of ministers: 4
- Total no. of members: 14 (incl. former members)

History
- Election: 1844 general election
- Predecessor: Third Cabinet of José Miguel de Velasco (Note: The governments of Sebastián Ágreda and Mariano Enrique Calvo which preceded Ballivián did not last long enough to constitute ministerial cabinets.)
- Successor: Cabinet of Eusebio Guilarte

The Ballivián Cabinet, which comprised the 12th to 14th cabinets of the Bolivian Republic, came into being on 18 October 1841. This was 21 days after José Ballivián assumed office as the 9th president of Bolivia, following a coup d'état that saw him take over from the Third Velasco Cabinet. The cabinet continued to serve until 23 December 1847, when Ballivián resigned from office, and it was subsequently dissolved. Cabinet of Eusebio Guilarte succeeded the Ballivián Cabinet.

== Composition ==
Portfolio	Minister	Party	Prof.	Took office	Left office	Term	Ref.
President	José Ballivián	Mil.	Mil.	27 September 1841	15 August 1844	2,278	
President	José Ballivián	Mil.	Mil.	15 August 1844	23 December 1847	2,278	
Minister of the Interior and Foreign Affairs	Manuel María Urcullu	Ind.	Mag.	18 October 1841	25 April 1842	189	
Minister of the Interior and Foreign Affairs	Casimiro Olañeta	Ind.	Law.	25 April 1842	25 June 1842	61	
Minister of the Interior and Foreign Affairs	Manuel de la Cruz Méndez	Ind.	Law.	25 June 1842	4 November 1842	132	
Minister of the Interior	Eusebio Gutierrez	Ind.	Law.	4 November 1842	19 June 1843	227	
Minister of the Interior	Pedro Buitrago	Ind.	Mag.	19 June 1843	9 August 1845	782	
Minister of the Interior	Pedro José de Guerra	Ind.	Mag.	9 August 1845	25 November 1847	838	
Minister of the Interior	Tomás Frías (Note: Acting for José Ugarte who never took office.)	Ind.	Law.	25 November 1847	23 December 1847	28	(Note: President N° 17 (twice president).)
Secretary General (Note: Exerts command of all ministerial portfolios while the respective ministries are organized.)	José María Pérez de Urdininea	Mil.	Mil.	27 September 1841	18 October 1841	262	(Note: President N° 3.)
Minister of War	José María Pérez de Urdininea	Mil.	Mil.	18 October 1841	16 June 1842	262	
Minister of War	Eusebio Guilarte	Mil.	Mil.	16 June 1842	18 November 1842	155	(Note: President N° 10.)
Minister of War	Manuel Zagárnaga	Mil.	Mil.	18 November 1842	4 October 1843	320	
Minister of War	José María Pérez de Urdininea	Mil.	Mil.	4 October 1843	14 October 1843	10	
Minister of War	José María Silva	Mil.	Mil.	14 October 1843	25 November 1847	1,503	
Minister of War	Eusebio Guilarte	Mil.	Mil.	25 November 1847	2 January 1848	38	(Note: Ballivián + Guilarte.)
Minister of Finance	Tomás Frías	Ind.	Law.	18 October 1841	27 December 1841	70	
Minister of Finance	Hilarión Fernandez	Mil.	Mil.	27 December 1841	28 April 1843	487	
Minister of Finance	Manuel Molina	Ind.	Law.	28 April 1843	19 March 1844	326	
Minister of Finance	Tomás Frías	Ind.	Law.	19 March 1844	17 August 1844	151	
Minister of Finance	Miguel María de Aguirre	Ind.	Eco.	17 August 1844	23 December 1847	1,223	
Minister of Public Instruction	Office vacant 27 September 1841 – 4 November 1842					403	
Minister of Public Instruction and Foreign Affairs	Manuel de la Cruz Méndez	Ind.	Law.	4 November 1842	28 November 1844	755	
Minister of Public Instruction and Foreign Affairs	Tomás Frías	Ind.	Law.	28 November 1844	23 December 1847	1,120	

== History ==
When Ballivián assumed office, he assigned all ministerial duties to Division General José María Pérez de Urdininea, who acted as a temporary minister general until a proper cabinet was formed. It took 21 days, longer than expected, to appoint a full council of three ministers, which finally happened on 18 October 1841. The Ministry of Public Instruction remained unfilled for more than a year until it was reestablished on 4 November 1842. Additionally, the responsibility for foreign affairs was transferred from the interior to the Ministry of Public Instruction.

Two future presidents and one former president, José María Pérez de Urdininea (1828), Eusebio Guilarte (1847–1848), and Tomás Frías (1872–1873; 1874–1876) were members of this cabinet.

=== Cabinets ===
N°	Formed	Days	Decree
I	18 October 1841	241	Supreme Decree 18-10-1841
II	25 April 1842	193	Supreme Decree 25-04-1842
III	4 November 1842	1,847	Supreme Decree 04-11-1842
IV	25 November 1847	28	Supreme Decree 25-11-1847

=== Structural changes ===
Portfolio	Part of	Transferred to	Date	Decree
Foreign Affairs	Ministry of the Interior	Ministry of Public Instruction	4 November 1842	Supreme Decree 04-11-1842
