= Hilario Rivas Reynolds =

Bolivian military officer and Commander

Hilario Rivas
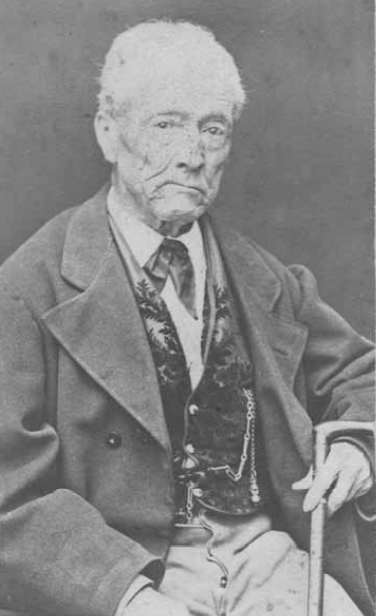
- Rivas Reynolds in his old age.

Commander of the Bolivian Army
- In office 20 April 1828 – 2 August 1828

Personal details
- Born: April 19, 1799 La Paz, Upper Peru, Viceroyalty of Peru, Spanish Empire
- Died: November 29, 1888 La Paz, Bolivia
- Spouse(s): Eloísa Cifuentes Godoy; Antígona Cisneros Guerra
- Children: Narcisco Rivas Cisneros
- Parent(s): Antonio Miguel Rivas Portillo; Juana Manuela Reynolds Carter

Military service
- Allegiance: Bolivia
- Branch/service: Bolivian Army
- Years of service: 1819-1839
- Rank: Brigadier general
- Battles/wars: Battle of Ayacucho Battle of Junin Battle of Pichincha

Hilario Remigio Rivas Reynolds (19 April 1799 – 29 November 1888) was a Bolivian military officer and Commander of the Bolivian Army during the presidency of José María Pérez de Urdininea. He was a loyal supporter of Andrés de Santa Cruz and would be one of the only military officers not to desert him before the Battle of Yungay.

== Early life ==
Rivas was the son of Antonio Miguel Rivas Portillo and Juana Manuela Reynolds Carter. At a young age, his parents arranged his marriage to the member of a prominent Upper Peruvian family, Eloísa Cifuentes Godoy. The marriage was unhappy and they had no children. Rivas would join the patriot army soon after Eloísa's family's hacienda was raided by the royalist army. The controversy regarding this matter being that her family was only suspected of having patriot sympathies. In fact, her family was loyal to the Spanish and had been raided only to obtain plunder. In protest, Rivas joined the patriot cause but soon was arrested. However, his imprisonment was rudimentary, as he was locked in a room at the Recoleta convent in Sucre. He easily fled soon afterwards and headed to New Granada.

In Bolivar's Army

He was able to enlist in Bolívar's army and participated in the battles of Pichincha, Junín, and Ayacucho. Because of his courage, he was promoted to the rank of colonel by Bolívar himself after Ayacucho. He was dispatched alongside general Pedro Blanco to crush the remnants of the royalist army in his home of Upper Peru. The final royalist army under Pedro Antonio Olañeta was soon defeated in the battle of Tumusla, in which Rivas would again distinguish himself due to his virtues and valour.

== The Bolivian Republic ==
The early years (1825–1829)

With the war of independence over, Rivas was offered Peruvian citizenship and offered the rank of brigadier general. However, he rejected and opted to remain in Upper Peru where he supported the creation of the Republic of Bolívar, later Bolivia.

Now in the service of the nascent Bolivian nation, Rivas was a staunch supporter of Bolívar and Sucre. He was with Sucre when the liberator was wounded during a mutiny by the Neogranadine army, which was stationed in Bolivia in 1828. Sucre's successor, José María Pérez de Urdininea, to whom Rivas was aide-de-camp, would promote him to brigadier general. Urdininea was only a temporary replacement for Sucre and was soon replaced by José Miguel de Velasco, who failed to convince the national congress to elect him president. Therefore, Andrés de Santa Cruz was chosen in his stead.

Santa Cruz's presidency (1829–1839)

Rivas would serve Santa Cruz loyally. However, Santa Cruz did not trust him and reduced his position and powers by isolating him and rarely involving him in plans of state. Regardless, Rivas fought valiantly and loyally by his side in the battles of Socabaya, Yanacocha, and Yungay. With Santa Cruz ousted in 1839, Rivas, having stayed loyal, found himself an enemy of general Velasco, who was now president. Velasco had betrayed Santa Cruz even before knowing the outcome of Yungay. Rivas loathed Velasco and had actually actively opposed his candidacy for the presidency in 1829.

Later in 1839, Rivas decided to leave Bolivia for Spain. He had abandoned his wife at this point and the two would not meet again. Eloísa would die in 1848.

Return to Bolivia

With his wife now deceased, Rivas inherited a sizable fortune which placed him in a better position. At the time of his return, Bolivia was under the rule of Manuel Isidoro Belzu, the charismatic and populist leader of the people. Rivas offered his services to the caudillo who accepted and charged him with the position of military governor of Oruro. It was there he met his second wife, Antígona Cisneros Guerra. They were married in 1849 and would have one son. In 1857, with the overthrow of Jorge Córdova by José María Linares, Rivas was exiled to Peru.

Because Rivas was opposed to the Linares, Achá, and Melgarejo regimes, he did not return to Bolivia until 1871, when Agustín Morales deposed Mariano Melgarejo. He was received with hostility by the new president, since Morales was a staunch enemy of Belzu and had even made an attempt at the populist caudillo's life back in 1850.

But Morales was shot dead in 1872 by his nephew and aide-de-camp, supposedly out of self defence. The new president, Tomás Frías would give Rivas the position of governor of La Paz. This would last until Hilarión Daza's coup in 1877 that deposed Frías’ civilian regime.

Under Daza, Bolivia would go to war with Chile in the infamous War of the Pacific. His son would enlist as an officer in the Bolivian Army and was killed in the Battle of Tacna, on May 26, 1880.

== Family ==
Rivas was married twice. First with Eloísa Cifuentes Godoy, with whom he had no children. The two would become estranged and eventually she would die in 1848. The marriage is said to have been an unhappy one. Second, Rivas married Antígona Cisneros Guerra in 1849, they had a son: Narciso Rivas Cisneros (15 April 1850 - 26 May 1880).
