= Gonzalo García Lanza =

Bolivian military officer (1808–1885)

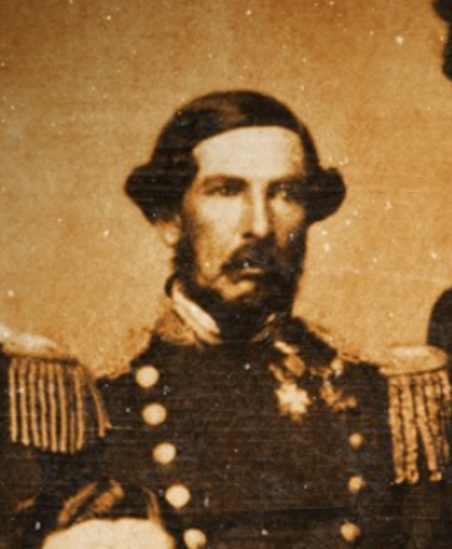

Minister of War
- In office 31 January 1853 – 21 July 1853
- President: Manuel Isidoro Belzu
- Preceded by: José Gabriel Tellez
- Succeeded by: Juan Crisóstomo Hermosa
- In office 22 December 1868 – 11 July 1869
- President: Mariano Melgarejo
- Preceded by: Nicolás Rojas
- Succeeded by: Nicolás Rojas
- In office 9 October 1869 – 15 January 1871
- President: Mariano Melgarejo
- Preceded by: Nicolás Rojas
- Succeeded by: Narciso Campero

Personal details
- Born: José Gonzalo García Lanza Campos; January 8, 1808 Coroico, Bolivia
- Died: November 20, 1885 La Paz, Bolivia
- Spouse: Juana Cortadellas
- Children: 4
- Parent(s): Gregorio García Lanza; Manuela María Campos
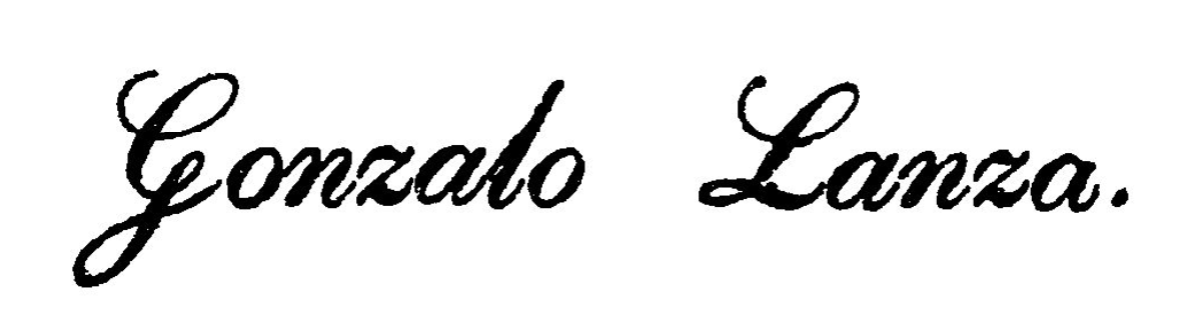
- Signature

Military service
- Allegiance: Bolivia
- Branch/service: Bolivian Army
- Rank: Major general
- Battles/wars: Spanish American wars of independence; Battle of Zepita; War of the Confederation; Battle of Yungay; Battle of Yanacocha; Battle of Ninabamba; Battle of Uchumayo; Battle of Socabaya; Peruvian–Bolivian War of 1841–42; Battle of Ingavi

Major general Gonzalo García Lanza Campos (10 January 1808 – 20 November 1885) was a Bolivian military officer who fought during the Spanish American wars of independence, the War of the Confederation, and the Peruvian–Bolivian War of 1841–42. He was also politically and militarily active in rebellions, revolutions, and civil wars. He controversially allied himself with Mariano Melgarejo in 1864 and would participate in a bloody coup in 1880, nearly bringing Bolivia to anarchy. He served as Minister of War on three different occasions.

== Early life ==
Lanza was born on January 10, 1808, the same year in which his father, Don Gregorio García Lanza, along with Pedro Domingo Murillo and other patriots, initiated the fifteen-year war to free America from the rule of Spain. His mother was the respectable matron Doña Manuela María Campos, another lady who chose to sacrifice the peace of her home and her fortune in favor of the cause of freedom. He was baptized by his uncle, Victorio Lanza, who was also martyred in that revolutionary year. At the age of seven, Lanza entered the school of San Francisco, where he acquired basic knowledge, and later continued his secondary education at the Seminario School.

== Military career ==
Lanza decided to abandon school, and on a morning in August 1823, joined the army called "Intermedios," which came from Peru under the command of General Andrés de Santa Cruz. His baptism in arms took place in the Battle of Zepita, where the cadet demonstrated energy and courage during the disastrous retreat in August 1823. In the combat of Falsuri, in October of the same year, where an intense battle was fought with fixed bayonets, with great courage and determination on the part of the patriots, Lanza showed bravery and determination, deserving the promotion to first sergeant. In 1825, he joined the first battalion of the "Guardia," the founding body of the National Army of Bolivia, alongside Ildefonso Sanjinés, Juan José Prudencio, Juan José Pérez, and Manuel Isidoro Belzu.

After the action of San Roque de Ocomisto in 1827, where the Colombian battalions "Voltígeros" and "Numancia" were defeated, Lanza obtained the insignia of first lieutenant. From this moment, his military life developed actively and intensely, standing out in the campaigns of the Peruvian-Bolivian Confederation and the Battle of Ingavi. In all these actions, Lanza distinguished himself for his bravery. Throughout his military career, he progressively rose through the ranks, participating in battles such as Yanacocha, Ninabamba, Uchumayo, and Socabaya.

At the Battle of Yungay, where the Confederation army was defeated, Lanza was captured and taken to Casas Matas, where he remained until the end of 1839. Upon returning to Bolivia, he re-joined the army and continued to serve, earning the promotion to lieutenant colonel in 1840, granted by President José Miguel de Velasco.

During the invasion of the Peruvian army led by Agustín Gamarra, Lanza was one of the most fervent and dedicated collaborators of General José Ballivián in organizing and instructing the army, standing out in the historic battle of November 18, 1841. He was the second in command of the ninth battalion, commanded by Belzu. After the Battle of Yamparáez, he was promoted to the rank of brigadier general in 1848, consolidating his position in the army.

== Marriage and family ==
In December 1829, Lanza married Juana Cortadellas. The couple had four children:

- Cesareo García Lanza Cortadellas (1830–1900)
- José Protacio García Lanza Cortadellas (1831–1877)
- Manuela Paula Felicidad García Lanza Cortadellas (1836–1908)
- Fermin Gonzalo García Lanza Cortadellas (1846–1880)

== Bolivian politics ==
Appointed Commander-General of Oruro, Lanza energetically defended the government by fighting against demagogic conspirators. In 1850, the Congress honored him with the promotion to division general and appointed him Minister of War. In 1855, he ran as a presidential candidate in rivalry with José María Linares and Jorge Córdova, later emigrating to Peru after the election of the latter. Despite being advised to work for his own cause, Lanza persisted in supporting Linares. In exile, he wrote the following:

My father has been one of the leaders of independence and one of the victims beheaded in La Paz in 1809. My uncle, General Lanza, has also fought in the war of independence and died in Chuquisaca in 1828 defending the nascent freedom of Bolivia, under the administration of General Sucre. Many of my relatives have been martyrs of the homeland. I cannot be unfaithful to the glorious traditions of my family, supporting despotism or seizing the destiny of my country by force. Those who intend to tempt my personal ambition do not know me well, as I uphold the traditions of my family in defense of public freedom.

On December 28, 1864, Melgarejo took power with the collaboration of Lanza. Loyal to Melgarejo, Lanza accompanied him in the battles of Cantería and Letanías, as well as in the barricades of La Paz. Melgarejo esteemed and respected him deeply, expressing on more than one occasion that he would pass on the presidency to him. Lanza was promoted to major general on October 22, 1865. When Melgarejo fell in 1871, Lanza retired from the army and was removed from the Ministry of War. When the War of the Pacific erupted, Lanza could not personally participate due to his advanced age and, above all, his health weakened by fifty years of service to the country. He participated in the coup d'état on March 12, 1880, but this movement failed, and Lanza, along with his accomplices, was defeated. As a result, he retired to private life, and his last years passed peacefully. He died in La Paz on November 20, 1885, at the age of 77.
