= Cabinet of José Miguel de Velasco III =

Bolivian presidential administration and ministerial cabinet from 1839 to 1841

Third Cabinet of José Miguel de Velasco Velasco III Cabinet
- 10th–11th Cabinet of the Bolivian Republic
- 1839–1841
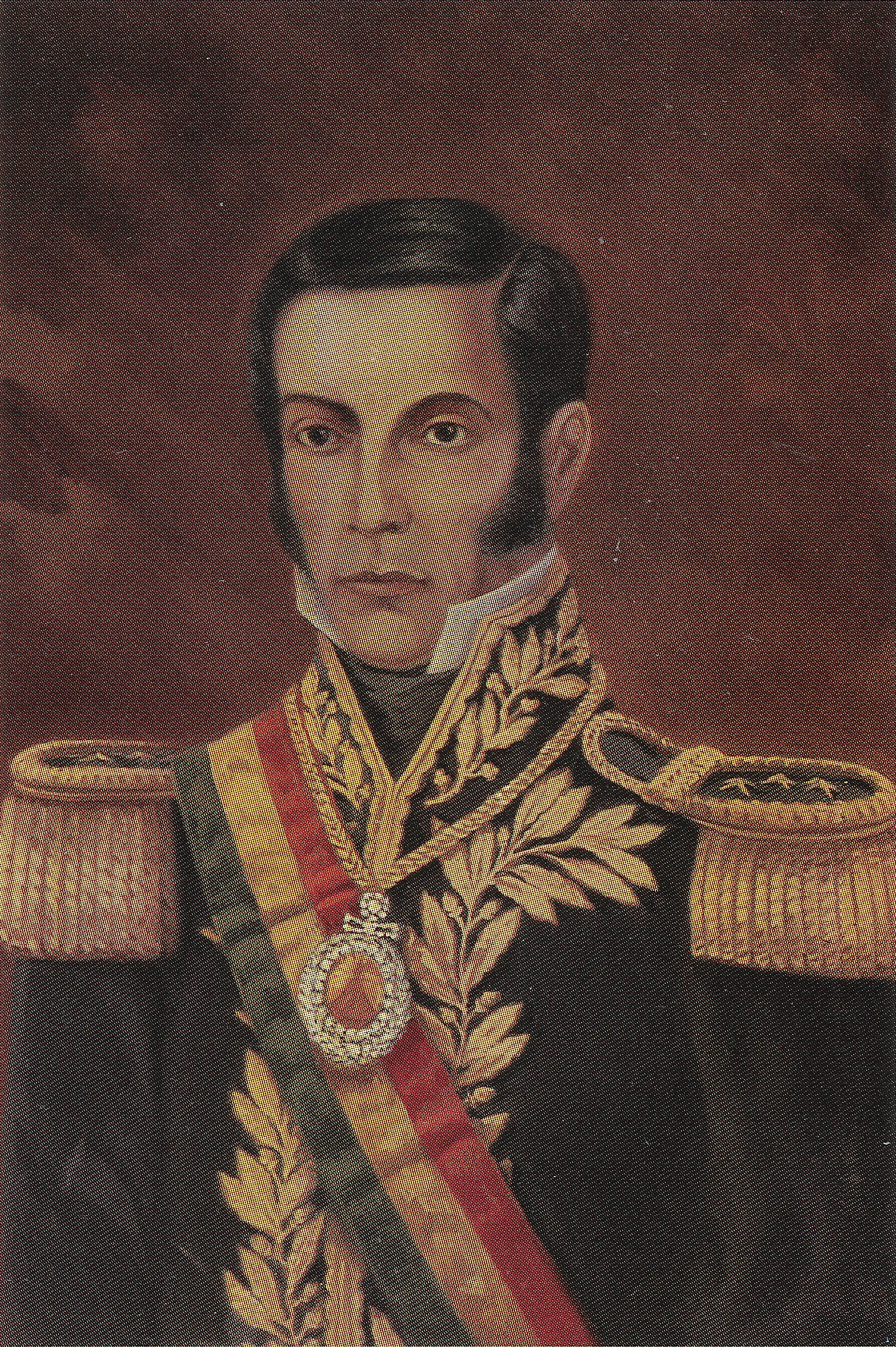
- Date formed: 27 March 1839
- Date dissolved: 10 June 1841 (2 years, 2 months and 2 weeks)

People and organisations
- President: José Miguel de Velasco
- Vice President: Vacant (Note: Office abolished 26 October 1839.)
- No. of ministers: 4
- Total no. of members: 10 (incl. former members)

History
- Predecessor: Cabinet of Andrés de Santa Cruz
- Successor: Cabinet of José Ballivián (Note: The governments of Sebastián Ágreda and Mariano Enrique Calvo, which succeeded Velasco, did not last long enough to constitute ministerial cabinets.)

The Velasco III Cabinet constituted the 10th and 11th cabinets of the Bolivian Republic. It was formed on 27 March 1839, thirty-three days after José Miguel de Velasco was reinstalled as the 4th president of Bolivia following a coup d'état, succeeding the Santa Cruz Cabinet. It was dissolved on 10 June 1841 upon Velasco's overthrow in another coup d'état and was succeeded by the Cabinet of José Ballivián.

== Composition ==
Portfolio	Minister	Party	Prof.	Took office	Left office	Term	Ref.
President	José Miguel de Velasco	Mil.	Mil.	22 February 1839	15 August 1840	839	
President	José Miguel de Velasco	Mil.	Mil.	15 August 1840	10 June 1841	839	
Vice President	Office vacant 22 February – 26 October 1839					246	
Vice President	Office abolished						
Minister General (Note: Exerts command of all ministerial portfolios while the respective ministries are organized.)	Manuel María Urcullu	Ind.	Mag.	22 February 1839	27 March 1839	267	
Minister of the Interior and Foreign Affairs	Manuel María Urcullu	Ind.	Mag.	27 March 1839	16 November 1839	267	
Minister of the Interior and Foreign Affairs	José María Linares	Ind.	Law.	16 November 1839	10 June 1841	572	(Note: President N° 13.)
Minister of War	Manuel Dorado (Note: Acting for José Ballivián who never took office.)	Mil.	Mil.	27 March 1839	14 July 1839	109	
Minister of War	Manuel Eusebio Ruiz	Mil.	Mil.	14 July 1839	26 October 1839	125	
Minister of War and Navy	Manuel Eusebio Ruiz	Mil.	Mil.	26 October 1839	16 November 1839	125	
Minister of War and Navy	Manuel Dorado	Mil.	Mil.	16 November 1839	19 February 1841	461	
Minister of War and Navy	Carlos Medinaceli	Mil.	Mil.	19 February 1841	10 June 1841	111	
Minister of Finance	Miguel María de Aguirre	Ind.	Eco.	27 March 1839	15 June 1839	80	
Minister of Finance	Gregorio Aníbarro	Ind.	Law.	15 June 1839	27 June 1839	12	
Minister of Finance	José María Dalence	Ind.	Mag.	27 June 1839	16 November 1839	142	
Minister of Finance	Miguel María de Aguirre	Ind.	Eco.	16 November 1839	10 June 1841	572	
Minister of Public Instruction	Office vacant 26 October 1839 – 16 November 1839					21	
Minister of Public Instruction	Tomás Frías	Ind.	Law.	16 November 1839	16 November 1840	366	(Note: President N° 17 (twice president).)
Minister of Public Instruction	Manuel Sánchez de Velasco	Ind.	Law.	16 November 1840	10 June 1841	206	

== History ==
Upon his assumption to office, Velasco charged all ministerial portfolios to Manuel María Urcullu, minister of the Supreme Court of Justice, as minister general pending the formation of a proper ministerial cabinet. A full council of ministers was appointed on 27 March 1839, 33 days into his mandate, composed of three ministers. The Political Constitution of 1839 expanded the number of ministerial posts to four with the introduction of the Ministry of Public Instruction. At the same time, the new constitution abolished the office of the vice president, a fact which remained the case until 1878.

Two future presidents, José María Linares (1857–1861) and Tomás Frías (1872–1873; 1874–1876) were members of this cabinet. A third, José Ballivián (1841–1847), was appointed but never took office, having rebelled against the government.

=== Cabinets ===
N°	Date	Decree
I	27 March 1839	Supreme Decree 27-03-1839
II	16 November 1839	Supreme Decree 16-11-1839

=== Structural changes ===
Portfolio	Part of	Transferred to	Date	Decree
Navy	Ministry of War	Ministry of War and Navy	26 October 1839	1839 Political Constitution
Instruction	None	Ministry of Public Instruction	26 October 1839	1839 Political Constitution
