= Cabinet of José Miguel de Velasco =

Cabinet of José Miguel de Velasco is the name of any of four cabinets in the Bolivian Republic led by José Miguel de Velasco:

- Cabinet of José Miguel de Velasco I (1828)
- Cabinet of José Miguel de Velasco II (1829)
- Cabinet of José Miguel de Velasco III (1839–1841)
- Cabinet of José Miguel de Velasco IV (1848)
