= Cabinet of José Miguel de Velasco IV =

1848 Bolivian presidential administration

Fourth Cabinet of José Miguel de Velasco Velasco IV Cabinet
- 16th Cabinet of the Bolivian Republic
- 1848
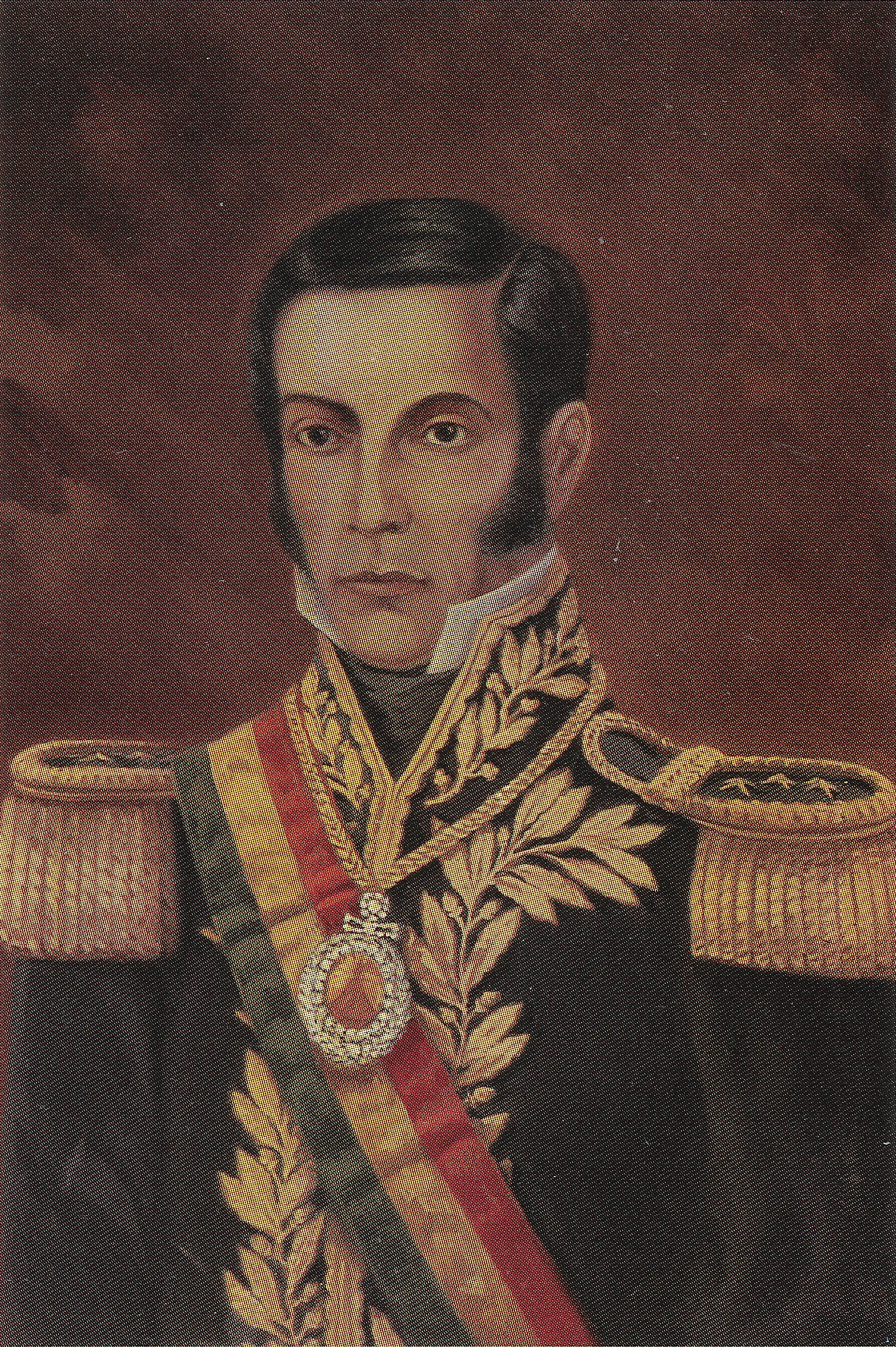
- Date formed: 4 February 1848
- Date dissolved: 16 October 1848 (8 months, 1 week and 5 days)

People and organisations
- President: José Miguel de Velasco
- No. of ministers: 4
- Total no. of members: 5 (incl. former members)

History
- Predecessor: Cabinet of Eusebio Guilarte
- Successor: Cabinet of Manuel Isidoro Belzu

The Velasco IV Cabinet constituted the 16th cabinet of the Bolivian Republic. It was formed on 4 February 1848, 17 days after José Miguel de Velasco was reinstalled) as the 4th president of Bolivia following a coup d'état, succeeding the Guilarte Cabinet. It was dissolved on 16 October 1848 when acting president José María Linares merged all ministerial portfolios into a singular General Secretariat and was succeeded by the Cabinet of Manuel Isidoro Belzu.

== Composition ==
Portfolio	Minister	Party	Prof.	Took office	Left office	Term	Ref.
President	José Miguel de Velasco	Mil.	Mil.	18 January 1848	12 September 1848	323	
President	José Miguel de Velasco	Mil.	Mil.	12 September 1848	6 December 1848	323	
President of the Extraordinary Congress	José María Linares	Ind.	Law.	12 October 1848	6 December 1848	55	(Note: President N° 13.)
Minister General (Note: Exerts command of all ministerial portfolios while the respective ministries are organized.)	Casimiro Olañeta	Ind.	Law.	18 January 1848	4 February 1848	272	
Minister of the Interior and Foreign Affairs	Casimiro Olañeta	Ind.	Law.	4 February 1848	16 October 1848	272	
Minister General	José María Calvimontes	Ind.	Jur.	16 October 1848	6 December 1848	51	
Minister of War	Manuel Isidoro Belzu	Mil.	Mil.	4 February 1848	4 October 1848	243	(Note: President N° 11.)
Minister of War	Felipe Álvarez	Mil.	Mil.	4 October 1848	16 October 1848	12	
Minister of Finance	Andrés María Torrico (Note: Acting for Manuel José de Asín who never took office.)	Ind.	Mag.	4 February 1848	26 March 1848	255	
Minister of Finance	Andrés María Torrico	Ind.	Mag.	26 March 1848	16 October 1848	255	
Minister of Public Instruction and Worship	Andrés María Torrico	Ind.	Mag.	4 February 1848	26 March 1848	51	
Minister of Public Instruction and Worship	Manuel José de Asín	Ind.	Jur.	26 March 1848	16 October 1848	204	

== History ==
Upon his assumption to office, Velasco charged all ministerial portfolios to Casimiro Olañeta as minister general pending the formation of a proper ministerial cabinet. A full council of ministers was appointed on 4 February 1848, 17 days into his mandate, composed of four ministers. In this cabinet, the portfolio of foreign affairs, which in 1842 had been transferred to the Ministry of Public Instruction, was returned to the Ministry of the Interior. In turn, a new post under the name of worship and tasked with religious affairs was attached to the public instruction post.

On 12 October 1848, faced with a rebellion by Manuel Isidoro Belzu, Velasco provisionally transferred command to José María Linares, the president of the Extraordinary Congress. Four days later, Linares appointed José María Calvimontes as minister general tasked with the dispatch of all ministerial administrations for the duration of the crisis. This effectively dissolved Velasco's cabinet on that date.

One future president, Manuel Isidoro Belzu (1848–1855) was a member of this cabinet.

=== Cabinets ===
N°	Formed	Days	Decree
I	4 February 1848	255	Supreme Decree 04-02-1848
