= Ambrosio Peñailillo =

Bolivian military officer (1810–1883)

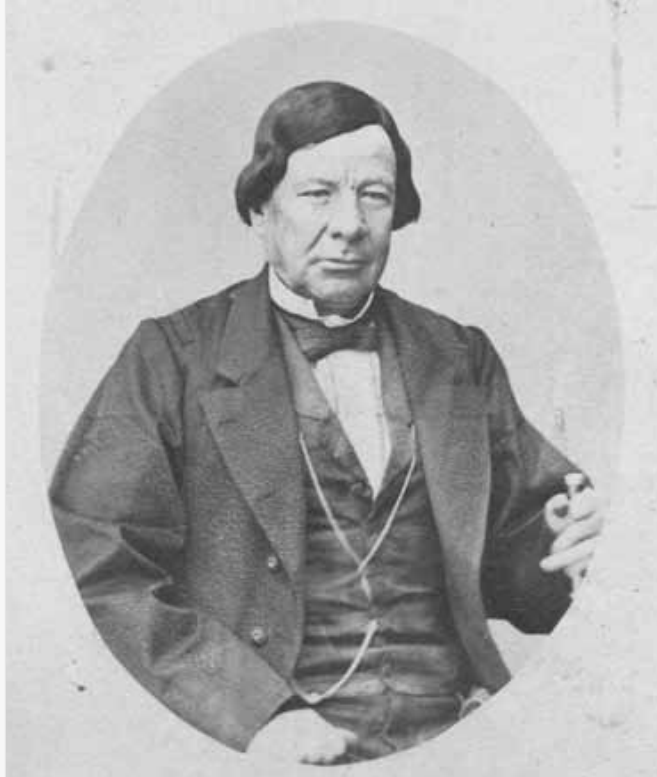

Personal details
- Born: Ambrosio Alfonso Peñailillo Heredia; 11 January 1812 La Paz, Viceroyalty of Peru
- Died: 25 May 1872 La Paz, Bolivia
- Spouse: Petrona Borda Bracamonte

Military service
- Allegiance: Bolivia
- Branch/service: Bolivian Army
- Years of service: 1830–1857
- Rank: Brigadier general

Brigadier General Ambrosio Peñailillo (11 January 1812 – 25 May 1872) was a Bolivian military officer who fought in the War of the Confederation and the Peruvian–Bolivian War of 1841–42. He was present at the Battle of Yungay and the Battle of Ingavi.

== Early life and military career ==
Born in the city of La Paz, Peñailillo was the son of Emilio Eusebio Gayoso Peñailillo and Justa Nieto Navarro. He spent his youth in his family's hacienda in Viacha.

He joined the army in 1828, attaining the rank of second lieutenant in 1830. When General Andrés de Santa Cruz organized his army to consolidate his proposed Peru-Bolivian Confederation, after intervening in Peruvian politics at the request of that republic, Peñailillo was already a second lieutenant and marched as part of the famous fourth battalion, Santa Cruz's favorite unit. In this unit, he built his career as a subordinate, earning laurels that honored his battalion's standard and also experiencing defeat on the fields of Yungay. As captain of one of the companies, a rank obtained shortly before Yungay, he is said to have heroically fought for the cause of the Confederation.

== Return to Bolivia and Peruvian invasion ==
Upon returning to the country, Peñailillo was promoted to sergeant major on 16 January 1840, and assigned as the third in command of the 12th battalion, with which he fought at the Battle of Ingavi on 18 November of the same year. His heroism was rewarded by José Ballivián with an effective promotion to commander. Peñailillo participated in the five-month campaign in Peru, at the end of which he was promoted to graduated lieutenant colonel and assigned as the second in command of the 8th battalion, distinguishing himself for his rectitude and military severity.

== Bolivian politics ==
Effective lieutenant colonel in September 1843 and graduated colonel in 1846, he was another military figure who participated in the political storms that began to intrigue and unsettle the country, undermining the stability of the government and the army from 1843 onwards. Surrounded and solicited by politicians, suffocated by the intrigue-filled atmosphere in which he lived, and influenced by those in power, Peñailillo succumbed to the suggestions of demagogues and supporters of General José Miguel de Velasco, the most popular leader of those years.

As a result, he joined the revolutionaries and became one of the leaders who, along with Manuel Isidoro Belzu, supported the uprising in La Paz, organizing an army of two thousand men which Belzu placed under Velasco's command. Once in the presidency, Velasco awarded him the rank of colonel in February 1848, entrusting him with the command of one of the army corps. Peñailillo, defended Velasco against Belzu, who had risen in arms driven by his ambition for power. He fought valiantly at the Battle of Yamparáez in December 1848, but the revolutionary forces triumphed.

== Final intrigues and retirement ==
Later summoned to the army by President Belzu, Peñailillo was elevated to the rank of brigadier general. It appears that he continued to serve during the time of Jorge Córdova. When Córdova fell in 1857, he withdrew from the ranks of the army and, consequently, from political intrigue.

== Death and legacy ==
Peñailillo died in La Paz on 25 May 1872. He had spent the rest of his life quietly, although highly critical of Hilarión Daza for his failed presidency. Praised by his colleagues Peñailillo was described thus: "The old and meritorious General Ambrosio Peñailillo belongs to that phalanx of heroic military figures who sacrificed themselves to leave us examples of selflessness and patriotism, fighting to preserve Bolivia's independence".
