= Cabinet of Eusebio Guilarte =

Bolivian presidential administration and ministerial cabinet from 1847 to 1848

Cabinet of Eusebio Guilarte Guilarte Cabinet
- 15th Cabinet of the Bolivian Republic
- 1847–1848
- Date formed: 23 December 1847
- Date dissolved: 2 January 1848 (1 week and 3 days)

People and organisations
- President: Eusebio Guilarte
- No. of ministers: 4

History
- Predecessor: Cabinet of José Ballivián
- Successor: Fourth Cabinet of José Miguel de Velasco

The Guilarte Cabinet constituted the 15th cabinet of the Bolivian Republic. It was formed on 23 December 1847 after Eusebio Guilarte was installed as the 10th president of Bolivia following the resignation of José Ballivián, succeeding the Ballivián Cabinet. It was dissolved on 2 January 1848 upon Guilarte's overthrow in a coup d'état and was succeeded by the Fourth Cabinet of José Miguel de Velasco.

== Composition ==
Portfolio	Minister	Party	Prof.	Took office	Left office	Term	Ref.
President	Eusebio Guilrate	Mil.	Mil.	23 December 1847	2 January 1848	10	
Minister of the Interior	Basilio Cuéllar	Ind.	Law.	23 December 1847	2 January 1848	10	
Minister of War	Eusebio Guilrate	Mil.	Mil.	25 November 1847	2 January 1848	38	(Note: President N° 10 (in office).) (Note: Ballivián + Guilarte.)
Minister of Finance	Tomás Frías	Ind.	Law.	23 December 1847	2 January 1848	10	(Note: President N° 17 (twice president).)
Minister of Public Instruction and Foreign Affairs	Domingo Delgadillo	Ind.	Dip.	23 December 1847	2 January 1848	10	

== History ==
Upon his assumption to office in his capacity as president of the Council of State, Guilarte established his ministerial cabinet, the only one of his short, ten day, mandate. It consisted of four ministers including himself as he remained in the post of minister of war, a position he had been holding in the cabinet of José Ballivián.

One future president and one current president, Eusebio Guilarte (1847–1848; in office), and Tomás Frías (1872–1873; 1874–1876) were members of this cabinet.

=== Cabinets ===
N°	Formed	Days	Decree
I	23 December 1847	10	Supreme Decree 23-12-1847
