= José María Pérez de Urdininea =

Bolivian military officer and statesman

3rd President of Bolivia
- Acting
- In office 18 April 1828 – 2 August 1828
- Preceded by: Antonio José de Sucre
- Succeeded by: José Miguel de Velasco (acting)
Other offices
Minister of War
In office 15 August 1855 – 9 September 1857
President	Jorge Córdova
Preceded by	Luciano Alcoreza (as Senior Officer of the Ministry of War)
Succeeded by	Gregorio Pérez
In office 4 October 1843 – 14 October 1843
President	José Ballivián
Preceded by	Manuel Zagárnaga
Succeeded by	José María Silva
In office 27 September 1841 – 16 June 1842
President	José Ballivián
Preceded by	Carlos Medinacelli
Succeeded by	Eusebio Guilarte
In office 9 December 1827 – 2 August 1828
President	Antonio José de Sucre
Preceded by	Francisco Burdett O'Connor
Succeeded by	José Miguel de Velasco
Secretary General
In office 27 September 1841 – 18 October 1841
President	José Ballivián
Preceded by	Office established
Succeeded by	Office dissolved
Governor of San Juan
Acting
In office 19 January 1822 – 10 January 1823
Preceded by	José Antonio Sánchez de Arce
Succeeded by	Salvador María del Carril

Personal details
- Born: José María Pérez de Urdininea; 31 October 1784 near Luribay, Viceroyalty of the Río de la Plata (now Bolivia)
- Died: 4 November 1865 (aged 81) La Paz, Bolivia
- Party: Independent
- Other political affiliations: Affiliated with the Bolivarians
- Spouse: Josefa Terrazas

José María Pérez de Urdininea (31 October 1784 – 4 November 1865) was a Bolivian military officer and statesman who served as the third president of Bolivia in 1828. He was the first Bolivian president to be born in Bolivia itself. He fought with the patriots against the Argentines in Peru. Despite being President for only three months, Pérez held a number of important positions in the Bolivian government including Minister of War between 1841 and 1847.

== Early life ==
=== Youth and the Spanish American Wars of Independence ===
José María Pérez de Urdininea was born in the Anquioma hacienda, near Luribay on 31 October 1784. He studied at the La Paz seminary before later studying in Cochabamba. He joined the Bolivian War of Independence in 1809, fighting in the Battle of Huaqui, after which he was taken wounded to Argentina where he joined the army of Manuel Belgrano and fought in the Battle of Tucumán and the Battle of Salta during the Argentine War of Independence. He fought from 1811 to 1821 under the command of various other Argentine leaders including José Rondeau, Martín Miguel de Güemes, and José de San Martín.

From 1822 to 1823 he was the Governor of San Juan Province, where he formed an army of 500 men under the command of José María Paz to invade Upper Peru. In early 1825, together with Governor of Salta Juan Antonio Álvarez de Arenales, Pérez received the surrender of the last Spanish royalist chief in the territory of Río de la Plata.

== The Bolivian Republic and Presidency ==
=== Acting President ===
Bolivian President Antonio José de Sucre incorporated Pérez into the Bolivian Army, appointing him Minister of War on 9 December 1827 and later President of the Council of Ministers. It was in this capacity that he took command of the government on 18 April 1828 after Sucre was wounded in an army revolt. Accused of not having faced the invasion of Agustín Gamarra, Pérez retired to one of his estates for more than ten years.

=== The War of the Confederation and death ===
In 1838, Marshal Andrés de Santa Cruz, then President of Bolivia and Protector of the Peru–Bolivian Confederation, reincorporated him into the army. He participated in the Battle of Yungay which ultimately resulted in the dissolution of the Peru-Bolivian Confederation. He served again as Minister of War during the governments of José Ballivián in 1843 and Jorge Córdova from 1855 to 1857. He died on 4 November 1865.

== Bibliography ==
- Gisbert, Carlos D. Mesa (2003). Presidentes de Bolivia: entre urnas y fusiles : el poder ejecutivo, los ministros de estado (in Spanish). Editorial Gisbert.

Political offices
Preceded by José Antonio Sánchez de Arce	Governor of San Juan; 1822–1823	Succeeded by Salvador María del Carril
Preceded by Office established	Minister of War; 1827–1828	Succeeded by José Miguel de Velasco
Preceded by Antonio José de Sucre	President of Bolivia; Acting; 1828	Succeeded by José Miguel de Velasco; Acting
Preceded by Office established	Secretary General; 1841	Succeeded by Office dissolved
Preceded by Carlos Medinacelli	Minister of War; 1841–1842	Succeeded by Eusebio Guilarte
Preceded by Manuel Zagárnaga	Minister of War; 1843	Succeeded by José María Silva
Preceded by Luciano Alcoreza as Senior Officer of the Ministry of War	Minister of War; 1855–1857	Succeeded by Gregorio Pérez
