= Mariano Enrique Calvo =

8th President of Bolivia

- Official portrait, Casa de la Libertad, Sucre

8th President of Bolivia
- Acting
- In office 9 July 1841 – 22 September 1841
- Preceded by: Sebastián Ágreda (provisional)
- Succeeded by: José Ballivián (provisional)

3rd Vice President of Bolivia
- In office 23 July 1835 – 22 February 1839
- President: Andrés de Santa Cruz
- Preceded by: José Miguel de Velasco
- Succeeded by: Office abolished Aniceto Arce (1880); Belisario Salinas (1880)

Minister of Interior and Foreign Affairs
- In office 25 January 1833 – 16 August 1835
- President: Andrés de Santa Cruz
- Preceded by: Casimiro Olañeta
- Succeeded by: José Ignacio Sanjinés
- In office 3 July 1829 – 24 January 1832
- President: Andrés de Santa Cruz
- Preceded by: José María de Lara (acting)
- Succeeded by: Casimiro Olañeta

Personal details
- Born: Mariano Enrique Calvo Cuéllar; 17 July 1791 Chuquisaca, Viceroyalty of the Río de la Plata (now Bolivia)
- Died: 29 July 1842 (aged 51) Cochabamba, Bolivia
- Party: Independent
- Other political affiliations: Affiliated with the Crucistas
- Spouse: Manuela Dominga Salinas Anglés
- Parents: Juan de Dios Calvo de la Banda y Antequera; Rosa de Cuéllar y Gómez
- Education: University of Saint Francis Xavier

Military service
- Rank: General

Mariano Enrique Calvo Cuéllar (17 July 1791 – 29 July 1842) was a Bolivian lawyer, general and politician who served as the de facto eighth president of Bolivia briefly in 1841. He also served as the third vice president from 1835 to 1839 during which he also held the powers of acting president while President Andrés de Santa Cruz was in Peru. He would also be given the rank of general and commander of the Bolivian Army by Santa Cruz.

== Early life ==
He was born in Sucre on 17 July 1791 and was baptized on the same date in the Church of San Miguel Arcángel. His godmother was María de Antequera. Scion of a family member of the nobility of Chuquisaca, he came from a long line of oidores of the Real Audiencia de Charcas. Carlos III had declared his father, Juan de Dios Calvo de la Banda y Antequera, a "straight, loyal and faithful minister" of the Crown. His brother was Mariano José Calvo, another prominent lawyer. His mother was Rosa de Cuéllar. He studied law at the Universidad Mayor, Real y Pontificia de San Francisco Xavier Chuquisaca, where he graduated as a lawyer.

== The Creation of the Republic ==
=== Bolivian independence ===
During the War of Independence, he was initially on the royalist side, later joining the ranks of the patriots. In 1818, under the royalist government, he was elected alderman of the Cabildo de La Plata, a designation that was observed by the president of the Royal Court of Charcas, José Pascual de Vivero y Salaverría, because he had held the same position in the revolutionary councils of 1813 and 1815. Once the Republic was established, he stood out as a collaborator of Andrés de Santa Cruz y Calahumana.

=== Services to the Bolivian Nation and State ===
He served "brilliantly" as a minister of the Supreme Court of Justice of Bolivia. He was Minister of the Interior during the Government of the Marshal of Ayacucho Antonio José de Sucre, and Minister of Foreign Affairs during the Government of Marshal of Zepita Andrés de Santa Cruz. He was vice president of the Republic, then president of the Bolivian State during the time of the Peru-Bolivian Confederation between 1836 and 1839. "Lawyer of great reputation" and of "peaceful character and incapable of inspiring suspicion", he was the vice president and held the interim presidency of the country for a longer time (almost two and a half years), replacing the president, when Santa Cruz was in Peruvian territory in the process of forming the protectorate of the Peru-Bolivian Confederation. He presided over the Tapacarí Congress in 1836, which approved the "Restoration" government on June 11 of that year.

==== Awards ====
On June 21, 1836, he was appointed Division General of the Armies of the Republic and Chief of the Bolivian National Guards and decorated with the title of Keeper of the Peace, which he could use in his dictations, he was also decorated with a gold medal trimmed with diamonds, which had on its obverse the emblem of the Republic with the following inscription in the circle: "The Congress of the Bolivian Republic". On the reverse, an outstretched arm, holding in the hand the tree of liberty surrounded by olive branches, with the following inscription in the circle: "To the Conservator of Peace Mariano Enrique Clavo".

=== The codification of law under Santa Cruz ===
The Santa Cruz Penal Code of the South-Peruvian State, promulgated on June 22, 1836, and the Santa Cruz Penal Code of the North-Peruvian State, promulgated on November 15, 1836, although they reproduced the systematics of the Bolivian Penal Code of 1831, incorporated the modifications formulated by Calvo de la Banda in 1834, which exhibited a "marked illustrated tonic".

Considered by his contemporaries, due to the purity of his style, as one of the best prose writers in Bolivia, Calvo de la Banda had referred to the Castilian-Indian legislation that governed before the Santa Cruz codes, when defending the need for this codification — quoted by the Chilean historian Alejandro Guzmán Brito—in these terms:

It is worth remembering the farrago that there is of them, the multiplicity of their codes, the struggle with each other, the repetition of the same provisions, the antilogy that some laws offer in their own wording and even how heavy it is and its unusual language.

== Presidency ==
With Sebastián Ágreda's resignation in 1841, Congress was reassembled. The latter desperately wanted to return to established Constitutional norms, and thus agreed to temporarily turn the reins of state to Calvo, as the last vice-president of Bolivia under Santa Cruz, pending the latter's return. Calvo is thus considered to be the first civilian President of Bolivia. He had difficulty, however, in running the country, with the military divided among pro-Velasco and pro-Santa Cruz camps. In fact, civil war loomed, with part of the country under different military controls, and with a pending Peruvian invasion known to be on its way at the worst of times.

The latter finally materialized (no doubt spurred by the unmistakable appearance of chaos and weakness at the helm in La Paz) in late August 1841. Trusting the fate of the whole country to its military, Calvo could only hope for a miracle. The latter indeed occurred, when General José Ballivián, head of the Bolivian Army, inflicted an astonishing defeat on the invading forces of Peru at the Battle of Ingavi, where the Peruvian President himself, the notorious Agustin Gamarra, was made prisoner and later executed by Ballivián. With the latter the indisputable hero of the moment, Calvo could only acquiesce when Congress named the General Provisional President, once again pending a possible return of Marshall Santa Cruz. Calvo would die only a year later in Cochabamba. He was the first native of the Bolivian capital, La Plata/Chuquisaca (later renamed Sucre) to occupy the Bolivian presidency, and also has the distinction of having been president at the time of the rout of Peruvian forces at Ingavi.

== Family ==
Mariano Enrique Calvo married Manuela Dominga Salinas Anglés in the church of San Miguel Arcángel on 27 July 1814. She was the daughter of Buenaventura Salinas Vaquera and Bernarda Anglés Paniagua. The couple had the following children: José María, Juan de la Cruz, Domingo and Dolores Calvo Salinas.

Political offices
Preceded by José María de Lara; Acting	Foreign Minister of Bolivia; 1829–1831	Succeeded by Casimiro Olañeta
Preceded by Casimiro Olañeta	Foreign Minister of Bolivia; 1833–1835	Succeeded by José Ignacio Sanjinés
Preceded by José Miguel de Velasco	Vice President of Bolivia; 1835–1839	Vacant Title next held by Aniceto Arce; Belisario Salinas
Preceded by Sebastián Ágreda; Provisional	President of Bolivia; Acting; 1841	Succeeded by José Ballivián; Provisional
