= Sebastián Ágreda =

7th President of Bolivia

- Portrait by an unknown author, Casa de la Libertad, Sucre

7th President of Bolivia
- Provisional
- In office 10 June 1841 – 9 July 1841
- Preceded by: José Miguel de Velasco
- Succeeded by: Mariano Enrique Calvo (acting)

Minister of War
- In office 11 May 1863 – 28 December 1864
- President: José María de Achá
- Preceded by: Juan Sánchez
- Succeeded by: Juan Sánchez
- In office 19 September 1862 – 22 December 1862
- President: José María de Achá
- Preceded by: Celedonio Ávila
- Succeeded by: Juan Sánchez

Personal details
- Born: 1795 Potosí, Viceroyalty of the Río de la Plata (now Bolivia)
- Died: 18 December 1875 (aged 79–80) La Paz, Bolivia
- Party: Independent
- Other political affiliations: Affiliated with the Crucistas

Military service
- Branch/service: Bolivian Army
- Rank: General
- Battles/wars: Battle of Ingavi; Battle of Junin; Battle of Ayacucho

Sebastián Ágreda (1795 – 18 December 1875) was a Bolivian military officer and statesman who served as the seventh president of Bolivia for 29 days in 1841. In addition to his short term as president, he also held a number of other governmental roles as well as being a prominent figure in the Bolivian military.

== Early life and military career ==
Ágreda was born in Potosí, Bolivia in 1795, from a very young age, he enlisted in the armies of General José de San Martín. He participated in the battles of Chacabuco and Maipú.

Ágreda had fought in the battles of Junin and Ayacucho under Antonio José de Sucre, for which the Grand Marshal rewarded him as commander of the Military College in Chuquisaca. Later still, he was appointed commander of the Army by Andrés de Santa Cruz, and was considered a national hero for heading the Bolivian forces that routed Argentina at the Battle of Montenegro in 1838.

Later, in the division of General Guillermo Miller, he fought in the battles of Junín and Ayacucho under the command of Antonio José de Sucre. In 1826 he was appointed by Sucre as second head of the Military College until 1828. He fought in the main battles of the campaigns of Marshal Andrés de Santa Cruz in Peru.

He was War Minister of Marshal Santa Cruz. Later he fought in the Battle of Montenegro. For his merits in this battle he was appointed Minister Plenipotentiary in Lima.

== Presidency ==
A loyal supporter of the Grand Marshal, in June 1841 General Ágreda succeeded in removing Gen. José Miguel de Velasco from power, installing himself as de facto ruler pending the return of Santa Cruz. He only controlled portions of the Army and, moreover, faced the opposition of the members of Congress, with whom he had clashed since they insisted on naming one of their own to the post of Provisional President.

After only a month in power, he agreed to leave provided Congress name a pro-Santa Cruz Provisional President until Santa Cruz himself could return to rule. This done, he left the Government Palace, and remained a respected war hero. Indeed, he became an elder statesman of sorts, serving as ambassador abroad and member of the Cabinet under José Ballivián, and Prefect of La Paz and Chuquisaca in his latter years (chiefly in the administrations of Jorge Córdova and José María Achá). He died at the age of 80 in La Paz.

Political offices
Preceded by José Miguel de Velasco	President of Bolivia; Provisional; 1841	Succeeded by Mariano Enrique Calvo; Acting
Preceded by Celedonio Ávila	Minister of War; 1862	Succeeded by Juan Sánchez
Preceded by Juan Sánchez	Minister of War; 1863–1864	Succeeded by Juan Sánchez
