= Eusebio Guilarte =

10th President of Bolivia

- Portrait by Antonio Villavicencio, Museo de Charcas, Sucre

10th President of Bolivia
- Acting
- In office 23 December 1847 – 2 January 1848
- Preceded by: José Ballivián
- Succeeded by: José Miguel de Velasco

Minister of War
- In office 25 November 1847 – 2 January 1848
- President: José Ballivián; Himself
- Preceded by: José María Silva
- Succeeded by: Manuel Isidoro Belzu
- In office 16 June 1842 – 18 November 1842
- President: José Ballivián
- Preceded by: José María Pérez de Urdininea
- Succeeded by: Manuel Zagárnaga

Personal details
- Born: Eusebio Guilarte Mole; 15 October 1805 La Paz, Viceroyalty of the Río de la Plata, Spanish Empire (now in Bolivia)
- Died: 11 June 1849 (aged 43) Cobija, Litoral, Bolivia (now Chile)
- Cause of death: Assassination
- Party: Independent
- Other political affiliations: Affiliated with the Bolivarians; Affiliated with the Ballivinsta; Pro-Ballivianista; Pro-Linaresistas
- Parent(s): Miguel Guilarte; Lorenza Mole

Eusebio Guilarte Mole (15 October 1805 – 11 June 1849) was a Bolivian military officer and statesman who served as the tenth president of Bolivia from 1847 to 1848.

== Biography ==
A career military officer (not an uncommon choice at the time), Guilarte had fought under Andrés de Santa Cruz at Zepita, and also in the battles of the War of the Confederation (Yanacocha and Uchumayo, among others). He had been José Ballivián's deputy aide at the Battle of Ingavi, for which he was rewarded as Ambassador to Brazil.

Later, the President recalled Guilarte and appointed him a member of the powerful Council of State. Unable to sustain himself in power, in light of the vast conspiracies of Manuel Isidoro Belzu, Ballivián chose to leave the country and, in late 1847, turned over power to General Guilarte.

== Presidency and death ==
As head of the Council of State, Guilarte succeeded Ballivián. By then the die was cast, as Belzu and his supporters were closing in on the capital. Guilarte's investiture simply provided cover for the president to get away while he could. Guilarte attempted to reach an understanding with the rebels, but was overthrown by Belzu in less than two weeks.

Allowed to live under house arrest in internal exile at the Pacific port of Cobija, Litoral, Guilarte was assassinated less than two years later after attempting to stage a coup, in 1849. After one of his own officers gave away the plot, Guilarte was executed by orders of the military governor of the region, who was allied to Belzu.

Political offices
Preceded by José María Pérez de Urdininea	Minister of War; 1842	Succeeded by Manuel Zagárnaga
Preceded by José María Silva	Minister of War; 1847	Vacant Title next held by Manuel Isidoro Belzu
Preceded by José Ballivián	President of Bolivia; Acting; 1847–1848	Vacant Title next held by José Miguel de Velasco
