= Jorge Córdova =

12th President of Bolivia

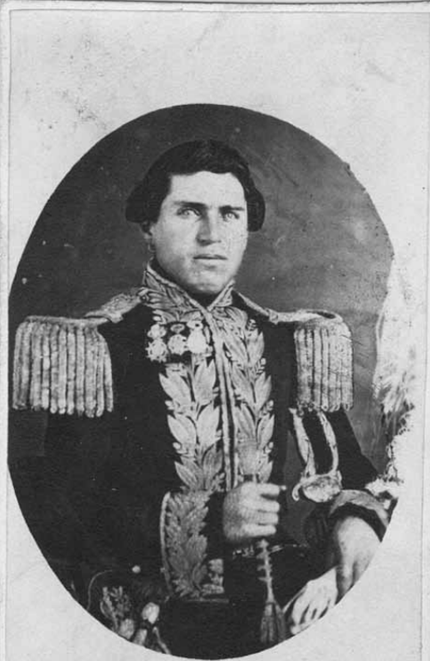
- Jorge Córdova.

12th President of Bolivia
- In office 15 August 1855 – 9 September 1857
- Preceded by: Manuel Isidoro Belzu
- Succeeded by: José María Linares (provisional)

Personal details
- Born: 23 April 1822 La Paz, Viceroyalty of the Río de la Plata (now Bolivia)
- Died: 23 October 1861 (aged 39) La Paz, Bolivia
- Manner of death: Assassination
- Party: Independent
- Other political affiliations: Popular Party (Popular-belcista or Belcista)
- Spouse: Edelmira Belzu Gorriti
- Children: Margarita Córdova Belzu; Francisco Córdova Belzu
- Relatives: Manuel Isidoro Belzu (father-in-law)

Military service
- Allegiance: Bolivia
- Rank: General
- Battles/wars: Battle of Ingavi

Jorge Córdova (23 April 1822, in La Paz – 23 October 1861) was a Bolivian general and politician who served as the 12th president of Bolivia from 1855 to 1857. He was overthrown in 1857 by forces loyal to José María Linares. He was assassinated in 1861.

== Early life ==
=== Childhood ===
Jorge Córdova was born on April 23, 1822, in the city of La Paz, which at that time still belonged to the Viceroyalty of Peru. Of unknown parents, unfortunately Córdova had been born into a family of very humble origin belonging to the lower class of Bolivia, which led to days after his birth, and while he was still a baby, his parents deciding to abandon him, leaving him at the door of a house belonging to the Asín family, which during that time was a distinguished upper-middle class charitable family from the city of La Paz.

Said family from La Paz decided to adopt him and raise him in their home, giving him the name of Jorge and later, when the boy had grown up, he himself decided to take the surname of Córdova voluntarily. He began his primary studies in 1827 at the San Francisco School, which at that time oversaw the Franciscan father José Rivero. While studying at the Franciscan school, Córdova was not a distinguished student because he had never excelled in any subject for any aptitude and according to the Bolivian historian Alcides Arguedas, Córdova also did not have a moral education during his childhood, which later would bring him many problems.

Reaching almost adolescence, Córdova already had a soft and somewhat lazy character but a passionate and sensual temperament. He was expelled from his school for being lazy and undisciplined and then for being a rebellious boy he would also be expelled from the Asín home. During his early years, Córdova was very attracted to a life of laziness and adventure.

=== Military campaigns (1834-1841) ===
Already on the street and looking for a safe haven, Córdova decided to enlist in the Bolivian Army in March 1834 when he was only 12 years old at the time, just as many youngsters did (his own contemporaries) during that time, adopting the arms career. But due to his too young age, which prevented him from being a line soldier and in order not to expel him from the ranks, the officers then decide to send the young Córdova to an army music band where he started as a player of the Triangle (musical instrument).

==== Battle of ingavi ====
In 1841, the Peruvian Army under the command of its president Agustín Gamarra decides to invade Bolivia to annex Bolivian territories. In defense, under the command of the President of Bolivia at the time, Marshal José Ballivián, who decided to unite all Bolivians (who were fighting at the time). The armies met at the Battle of Ingavi and Peru was decisively defeated. Córdova would also participate in this battle and at the end of it he would be promoted to the rank of captain (at 20 years of age) in 1842 for his courage and heroic behavior.

=== Military career ===
A couple of years later, in 1844, already as an army captain, Jorge Córdova married Edelmira Belzú Gorriti (daughter of then Colonel Manuel Isidoro Belzu). From that moment, Córdova would be very attached to his father-in-law both in the family sphere as well as in the political-party sphere. At this point, the prominent Bolivian historian Alcides Arguedas would affirm many years later (in 1929), that both men (Belzú and Córdova) understood each other very well because they had the same origin since both had been born and came from the lower and poor classes. from Bolivia. The young Córdova continued with his military career, rising quickly due to his connection with Belzu. In 1845, he was promoted to the rank of major and in 1848 to the rank of lieutenant colonel. It is worth mentioning that that year his father-in-law reached the Presidency of Bolivia through a coup against President José Miguel de Velasco, Córdova played a crucial role in the Battle of Yamparáez of 1848.

== Presidency ==
=== Election ===
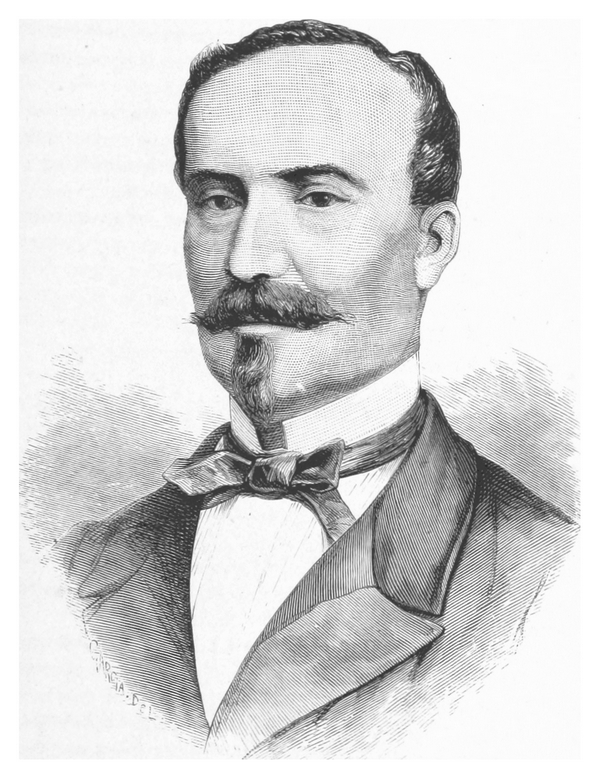
Manuel Isidoro Belzu, his father-in-law and mentor.

When in 1855 Belzu decided to call elections and "retire" from politics in the face of repeated rebellions against his rule, he sponsored Córdova's candidacy. The latter was elected president and proceeded to be sworn in on August 15, 1855, at age thirty-three. Not surprisingly, Córdova was widely seen as ex-president Belzu's proxy, and merely an instrument of his power. Belzu remained the proverbial "power behind the throne," and this fact only spurred the opposition to continue to conspire against the hated Belzu-Córdova regime, which had run Bolivian politics since 1848.

=== Downfall ===
Official portrait by Antonio Villavicencio.

In August 1857, Córdova had moved to the city of Sucre to give his presidential message to the nation in homage to August 6 (day of the country's foundation). Hardly a month had passed when, in September of that year, the tireless political fighter José María Linares reappeared. On September 9, 1857, Linares proclaimed himself in the city of Oruro as the new President of Bolivia, rising up militarily with his followers against the government of President Córdova.

This time, Córdova launched his army (which was in the city of Sucre) and set out on a trip to the city of Oruro with the aim of disrupting the subversive movement of Linares and his followers. President Córdova put himself at the head of his troops, because with this action, Córdova wanted to put an end once and for all to all the military uprisings that had been generated throughout his government and which were promoted by Linares.

When José María Linares found out about Córdova's approach to Oruro, he left the city with his followers on September 17 and headed to Cochabamba, taking with him all the weapons of the military garrisons (barracks) of Oruro.

==== Battle of Cochabamba ====
President Córdova's troops entered the city of Cochabamba and attacked the barricades trying to enter the main plaza on 14 September, but their efforts were useless as they were constantly pushed back by the "Linaristas" and the armed people of the city.

Seeing the failure of his infantry, Córdova decided to send his fearsome cavalry, but they were also rejected and his multiple attempts were in vain. It is worth mentioning that the battle lasted for 3 days.

In the end, very exhausted from fighting, the government troops were defeated and Córdova had to flee Cochabamba, returning again to the city of Oruro with a few troops still loyal to him. In that city, a battalion of his rose up against him and also learned that the cities of La Paz and Sucre had also risen up in favor of José María Linares. Córdova was overthrown and decided to exile himself abroad, escaping to Peru to protect his own life.

== Assassination ==
During the government of President José María de Achá, Cordova returned to Bolivia, thanks to an amnesty, but was the victim of a conspiracy by Colonel Plácido Yáñez, who accused him of allegedly conspiring against the Achá government and had him arrested at his home.

While he was under arrest, Córdova was assassinated on October 23, 1861, on the orders Colonel Yáñez, along with fifty other detainees. These killings were named the Matanzas de Yañez or Matanzas of Loretto. Two days later, the Bolivian government sought to legalize this murder, sentencing the late former president Córdova to death, in a pantomime of a War Council, on charges of high treason.

Political offices
| Preceded by Manuel Isidoro Belzu | President of Bolivia; 1855–1857 | Succeeded by José María Linares; Provisional |
