= Casimiro Olañeta =

Bolivian politician (1795–1860)

José Joaquín Casimiro Olañeta y Güemes (1795–1860) was a nephew of Pedro Antonio Olañeta who, after working for him, turned against his uncle in favor of Bolivian independence. He faced criticism as being two-faced or Machiavellian, in part because the shift occurred in a matter of weeks. He went on to serve as an advisor to Antonio José de Sucre. Casimiro opposed his land being linked in a nation with Argentina.

Olañeta was President of the Bolivian constituent assembly in 1826. He was Minister of Finance of Peru from August 1837 to November 1837. He served as the President of the Chamber of Senators of Bolivia in 1846 as well as a Peruvian representative in Chile.
