= José Miguel de Velasco =

4th President of Bolivia (1795–1859)

Eminent Republican José Miguel de Velasco
- Portrait by Antonio Villavicencio, Museo de Charcas, Sucre

4th President of Bolivia
- In office 18 January 1848 – 6 December 1848 (Note: In dissidence since 2 November 1847.); Provisional: 12 September 1848 – 6 December 1848
- Preceded by: Eusebio Guilarte (acting)
- Succeeded by: Manuel Isidoro Belzu (provisional)
- In office 22 February 1839 – 10 June 1841; Provisional: 22 February 1839 – 15 August 1840
- Vice President: Vacant (1839); None (1839–1841) (Note: Office abolished 26 October 1839.)
- Preceded by: Andrés de Santa Cruz
- Succeeded by: Sebastián Ágreda (provisional)
- In office 1 January 1829 – 24 May 1829; Acting (Note: Acting president from 1–31 January 1829; vice president acting for Andrés de Santa Cruz from 31 January 1829.)
- Preceded by: Pedro Blanco Soto (provisional)
- Succeeded by: Andrés de Santa Cruz (provisional)
- In office 2 August 1828 – 18 December 1828; Acting (Note: Acting president from 2–12 August 1828; vice president acting for Andrés de Santa Cruz from 12 August 1828.)
- Preceded by: José María Pérez de Urdininea (acting)
- Succeeded by: José Ramón de Loayza (acting)

2nd Vice President of Bolivia
- In office 24 May 1829 – 23 July 1835; Provisional: 24 May 1829 – 15 August 1831
- President: Andrés de Santa Cruz
- Preceded by: José Ramón de Loayza (provisional)
- Succeeded by: Mariano Enrique Calvo
Other offices
Minister of War and Navy
In office 24 January 1832 – 3 July 1835
President	Andrés de Santa Cruz
Preceded by	Francisco Burdett O'Connor
Succeeded by	Otto Philipp Braun
Minister of War and Navy
In office 16 May 1831 – 3 July 1831
President	Andrés de Santa Cruz
Preceded by	Mariano Armaza
Succeeded by	Francisco Burdett O'Connor
Minister of War
In office 2 August 1828 – 1 February 1829
President	See list: Antonio José de Sucre; Himself; Pedro Blanco Soto; Himself
Preceded by	José María Pérez de Urdininea
Succeeded by	Anselmo Rivas
1st Prefect of Santa Cruz
In office 1836–1838
Appointed by	Andrés de Santa Cruz
Preceded by	Anselmo Rivas
Succeeded by	José Antonio; Suárez de Argumosa
In office 26 December 1825 – 30 April 1828
Appointed by	Simón Bolívar
Preceded by	Office established
Succeeded by	Antonio Vicente Seoane

Personal details
- Born: José Miguel de Velasco Franco; 29 September 1795 Santa Cruz de la Sierra, Viceroyalty of the Río de la Plata (now Bolivia)
- Died: 13 October 1859 (aged 64) Santa Cruz de la Sierra, Bolivia
- Party: Independent
- Other political affiliations: Affiliated with the Bolivarians; Affiliated with the Velasquistas
- Spouse: Mercedes Ibáñez
- Parent(s): Ramón Gonzales de Velasco; Petrona Franco

Military service
- Allegiance: Bolivia
- Branch/service: Bolivian Army
- Rank: Major general
- Commands: 5th Battalion "Guías" Squadron
- Battles/wars: Salaverry-Santa Cruz War; Battle of Yanacocha; Battle of Socabaya; War of the Confederation; Peruvian-Bolivian War; Battle of Ingavi

José Miguel de Velasco Franco (Spanish pronunciation: [xoˈse miˈɣel de βeˈlasko ˈfɾaŋko]; 29 September 1795 – 13 October 1859) was a Bolivian military officer and statesman who served as the fourth president of Bolivia on four occasions: 1828, 1829, 1839–1841, and 1848. Velasco also served as the second vice president from 1829 to 1835 under Andrés de Santa Cruz, though the first two of his terms were as vice president-designate, pending Santa Cruz's arrival to the country.

Velasco was involved throughout his life in early Bolivian politics and was the protagonist of two of the moments of greatest instability in the country. A key figure in the continuity of the presidential system in which he played the role of acting president twice, he participated in several uprisings and counted figures such as José Ballivián and Manuel Isidoro Belzu as his political rivals. After having overthrown Santa Cruz, the very president he once served under, in 1839, he began his third government (the longest of his four terms), during which he promulgated a new Political Constitution of the State which replaced the one drafted in 1835.

He was overthrown in the 1841 military coup carried out by General Sebastian Agreda, and was subsequently sent to exile in Argentina. He returned to Bolivia in 1847, briefly seizing power to become President in 1848 before he was defeated in the Battle of Yamparaez by forces led by Manuel Isidoro Belzu.

== Early life and career ==
José Miguel de Velasco was born on 29 September 1795 in Santa Cruz de la Sierra, then a city with the Viceroyalty of the Río de la Plata. He was the son of Ramón González de Velasco and Petrona Franco.

A career military officer, he first enlisted in the Spanish royalist army and served under the command of Brigadier José Manuel de Goyeneche. However, he soon came to support the patriotic liberation campaigns of Lower and Upper Peru, fighting as an army major in the armies of José de San Martín and later Antonio José de Sucre. During these campaigns, he participated in the battles of Ayacucho and Junín. By the end of the years-long campaign, he was promoted by Sucre to the rank of general for his military conduct.

=== Prefect of Santa Cruz (1826–1828) ===
Within the newly established State of Upper Peru, he was appointed as the first prefect of Santa Cruz by Simón Bolívar on 11 November 1826, an office he assumed on 28 December. During his term, he proclaimed on 17 January 1827 in Concepción the celebration of 15 February 1825 as the "day of the proclamation of independence from the Spanish government" in Santa Cruz.

Though little is recorded about his administration, it is noted that Velasco undertook the task of converting all those inhabiting the department into citizens of the republic. At the same time, he liberalized trade, establishing trade networks to other sectors of the country.

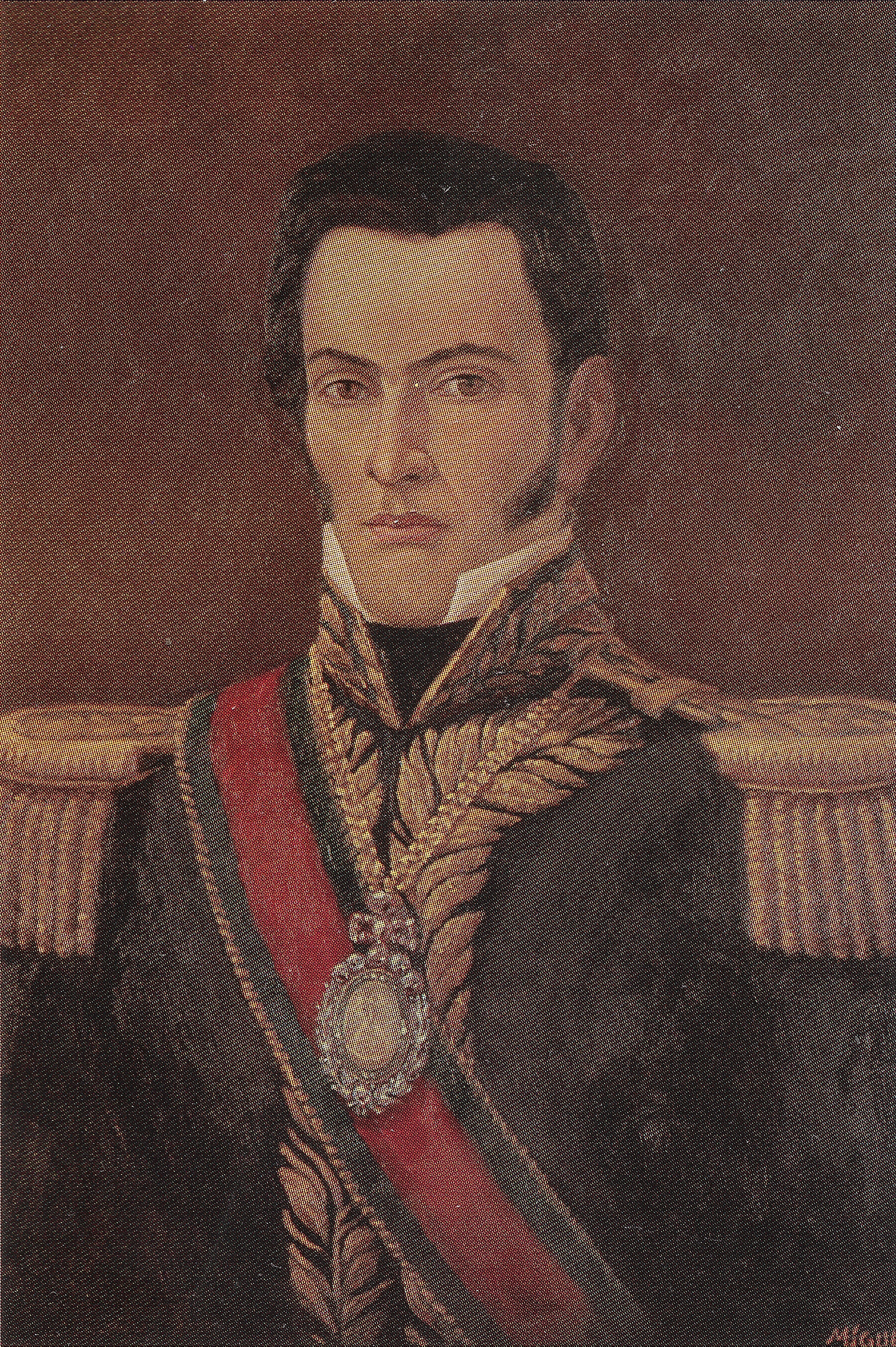
Portrait by Mario Míguez, Palacio Quemado, La Paz

=== Prefect of Chuquisaca (1828) ===
On 18 April 1818, a riot in the city of Chuquisaca left President Sucre wounded and resulted in the death of José Miguel Lanza, the prefect of Chuquisaca, on 30 April. As a result, Velasco was appointed prefect of the Chuquisaca Department for a short time.

== First presidencies (1828; 1829) ==
On 2 August 1828, already incapacitated since 18 April, Sucre presented his definitive resignation to the Constituent Congress. Simultaneously, a new cabinet was appointed by decree, presided by Velasco as minister of war. Ten days later, the Congress elected him to the post of provisional vice president and entrusted him with the command of the country pending the arrival of the president-designate Andrés de Santa Cruz. Velasco's mandate lasted through 18 December when, given the continued absence of Santa Cruz, the Congress reconvened under the framework of a Conventional Assembly dominated by the interests of Agustín Gamarra and the Peruvian Army and elected Pedro Blanco Soto and José Ramón de Loayza as provisional president and vice president.

Upon being sworn in on 26 December, President Blanco opted to maintain Velasco in the war ministry, a decision which proved important as just six days later the president was assassinated. Given the circumstances, the Conventional Assembly once again called on Velasco to exercise the presidency. A month into his mandate, on 31 January 1829, Velasco dissolved the assembly by supreme decree, deeming it to have "exceeded the limits of [its] powers" and declaring the restoration of the regime which preceded it. By extent, Santa Cruz was once again called to take the presidency.

=== Economic policies ===
He focused on stabilizing the country and implementing policies that promoted economic development. Policies were promoted to encourage agriculture, mining, and trade, with the aim of boosting the Bolivian economy. Another important measure was the promotion of industry and agriculture. Policies were implemented to protect domestic production and encourage investment in these areas. Trade treaties were signed and economic integration with neighboring nations was promoted. Regarding the economy, Velasco implemented policies to boost the country's growth and modernization. He encouraged foreign investment and promoted industry and trade. He also worked to improve the country's infrastructure, building roads and promoting river navigation.

== Vice president (1829–1835) and rebellion ==
Velasco handed command of the country to Santa Cruz on 24 May and proceeded to be sworn in himself as vice president. For most of his vice presidency, he served simultaneously as minister of war and navy. Two years later on 15 July 1831, the Constituent General Congress convened in La Paz to formally recognize the pair in their positions. At the same time, Velasco was granted the rank of major general while Santa Cruz was elevated to captain general. They took the oath of office the following day. His vice-presidential term came to an end on 23 July 1835 when Mariano Enrique Calvo was elected to succeed him. In recognition of his service, the Senate conferred upon him the honorific title of Eminent Republican.

After briefly serving once again as prefect of Santa Cruz from 1836 to 1838, at the behest of Santa Cruz, Velasco participated in the War of the Confederation as chief of staff of the armed forces. However, he eventually grew weary of Santa Cruz's ambitions, viewing him as having put Bolivia in the background in his quest to unify the state with Peru. Following the defeat suffered by Santa Cruz in Yungay in January 1839, Velasco, at the command of a division formed from the 5th Battalion and the "Guías" Squadron, rose up in Tupiza and declared the secession of the Bolivian Republic from the Peru-Bolivian Confederation on 9 February. In the ensuing days, several pronouncements in support of the rebellion occurred, until on 17 February the government chaired by Vice President Calvo, who was in Cochabamba while Santa Cruz was absent in Arequipa, was deposed. After five days of misrule and uncertainty, Velasco was sworn in as the "provisional supreme head" of the republic in Potosí on 22 February.

== Third presidency (1839–1841) ==
Soon into his mandate, Velasco convened in Chuquisaca (Note: Renamed Sucre on 12 July 1839.) a General Constituent Congress which on 16 June formally recognized him as provisional president. During this time, the Congress underwent the process of drafting a new constitution, promulgated on 26 October 1839. The constitution, the fourth in the history of Bolivia, was the country's most liberal yet. Prominent features included the abolition of capital punishment for political crimes, the erection of special courts and municipalities, and the right to petition. A notable omission was the office of vice president which was abolished, with constitutional succession corresponding to the president of the Senate. While future constitutions further reworked the presidential line of succession, the vice presidency did not return until 1878, 39 years later.

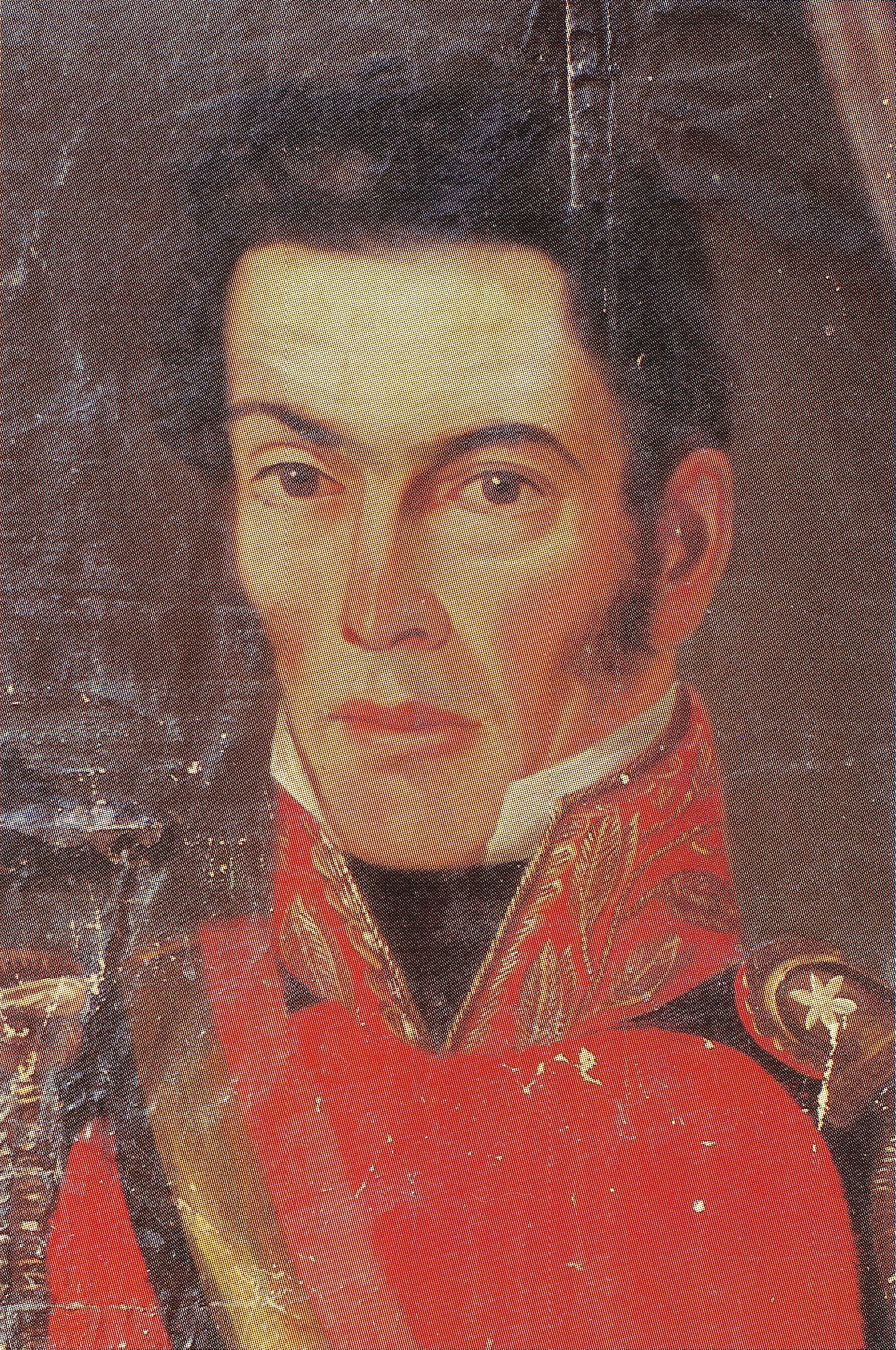
Portrait by Miguel Brum Ocampo, 1878

Velasco's tenure was marked by external and internal threats to the country. On its western frontier, military confrontation with the government of Peru, headed by President Gamarra, remained a looming threat towards the continued independence of Bolivia. Meanwhile, supporters of both the exiled Santa Cruz and General José Ballivián conspired to overthrow Velasco's government. In July 1839, Ballivián and the "Legión" battalion rebelled against the government, forcing Velasco to hand presidential command to the president of Congress, José Mariano Serrano, while he personally headed the army's response. The uprising ultimately resulted in failure, though Velasco commuted the death sentence of the rebellious 5th battalion and declared general amnesty to those involved in the Ballivián rebellion.

=== 1841 coup d'état ===
Political conspiracies continued to transpire however, and on 10 June 1841, supporters of Santa Cruz revolted in Cochabamba and succeeded in imprisoning and exiling the president to Argentina. The military government chaired by Colonel Sebastián Ágreda immediately called for the return of Santa Cruz from exile and handed command of the state to former vice president Calvo pending his return. Soon after, Ballivián returned to Bolivian territory from Peru and rose up in opposition to Santa Cruz's return. Meanwhile, Velasco, who had taken refuge in northern Argentina, reorganized his army into a fighting force of 1200 cavalry and rose up Tupiza, gaining the support of the capital in Sucre.

The situation turned the territory into a national battlefield as the differing presidential candidates vied for control of the state. The chaotic situation presented either an absence of any government or a situation of three separate simultaneous commands: Velasco's constitutional one in Sucre, the restorationist one in Cochabamba, and that of Ballivián in La Paz. In this context, it is important to note the imminence of a Peruvian invasion of the country under the command of Gamarra. Finally on 22 September, Ballivián overthrew the government chaired by Calvo and, after five days of uncertainty, he was sworn in on the 27th.

== Battle of Ingavi ==
On 1 October, four days after Ballivián's victory, Peruvian forces began to march on Bolivian territory. At this point, Ballivián had not yet managed to consolidate control over the country and the civil war offered Gamarra the opportunity to annex the country. However, in a display of patriotic unity, Velasco opted to lay down his political aspirations and end his revolutionary movement and ceded control of his troops to Ballivián, who, with their help, obtained a resounding victory in the Battle of Ingavi on 18 November which resulted in the decisive defeat of the Peruvian army and the death of Gamarra. After the victory at Ingavi, Velasco went into voluntary exile in Argentina, taking residence in Yavi.

== Fourth presidency (1848) ==
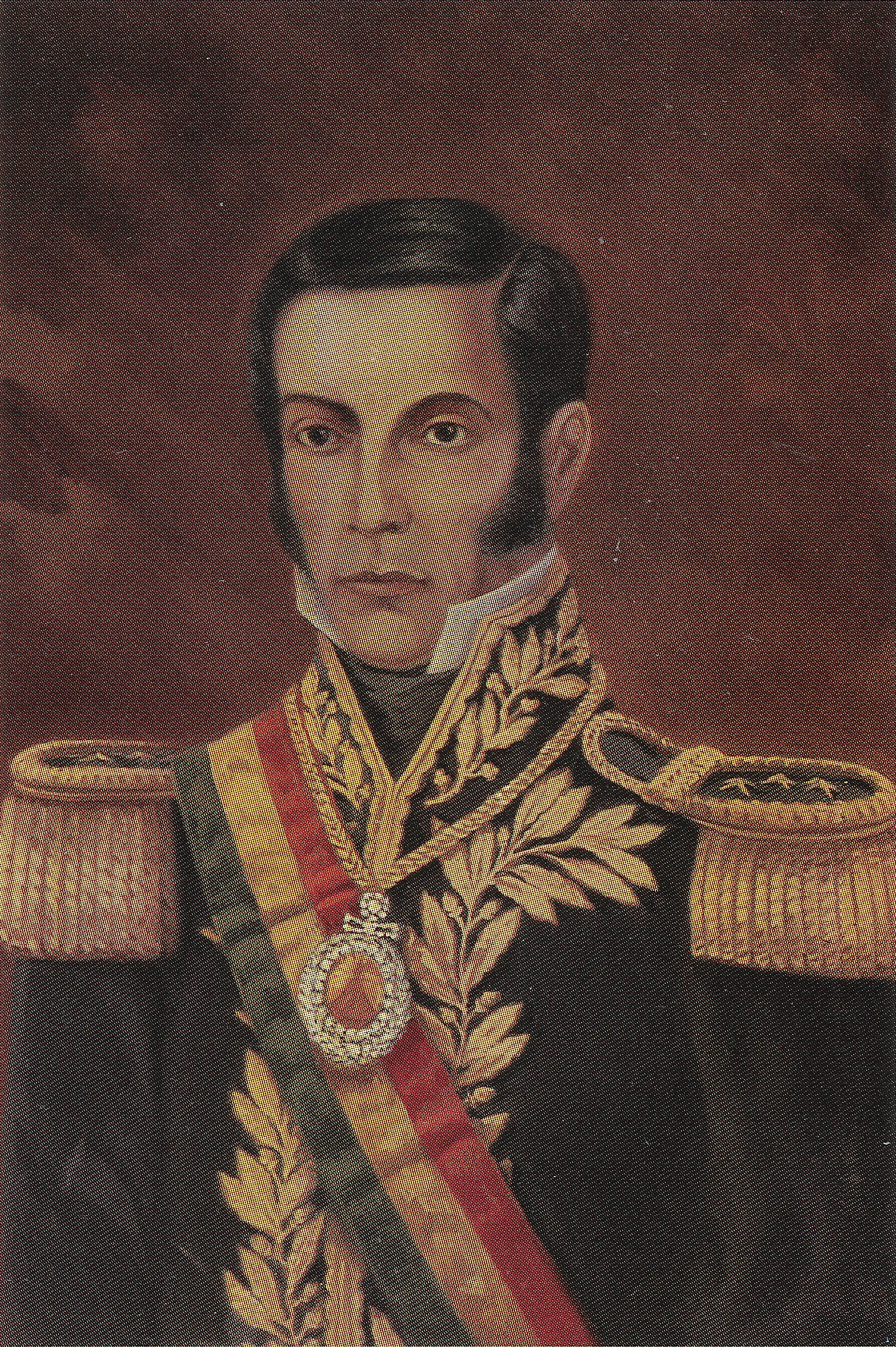
Contemporary portrait by an unknown author, c. 1848

Between late 1847 and early 1848, Velasco was once again one of the protagonists of another period of major instability in the country. In October 1847, Prefect of Santa Cruz Manuel Rodríguez Magariños was deposed by General Francisco Bartolomé Ibáñez who from Santa Cruz de la Sierra declared Velasco president. Throughout the month, subsequent declarations calling for the return of Velasco occurred in Cinti, Potosí, Sucre, Tarija, Chichas, and Mizque. By the end of the month, a revolution with the adherence of 3000 men had begun but was quickly crushed by Ballivián due to the strategic mistakes of its leaders. Nonetheless, popular support for the ex-president continued across the country.

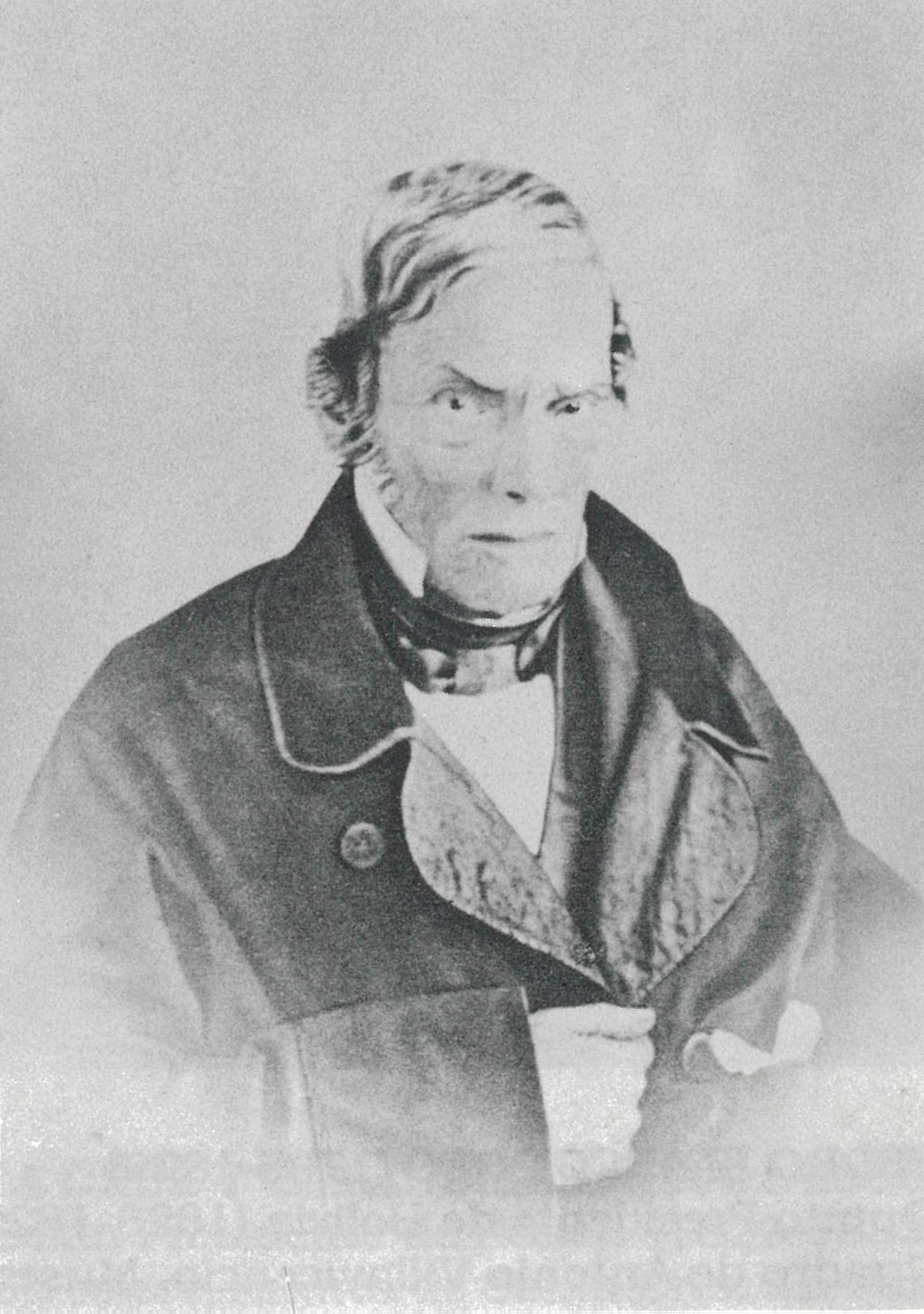
Daguerreotype portrait of an elderly Velasco, c. 1850

On 27 November, Velasco in the town of Mojo was proclaimed "legal president of Bolivia". By 17 December, the 10th Battalion had risen up in La Paz, forming an army of over 2000 men with Colonel Manuel Isidoro Belzu at the helm. With the situation having spiralled out of control and seeing the writing on the wall, President Ballivián preemptively submitted his definitive resignation on 23 December in order to avoid his violent overthrow. In the following days, the entire army proclaimed support for Velasco. After ten days in office, the government chaired by Ballivián's successor Eusebio Guilarte was overthrown. A period of sixteen days passed with uncertainty until 18 January when Velasco took the oath of office in Moraya.

The new government operated by decree until August when the Extraordinary Congress convened under the 1839 Constitution, electing Velasco provisional president on 12 September. Velasco's government did not prove long-lasting as the political ambitions of Belzu, his own minister of war, led him to rise up in rebellion in Oruro. On 12 October, Belzu was proclaimed president by his supporters and Velasco was forced to entrust executive command to the president of the Extraordinary Congress, José María Linares, while he garrisoned his forces in Potosí. Velasco and Belzu spent several months fighting in small skirmishes with alternating victories until 6 December when the president was finally defeated at Yamparaez.

After Yamparaez, an attempted counter-coup was undertaken to return Velasco to his presidential post. While Velasco's forces managed to seize Tarija, they were defeated in Potosí and Cochabamba. With that, Velasco fell from power for the final time and he retired again to exile in Argentina. In 1854, he and Linares made a final attempt at the presidency but were defeated at Mojo and fled once again across the southern border.

== Later life and death ==
On 11 September 1855, the government of Belzu's successor and son-in-law Jorge Córdova allowed Velasco to return to the country, funding his return travels and granting him a government pension to live off of. He died in Santa Cruz de la Sierra on 13 October 1859. He was the first president to wear the historic presidential medal as a symbol of the presidency and was the first Cruceño to hold the presidency.

Political offices
Preceded by Office established	Prefect of Santa Cruz; 1826–1828	Succeeded by Antonio Vicente Seoane
Preceded by José María Pérez de Urdininea; Acting	President of Bolivia; Acting; 1828	Succeeded by José Ramón de Loayza; Acting
Preceded by José María Pérez de Urdininea; Acting	Minister of War; 1828–1829	Succeeded by Anselmo Rivas
Preceded by Pedro Blanco Soto; Provisional	President of Bolivia; Acting; 1829	Succeeded by Andrés de Santa Cruz; Provisional
Vacant	Vice President of Bolivia; 1829–1835	Succeeded by Mariano Enrique Calvo
Preceded by Mariano Armaza	Minister of War and Navy; 1831–1835	Succeeded by Otto Philipp Braun
Preceded by Anselmo Rivas	Prefect of Santa Cruz; 1836–1838	Succeeded by José Antonio Suárez de Argumosa
Preceded by Andrés de Santa Cruz	President of Bolivia; 1839–1841	Succeeded by Sebastián Ágreda; Provisional
Preceded by Eusebio Guilarte; Acting	President of Bolivia; 1848	Succeeded by Manuel Isidoro Belzu; Provisional
