= José Ballivián =

9th President of Bolivia

- Portrait by Antonio Villavicencio, Museo de Charcas, Sucre

9th President of Bolivia
- In office 27 September 1841 – 23 December 1847; Provisional: 27 September 1841 – 15 August 1844
- Preceded by: Mariano Enrique Calvo (acting)
- Succeeded by: Eusebio Guilarte (acting)

Minister of War
- In office 27 March 1839 – 13 July 1839
- President: José Miguel de Velasco
- Preceded by: Otto Philipp Braun
- Succeeded by: Manuel Eusebio Ruiz

Personal details
- Born: 5 May 1805 La Paz, Viceroyalty of the Río de la Plata (now Bolivia)
- Died: 6 October 1852 (aged 47) Rio de Janeiro, Empire of Brazil
- Resting place: Crypt of the San Francisco Museum, La Paz, Bolivia
- Spouse: Mercedes Coll
- Children: 7 (including Adolfo Ballivián)
- Parent(s): Jorge Ballivián; Isidora Segurola

José Ballivián Segurola (5 May 1805 – 6 October 1852) was a Bolivian general during the Peruvian-Bolivian War. He also served as the ninth president of Bolivia from 1841 to 1847. He advocated during his reign for free-trade economic policies. He also advocated for liberalism.

== Early life ==
Born in La Paz to wealthy parents, he was the nephew of Dámaso Bilbao la Vieja. Ballivián had a rather undistinguished military career until his elevation to the post of Commander of the Army in June 1841. He had been a royalist until 1822, but switched sides and joined Lanza's insurrectionist army at the age of 18. His advance in the Bolivian army was unremarkable, although his role was apparently fundamental to the Confederate triumph over Salaverry at the Battle of Socabaya in early 1836. He had been a supporter of Santa Cruz in the 1830s.

== The Battle of Ingavi ==
At age 37 and as Bolivian Army chief, Ballivián united the pro-Velasco and pro-Santa Cruz factions under his command to face-off a massive Peruvian invasion led by President Agustín Gamarra. At the Battle of Ingavi (November 1841), Ballivián achieved a decisive victory against Gamarra, whom he took prisoner and ordered executed.

The victory at Ingavi is regarded by some historians as the high point of Bolivian military history. Ingavi preserved Bolivian independence and made Ballivián a popular figure in a politically fractured nation. Congress almost immediately proclaimed him Provisional President, replacing Calvo. Marshall Santa Cruz, from France, acquiesced to his rule and declined to return in the face of the enormous popularity of the new Caudillo.

== President of Bolivia ==
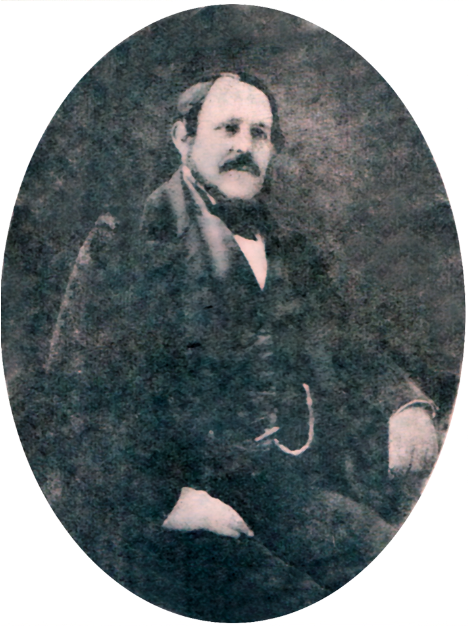
Daguerreotype of Ballivián.

Elected at the ballot box in 1842, Ballivián was a capable leader who enacted important reforms, including a revision of the Constitution. However, to stave any revolutionary plots by the rebellious Colonel Belzu and José Miguel de Velasco, Ballivián appointed military officers that supported him, like Dámaso Bilbao la Vieja and Eusebio Guilarte, in positions of power. He also encouraged the return of exiled military officers, such as Gregorio Fernández who was made Prefect of La Paz in 1843. Generally, he followed the organizational and administrative style of Santa Cruz and took great care to keep his supporters happy, thus positioning himself as the Grand Marshal's heir. It was Ballivián who ordered the first serious attempt at exploring and mapping the vastly unknown interior of the country and its frontiers.

He also created the Department of Beni, and endeavored to establish Bolivian control over the sea-fronting Department of Litoral. Under his administration, the guano riches of that frontier region were exploited for the first time in earnest. However, he failed to create a credible deterrent military presence in the area, since he tended to concentrate loyal troops in the important centers of population in order to quell rebellions, especially after 1845.

=== Downfall and death ===
Ballivián had the misfortune of experiencing the defection, and subsequent dogged personal opposition, of the charismatic General Manuel Isidoro Belzu, once head of the Army but now wounded by the alleged or perceived pursuit of his wife by the President. Belzu withdrew to the countryside with his followers in 1845 and, swearing revenge, all but declared war on Ballivián, igniting a massive confrontation that polarized Bolivian society. Little by little, the populist Belzu's legend grew, while Ballivián's became more tarnished, especially when the latter was forced to resort to increasingly authoritarian measures to keep control.

Eventually, civil war-like conditions erupted, forcing the embattled Hero of Ingavi to flee shortly before Christmas of 1847. He left in his place General Eusebio Guilarte, head of the Council of State and second in line to the presidency in accordance to the new Constitution Ballivián himself had promulgated.

Following his exile in Chile, he moved to Rio de Janeiro, Brazil, where he remained the rest of his days. He suddenly died in 1852 in Rio de Janeiro, but is revered to this day as one of Bolivia's greatest Presidents and foremost military leaders. His remains were repatriated and he was given a lavish state funeral. José Ballivián's son, Adolfo Ballivián, followed in his father's footsteps and became Constitutional President of Bolivia in 1873.

Political offices
Preceded by Otto Philipp Braun	Minister of War; 1839	Succeeded by Manuel Eusebio Ruiz
Preceded by Mariano Enrique; Calvo; Acting	President of Bolivia; 1841–1847	Succeeded by Eusebio Guilarte; Acting
