= Quintín Quevedo =

Bolivian military officer

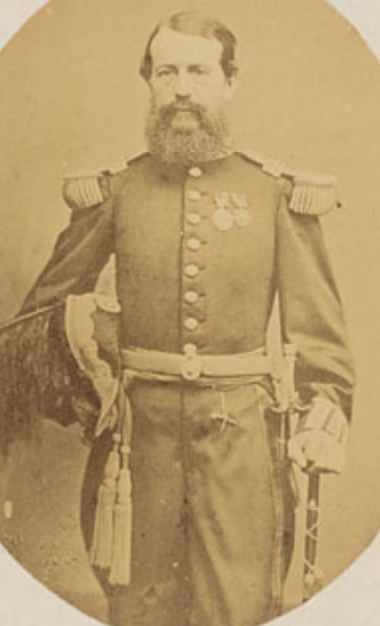

Member of the Chamber of Deputies Representing Mizque
- In office 31 May 1855 – 18 May 1856
- Preceded by: Juan de Dios La Lastra
- Succeeded by: Carlos Manuel Ruiloba

Member of the Chamber of Deputies Representing Cochabamba
- In office 14 May 1873 – 29 June 1874
- Preceded by: Diego de la Tapia Terrazas
- Succeeded by: Pedro Augusto Antezana

Personal details
- Born: October 31, 1825 Caminiaga, Córdoba, Argentina
- Died: August 24, 1876 Puno, Peru
- Party: Independent
- Other political affiliations: Affiliated with the Melgarejists
- Spouse: Modesta Carrasco
- Children: 3
- Parent(s): Rafael Quevedo Laira; Carmen Ferrari García
- Education: Instituto Nacional General José Miguel Carrera
- Occupation: Military officer

Military service
- Allegiance: Bolivia
- Branch/service: Bolivian Army
- Rank: Brigadier general

Quintín Quevedo Ferrari (31 October 1825 – 24 August 1876) was a Bolivian military officer who rose to prominence after aiding Mariano Melgarejo in the overthrow of President José María de Achá in 1864. He was also a famous and early explorer of the Bolivian Amazon, exploring the Madeira River and the Beni savannah frontier. In 1872 he launched an invasion from Valparaíso, Chile, resulting in an international crisis which is believed to have led to a secret alliance treaty between Peru and Bolivia against Chile. Said alliance became effective with the Chilean occupation of Antofagasta and the Bolivian Litoral Department, leading to the War of the Pacific.

After the overthrow of Melgarejo, Quevedo would relentlessly conspire against the governments of Agustín Morales, Adolfo Ballivián, and Tomás Frías. He was only finally defeated when the elderly Frías himself led his pacifying army to victory at the Battle of Chacoma, where Quevedo was soundly defeated. However, much like Quevedo's earlier expedition to Cobija, his rebellion in 1875 greatly affected Bolivian politics, as only a few months later revolts broke out throughout the country, even resulting in the burning of the Government Palace that same year. The fractured and weak state of the country and its government allowed for Hilarión Daza's coup in 1876 to easily succeed. Without a doubt, Quevedo played a crucial role in Bolivian history, affecting so much of the nation's destiny in a period of only four years.

== Early life ==
Quevedo was born in the town of Caminiaga, near the city of Córdoba, Argentina, on October 31, 1825, the son of Rafael Quevedo and Carmen Ferrari. His father had supported the patriot cause in Upper Peru during the Spanish American wars of independence, leading to his exile to the Argentine Republic. With the independence of the Bolivia achieved, his family returned to Bolivia, and in 1836 he was sent to Chile to study at the Instituto Nacional General José Miguel Carrera. Quevedo returned to Bolivia in 1841, the same year the Battle of Ingavi took place. He wrote a poem about the battle called the Canto a Ingavi. Many praised this work and when José Ballivián was touring the major cities of Bolivia, he invited Quevedo to join the garrison of the city as a second lieutenant.

== Military career ==
Quevedo would accept and chose to join as an artillery officer. He was commissioned with opening an academy specialized in training artillery units in Viacha. This was, however, ended by the sudden rebellion of Fructuoso Peña in 1843. Nonetheless, Quevedo continued rising rapidly through the ranks. By 1844, Quevedo had risen to the rank of captain. In 1846, he married Modesta Carrasco, the only child of General Manuel Carrasco.

In 1847, President Ballivián faced rebellion throughout the country. One of his main detractors was General José Miguel de Velasco, whose cause Quevedo would join. The Santo Domingo rebellion of Cochabamba, in which he played a role, declared itself against Ballivián and in support of Velasco. Seeing his support waning, Ballivián decided to resign. Velasco would reward Quevedo with the rank of lieutenant colonel and allowed him to create El Independiente, a newspaper based in Cochabamba. It was in this newspaper that Quevedo published many of his poetic works, which proved to be successful and popular. In 1848, he was made Consul to Peru in Tacna. Later that year, however, Manuel Isidoro Belzu ousted Velasco after the bloody Battle of Yamparaez, on December 6 of that year. Although Belzu offered him to keep his position as Consul, Quevedo declined and remained exiled in Tacna.

== Political career ==
=== Commutation of the death sentence of Mariano Melgarejo ===
During his exile, Quevedo founded a trading company and would support the Legalista Party of José María Linares. However, in 1850, he stopped his support after a failed attempt to oust Belzu headed by Linares and Ballivián. On September 6, 1850, the legalistas launched an insurrection after an attempt on the life of President Belzu had been made. To the plotter's dismay, not only had their rebellion been crushed by the military, but Belzu still lived. In 1852, Quevedo returned to Bolivia under the pretext of his mercantile business. At the time of his return, Mariano Melgarejo, then a colonel, was under arrest and had been sentenced to death for treason. Quevedo put his several connections to use in hopes of saving the life of Melgarejo. The cause was successful and, in 1854, Melgarejo was spared by Belzu.

A jubilant Melgarejo wrote to those that had pleaded for his life, including Quevedo, a pamphlet dated February 14, 1854, stating the following:

In gratitude to: Pedro Reyes Dorado, Marcos Rojas, José Gregorio Salamanca, Quintín Quevedo, and Lucas Merubia.

Generous emissaries of the noblest of peoples, I have not forgotten you! Today our people enthusiastically greet your virtue, and I have wanted to join them to speak to you now, especially. Your glory is greater than that of those people who represent the masses only for their political interests, you have represented them in their desires for humanity. Glory to you who have been chosen for such a holy task. You have saved my life, and from today there is an indissoluble bond between you and me; You have removed the chains that already bound me to death. May God give me an opportunity to show you that my gratitude is a chain to my heart that will never be broken. I cannot emphasize this more: your name, at the top of this paper, and mine, at the bottom, means more than my lips can express.

Mariano Melgarejo.

=== The presidencies of Córdova and Linares ===
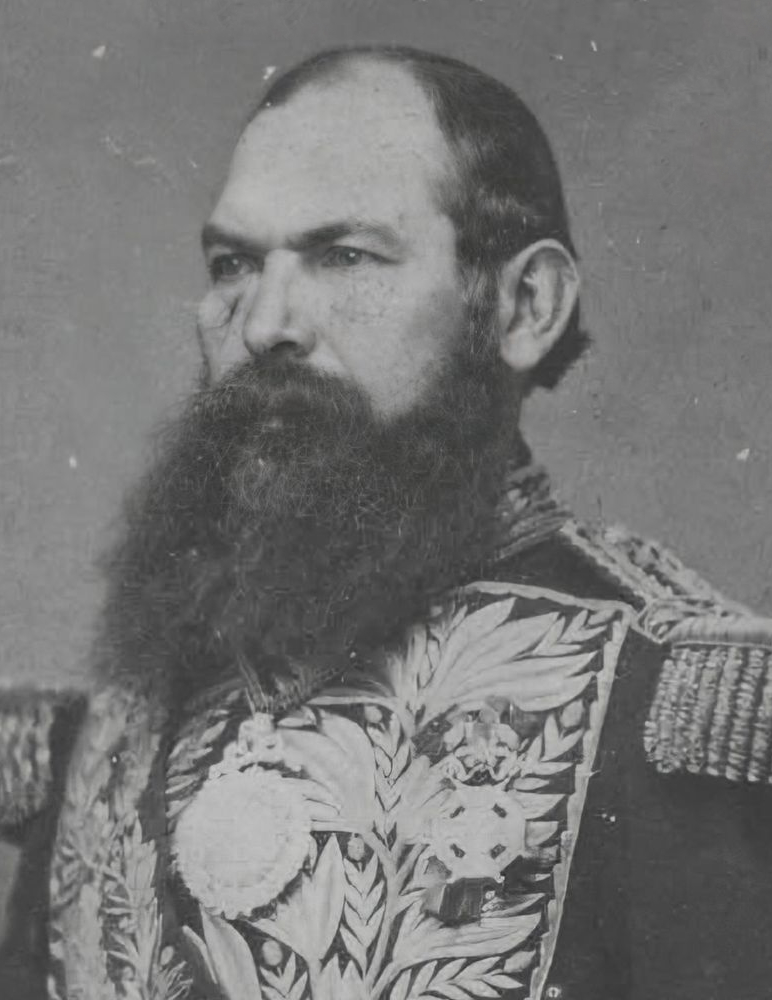
General Mariano Melgarejo.

Quevedo supported his friend, Jorge Córdova, in the elections of 1855. Córdova would defeat the legalistas and Linares, ensuring that the army remained loyal to the government. For the first time in Bolivian history, the transition of power had been concluded by the Congress in Sucre. Quevedo was sworn into the Chamber of Deputies, representing the province of Mizque. In 1855, Córdova would pardon any political fugitives and exiles through supreme decree.

In September 1857, Linares would revolt against the government and incite the rebellion of the city of Cochabamba. Although Córdova would siege the city, he was eventually forced to withdraw to Oruro. Quevedo had declared himself in support of the government, which earned him the rank of colonel. It was during the retreat to Oruro that Quevedo was given 10,000 pesos and tasked with the purchase of military equipment in Tacna. However, Linares triumphed and Quevedo gave the purchased equipment to the new government, opting to withdraw to private life and continuing his mercantile enterprise.

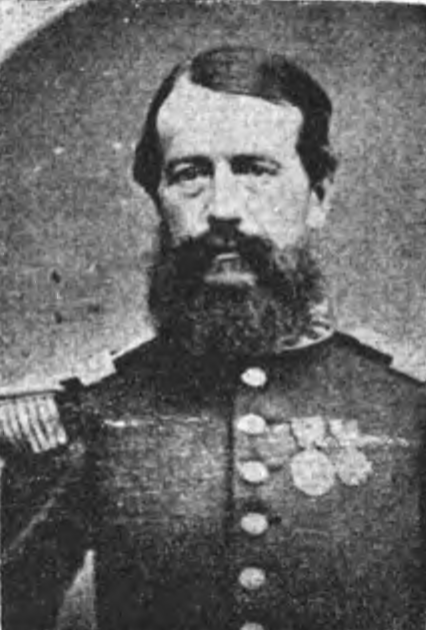
Quevedo as a Colonel.

Although Linares had promoted himself as a constitutionalist, he would establish himself as Dictator and persecute those who had opposed him in the past. Instead of representing the pacifist and democratic ideals which he professed in past years, he was as, if not more, oppressive than Belzu. He became relentless and almost neurotic, riding from city to city and town to town in order to crush the many rebellions he faced. The dictatorial decree of March 31, 1858, placed the life and rights of the citizen at the mercy of the government, suppressing the ordinary jurisdiction for political crimes, removing the freedom of the press, and imposing severe penalties on those who expressed their opinion on the government.

==== Internal exile in the Beni savannah ====
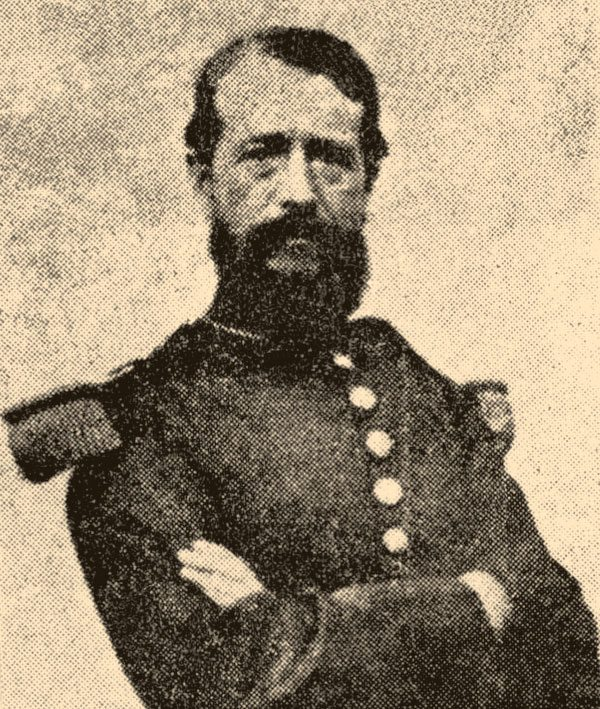
General Quevedo in 1870.

Quevedo soon joined the many plots which began to abound against the Dictator Linares, especially after Belzu's return to Bolivia in 1860. The goal was to reinstate Córdova as president and have Belzu as Commander in Chief of the Army. Quevedo launched an invasion from Peruvian territory and was supposed to be joined along the way by other rebellious battalions. Linares, however, had been informed by his secret police of the invasion and was able to crush the insurrection in Sucre and then have Quevedo captured in the fields of Yaro. A military jury condemned him to death on October 31 of that year. Many pleaded for the colonel's life, resulting in his internal exile to the border with Brazil and the commutation of his death sentence.

Quevedo would spend his time in exile in the distant oriental Department of Beni, exploring uncharted lands. He is said to have discovered incredibly beautiful and astonishing waterfalls as well as potential routes for commerce. Travelling down the Madeira River, he wrote poems and reports on everything he witnessed during his explorations. He remained in exile until José María de Achá overthrew the government in 1861, whereupon Quevedo was allowed to return.

=== The Presidencies of Achá Melgarejo ===
A triumvirate was established in the wake of the revolutionary triumph, and it was composed of Achá, Ruperto Fernández, and General Manuel Antonio Sánchez. This triumvirate promulgated the new Constitution of 1861 and eventually elected Achá as president. The newly appointed head of state sent Quevedo as Prefect and military governor or Beni, a position he held until 1864. When Achá was ousted that year by Mariano Melgarejo, Quevedo did not participate. Surprisingly, however, Melgarejo asked Quevedo to remain as governor of the Beni.

==== The Constitutionalist Revolution of 1865-1866 and diplomatic missions ====
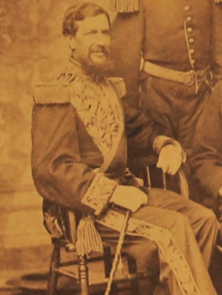
General Casto Arguedas proclaimed the Constitutionalist Revolution against Melgarejo in 1865.

Belzu would revolt against Melgarejo, in 1865, and even after the former's death, a Constitutionalist Revolution, which had no clear leader, also emerged. Among those who claimed leadership were Ildefonso Sanjinés, Casto Arguedas, and Nicanor Flores. In a long speech that Quevedo published that year, he declared himself a lover of peace and order who believed that the Constitutionalists were all charlatans and liars. Pledging his full support for Melgarejo, Quevedo ended his long Declaración.

In Toledo, Quevedo defeated the rebellion of Tito Andrade, whose goal was to occupy the city of Cochabamba. After Melgarejo scored a major victory on September 7 at Cantería, Quevedo was left as military governor of Cochabamba. However, shortly afterwards, he was defeated by Colonel Prudencio Barrientos and was forced to retreat to Melgarejo's camp. There, he was given command of a battalion and fought at Letanías, the last battle of the Constitutionalist Revolution, on January 24, 1866. Quevedo was appointed Prefect of Cobija, serving until July 3, 1867. That year, he was commissioned by Melgarejo to act as Minister Plenipotentiary to Brazil, Argentina, Uruguay, and Paraguay. Instead of heading to Rio de Janeiro, where he was ordered to go, he was given a special mission to Mexico instead. There, he congratulated the government of Benito Juárez for defeating the foreign and monarchist invaders during the Second French intervention in Mexico. After a month, Quevedo headed to Brazil to complete the treaty of friendship and commerce that was to be signed that year.

== Later career ==
=== The fall of Melgarejo and early plots ===
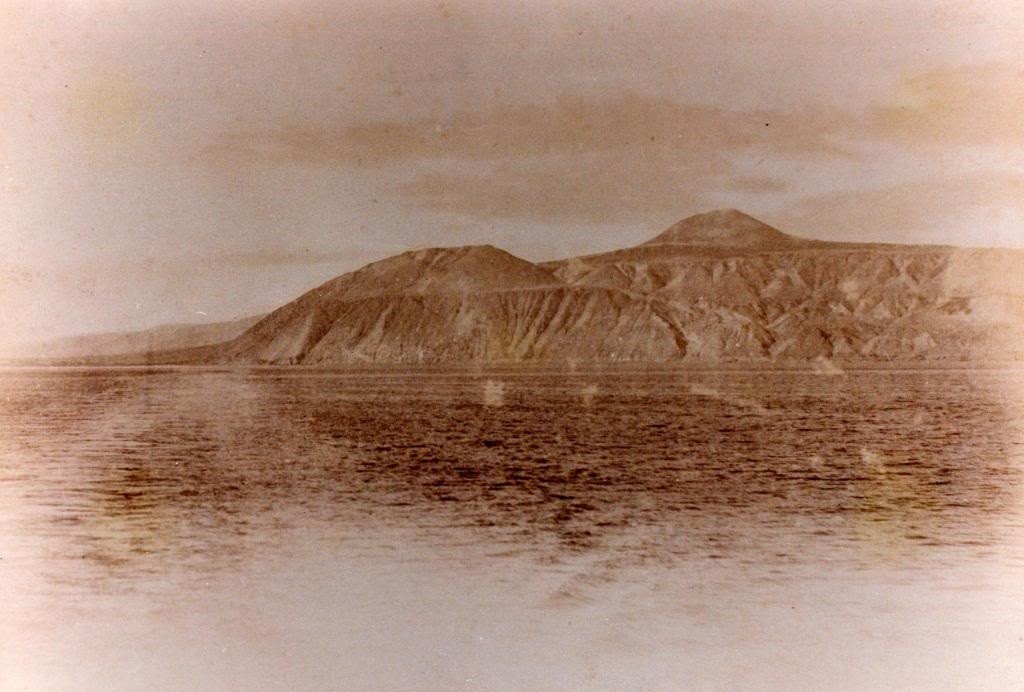
The Mejillones Bay, where Quevedo's expedition landed.

Quevedo was made Prefect of Cochabamba in 1870 and was elected Senator for the Department of Tarata, having held the presidency of the National Congress that had met in Oruro that year. The same Congress granted him the promotion to brigadier general, on September 3, declaring him an “Enlightened Citizen of Bolivia” as a reward for the eminent services he had rendered to the Bolivia in his diplomatic career.

After the fall of Melgarejo, on January 15, 1871, Quevedo, one of the favorites of the infamous caudillo, emigrated again to Peru and then moved to Chile, where he began to conspire tirelessly. In Valparaíso, he embarked on the steamer Tomé, carrying 104 mercenaries hired to make a revolution and several boxes of ammunition, weapons, and military uniforms, which were seized by the mayor of the city. Quevedo was a candidate for the presidency of the republic in 1872, and was defeated by his contender General Agustín Morales. He conspired again from Chilean coast, joined by other melgarejistas. Hopeful to obtain the support of the Chilean Government and, thus, fulfill his aspirations, Quevedo continued to scheme in Valparaíso. He left Valparaíso aboard the steamer Paquete de los Vilos on August 1, 1872, leading 180 men, Chileans and Bolivians, well armed and equipped. Furthermore, he also brought the brigantine María Luisa, containing 700 rifles, four mountain cannons and plenty of ammunition. He landed in Chimba (Antofagasta), proclaiming himself Supreme Chief of Bolivia; However, he was defeated by the Prefect of the Litoral, Ruperto Fernández, who was aware of the landing and had left Cobija in command of the Omasuyos battalion, the police, and two pieces of artillery. Quevedio took refuge in the Morro and López de Gama steamers, which belonged to Chilean industrialists. The Quevedo Expedition, as it had become known, had serious consequences, as it pushed Bolivia further toward Peru and soured relations with Chile.

=== The General Elections of 1873 ===
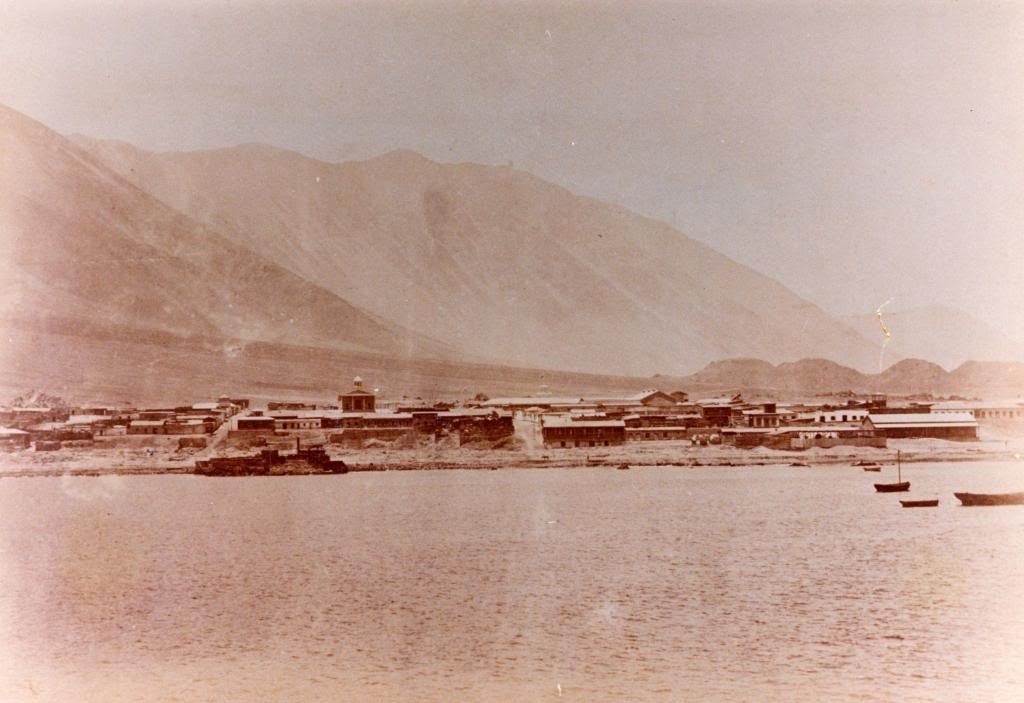
Cobija, Bolivia's main port.

Although Quevedo had been defeated in his earlier expedition, he was to participate in the General Elections of 1873 as a candidate. Adolfo Ballivián and Casimiro Corral were the other two candidates and represented their own groups, usually deemed constitutionalist parties. These were the rojos and the corralistas. On the other hand, Quevedo represented the recently defeated group of the melgarejistas. This faction hoped to retake the lands which had been repatriated to its previous owners, seized by the government of Melgarejo and bestowed to his loyal allies. The top three candidates of the elections were Ballivián, Corral, and Quevedo, receiving 6,442, 5,352, and 3,313 votes respectively. There was a total of 16,674 votes, and none of the candidates achieved the majority necessary according to the Constitution, meaning that the National Assembly was now tasked to choose among the three candidates with the most votes. The first round concluded in 31 votes for Ballivián, 20 for Corral, and 6 for Quevedo. The second round, contested between Ballivián and Corral ended with the former obtaining 41 votes and the latter 19. Thus, Ballivián defeated both Corral and Quevedo and was proclaimed President of Bolivia. Quevedo, as he had promised prior to his candidature, accepted and acknowledged the victor of the elections as the legitimate successor to the Presidency.

=== Member of the Chamber of Deputies ===
The quevedista party would remain prominent in the government, with Quevedo himself being elected as a Deputy for Cochabamba. In August 1873, a discussion as to whether a constitutional reform should be made caused great disparities in the government. The calls for reform emanated from Article 70 of the Constitution which stated that in case of the sudden death, illness, or extended absence of the President, the President of the Council of State shall call elections and fulfill the remainder of their predecessor's term. It was proposed that instead of staying for the remainder of the term, that after four months the elect assume the presidency. Quevedo would actually oppose the proposal, leading to the outright rejection of the "unnecessary reform".

On August 21, 1873, the signing of the boundary treaty with Chile was announced as government legislature, one which Quevedo, alongside the majority of the Chamber of Deputies, approved. However, with the death of Ballivián in 1874, Frías found himself again as President of Bolivia. Quevedo, alongside several other rebellious generals, would incite insurrection, namely in his native Cochabamba.

=== A final defeat ===
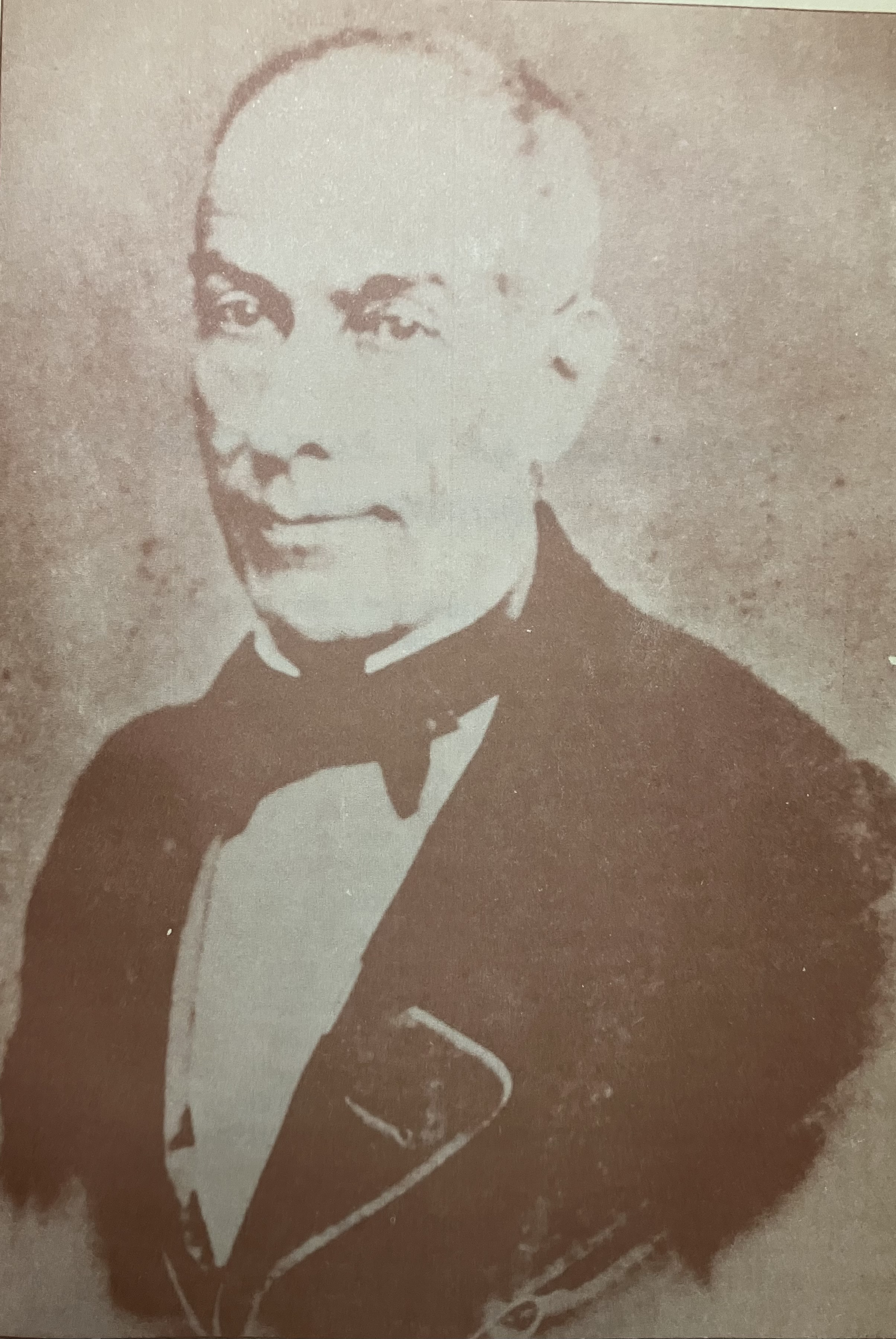
Tomás Frías led the government forces and defeated Quevedo at Chacoma.

Although Quevedo had been defeated in the elections of 1873, he did not surrender his aspirations of occupying the Palacio Quemado and continued conspiring to take power by any means, plotting with even more tenacity. Joining his contender, Casimiro Corral, he organized an army of thousand two hundred men, having left La Paz on the morning of January 10, 1875. At the center of the government forces, President Tomás Frías personally led the government troops, having left Calamarca on the 14th at the head of an army of 600 men.

Quevedo stationed his army at the ranch of Chacoma, a place that was dominated by a gentle slope in the direction of Calamarca, exactly where Frias was coming from. On January 18, the government forces arrived and, catching the rebels by surprise, attacked. At first, there was heavy fire from rebel machine guns, their smoke darkening the atmosphere for a moment. Their projectiles fell two meters in front of the government army's line, which, throwing a general hurrah, continued marching forward. Colonel Ramon González advanced with his company, which fought with reckless courage. Colonel Juan Granier entered the fight on foot at the head of his company. President Frias, present at the battlefield, participated in the early stages of the action. He continued even after the combat began to harden, and with his two ministers, Mariano Baptista and Daniel Calvo, refused to withdraw to the reserves. His son, Carlos Frías, tried to stop him, warning his father that he could get killed. The 70-year-old President replied: "What does it matter?" He then signaled his troops ahead in the midst of the bullets. The impetuous and brave advance of the constitutional forces on enemy lines stood firm and organized. The fighting of the government troops was so ferocious that, after sustaining a 25-minute fire, they found the rebel forces completely dispersed and defeated. Very few casualties were inflicted on the constitutional forces. Among the dead were: Colonel Jacinto Matos, who was in the vanguard as captain, and two soldiers from the 1st battalion; Casto Eizaguirre, of the same company, and Lieutenant Colonel Rudesindo Niño de Guzmán, and 8 soldiers. Quevedo's troops suffered 100 casualties, and only 583 prisoners were taken since many rebel soldiers had fled at the beginning of the battle.

Quevedo withdrew, leaving the aforementioned 538 prisoners, two cannons, two machine guns and forty five ammunition boxes. After this defeat, he was sentenced to death by the courts of justice. Quevedo managed to flee to the Peru, where he continued to plot with Corral. With the coup d'état of General Hilarión Daza, Quevedo "felt discarded from the political scene and he dies as he was born, ostracized, far from the land of his parents and his home, the beautiful Cochabamba". His days as a plotter and his endless conspiracies had finally come to an end.

== Death and burial ==
His excessive ambition for power and bad luck in his revolutionary enterprises took a toll on him, leading to the poor health which ended his life. Quevedo died on August 24, 1876, at 51 years old. By supreme decree, promulgated on November 21, 1878, his remains were repatriated from the city of Puno to Cochabamba, arriving in La Paz on December 9 of the same year, where a military funeral with full honors, corresponding to his rank, was held.

== Bibliography ==
- Velarde, Juan Francisco; Carranza, Angel Justiniano (1868). Rasgos biograficos del Coronel Quintin Quevedo: enviado extraordinario y Ministro Plenipotenciario de Bolivia en el Brasil y Republicas del Plata (in Spanish). Imprenta de Mayo.
- Díaz Arguedas, Julio (1929). Los generales de Bolivia (rasgos biográficos) 1825-1925: prólogo de Juan Francisco Bedregal (in Spanish). Imp. Intendencia General de Guerra.
- Sanjinés, Jenaro (1902). Apuntes para la historia de Bolivia bajo las administraciones de don Adolfo Ballivián I [i.e. y] don Tomás Frías (in Spanish). Impr. Bolivar de M. Pizarro.
