= José María Calderón =

Bolivian military officer (1780–1834)

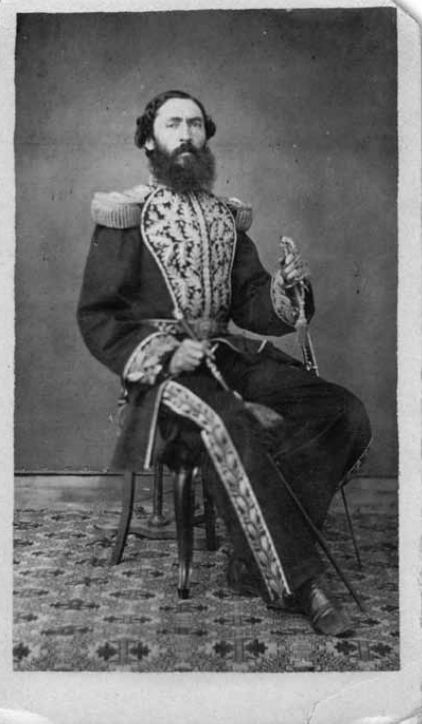

Personal details
- Born: José María Calderón Bittencourt; 12 October 1820 La Paz, Republic of Bolivia
- Died: 18 October 1872 (aged 52) Inquisive, Bolivia
- Spouse: Gertrudis Peñailillo Borda
- Parent(s): Daniel Calderón Rada; Eulalia Roberta Bittencourt Jones

Military service
- Allegiance: Bolivia
- Branch/service: Bolivian Army
- Years of service: 1841–1871
- Rank: Brigadier general
- Battles/wars: Peruvian–Bolivian War of 1841–42; Battle of Ingavi

José María Calderón (12 October 1820 – 18 October 1872), also known as el Cachorro, was a Bolivian military officer. Known to be brave in the battlefield, he rose through the ranks and eventually aligned himself with the dictatorship of Mariano Melgarejo. José María de Achá would sentence Calderón to death in 1861. In order to avoid the sentence, Calderón fled to the Bolivian interior where he spent years in the Llanos de Moxos.

== Early life ==
He was born in La Paz to Daniel Calderón Rada and Eulalia Roberta Bittencourt Jones. His father was a wealthy landowner, son of Felipe Calderón de la Barca Lopetegui and Fernanda Josefina Rada Guzmán de Mendoza y Rivero.

== In the Bolivian Army ==
Calderón started his classes in the Military College of La Paz when he was 18 years old. However, while he was still training to become a military officer, the Peruvian–Bolivian War of 1841–42 erupted. Spearheaded by the efforts of Agustín Gamarra, Bolivia's independence was at great risk.

Calderón enlisted in the army and was at the Battle of Ingavi under the command of General José Ballivián. He is said to have acted with great valour during the battle, where he was wounded. For his actions, he was promoted to first lieutenant.

== Rebel within the army ==
Calderón remained loyal to General Ballivián until 1846. That year, he was persuaded to join the efforts of José Miguel de Velasco to oust the ballivianistas from power. In 1847, Velasco ousted Ballivián. However, Eusebio Guilarte took command of the country. Within days, Velasco defeated the remaining ballivianistas in Bolivia, becoming President of Bolivia. For his loyalty, Calderón was promoted to the rank of captain.

Calderón did not hesitate to abandon Velasco when Manuel Isidoro Belzu challenged the President. Now an adherent to the belcista cause, Calderón helped overthrow Velasco less than a year after the coup that ousted Ballivián. As a reward he was promoted to the rank of major.

For his continued loyalty toward Belzu, the caudillo promoted him to the rank of lieutenant colonel in 1855. However, despite having been an ardent supporter of Belzu for years, Calderón supported the cause of José María Linares, which sought to end the rule of the belcista President Jorge Córdova. On September 9, 1857, the linaristas overthrew the government of President Córdova. Linares promoted Calderón to the rank of colonel for his loyalty.

== Exile and return to Bolivia ==
Shortly after Linares became president, Calderón was exiled. Despite his loyalty toward Linares, Calderón was not trusted by the President. Arriving in Puno, Calderón found the city full of Bolivian exiles looking to return. With the help of other belcistas, Calderón returned from exile in 1860. At the time, Linares was facing a major rebellion against his dictatorship. José María de Achá eventually betrayed Linares and ousted him. Now President, Achá was distrustful of Calderón so he sentenced him to death. Calderón escaped the sentence by hiding in Beni. Achá's presidency was a disaster and within a few years, Bolivia was engulfed by chaos and anarchy. Sensing an opportunity, Calderón joined General Mariano Melgarejo in his efforts to oust the unpopular Achá. By the end of that year, Achá was ousted by Melgarejo.

Now a partisan of the melgarejista party, Calderón remained loyal to Melgarejo. In 1865, a major uprising against Melgarejo erupted throughout the country. Led by generals Casto Arguedas, Ildefonso Sanjinés, and Nicanor Flores, the Constitutionalist Revolution nearly ousted Melgarejo. However, scoring major victories in the Battle of Cantería, Calderón was promoted to the rank of brigadier general. He continued his support for Melgarejo and defeated another rebel army at the Battle of Letanías.

== Fall from grace and death ==
Calderón remained loyal to Melgarejo until his overthrow on January 15, 1871. He was present at the barracks of La Paz, where he was captured. He was taken to Inquisive, where he remained a prisoner until his death on October 18, 1872.

== Marriage and family ==
He married Gertrudis Peñailillo Borda in may 1861 in La Paz. She was the daughter of general Ambrosio Peñailillo.
