= Nicanor Flores =

Bolivian military officer

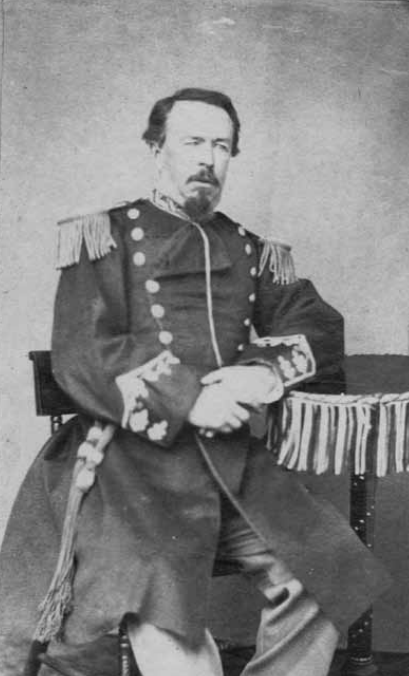

Personal details
- Born: Narciso Nicanor Flores Velasco; January 29, 1820 Buenos Aires, United Provinces of the Río de la Plata
- Died: July 14, 1892 (aged 72) Salta, Argentina
- Citizenship: Bolivia, Argentina
- Spouse: Etelvina Dalence Bellot
- Children: Gregorio Flores Dalence; Leandro Flores Dalence; Ignacia Flores Dalence; Jorge Flores Dalence; Enrique Flores Dalence
- Parent(s): Francisco de Paula Flores y Markholtz; Josefa Luisa Velasco y Ruiz
- Profession: Military officer

Military service
- Allegiance: Republic of Bolivia
- Branch/service: Bolivian Army
- Years of service: 1841–1880
- Rank: Division general
- Battles/wars: Peruvian-Bolivian War of 1841-1842; War of the Pacific

Nicanor Flores (29 January 1820 – 14 July 1892) was an Argentine-born Bolivian military officer who rose to prominence during the presidency of José María Linares. Starting his military career during the Peruvian-Bolivian War of 1841-1842, he fought valiantly at the Battle of Ingavi, and also played a role during the War of the Pacific. He was married to the daughter of Pantaleón Dalence.

== Early life and military career ==
=== Beginnings ===
Born in Buenos Aires, Argentina, on January 29, 1820, he was the son of Francisco de Paula Flores and Josefa Luisa Velasco. His father was appointed chief magistrate of Salta in 1825, prompting the family to move to that city.

Although his parents had planned for him to be a lawyer, Flores escaped to Bolivia in 1841. At the time of his arrival, Peru had launched an invasion of Bolivia. Determined to become a soldier, he entered the army as a second lieutenant of Infantry in the 8th battalion, heroically fighting at the Battle of Ingavi, where he was promoted by José Ballivián to the rank of first lieutenant on 21 November of the same year.

During the government of General Ballivian, Flores devoted himself to his new career, being promoted to the rank of captain in January 1845; in 1847, Flores was promoted to the rank of major, being the third in command of his battalion. By March 1849, he was granted the rank of commander. With the fall of presidents Ballivián, Guilarte and Velasco, Manuel Isidoro Belzu had seized power and started the persecution of all ballivianistas. Flores was among the persecuted and was forced to retire from the army as a result.

=== Incident in Peru ===
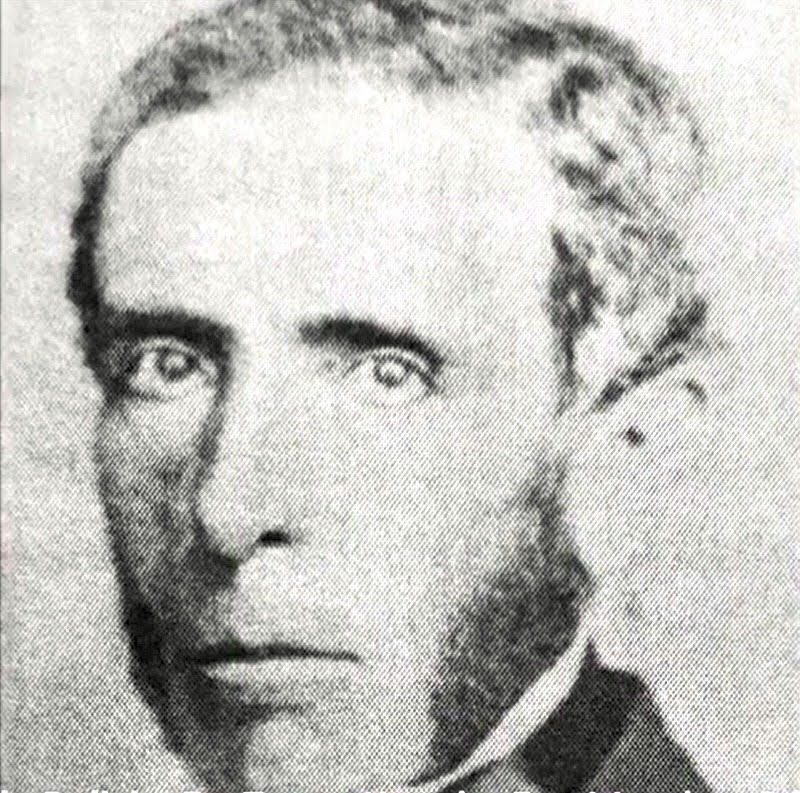
President Linares in 1860.

In 1857, he took part, with the rank of lieutenant colonel, in the linarista revolution, having been appointed by the revolutionary council of Potosí as Commander of Arms of the garrison. In 1860, promoted by Linares to the rank of colonel, he was assigned as commander of the 10th battalion. At the head of said battalion, Flores crossed the Dasaguadero River and reached Yunguyo in pursuit of some political prisoners who had taken refuge in Peru. This controversy pushed the Peruvian government to militarize in preparation for a war against Bolivia, mounting an army of 15,000. However, with the threat of war averted, Flores headed to Copacabana in pursuit of the indigenous bands that had revolted against Linares in favor of Belzu.

In an act of cruelty, Flores entered the town making and hunted the persecuted like animals, brutally murdering most of the rebels and taking five prisoners; they were executed soon thereafter.

== The Constitutionalist Revolution of 1865 ==
=== Achá and Melgarejo regimes ===
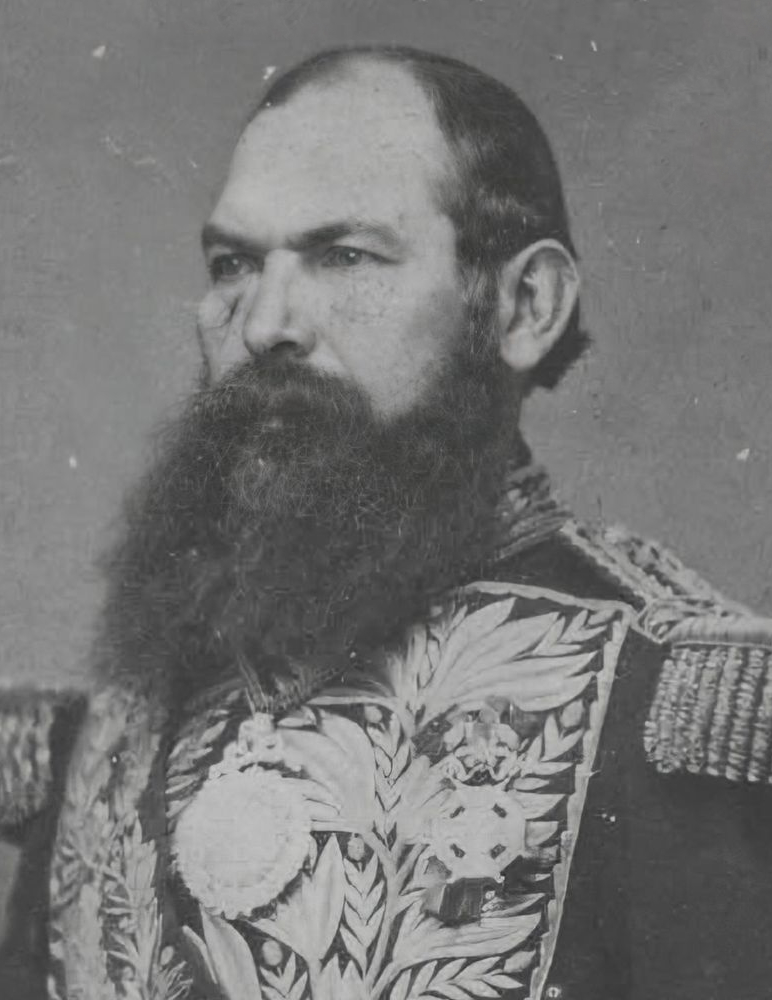
Mariano Melgarejo.

After Linares was toppled in 1861 by José María de Achá, Flores revolted in Sucre alongside General Pedro Olañeta and Colonel Agustín Morales and proclaimed the Argentine Ruperto Fernández as President.

This, however, failed and Flores was forced to flee, taking refuge in Argentina. There, he waited for the opportune moment to return to Bolivia. Finally, in 1864, he found a propitious occasion to return when General Achá was ousted, directly heading to the city of Potosí. It was in that city that he proclaimed himself against Mariano Melgarejo, leading a revolution against this caudillo in July 1865. On July 1, Flores and the police imprisoned the melgarejista commander of the south General Pedro España. He proceeded to build barricades in the city in preparation for Melgarejo's attack.

The people of the city, grateful, helped him by giving him weapons, men, and money, and rewarding him with the rank of brigadier general. The city was ready for the fight and had received some reinforcements from Sucre; however, misunderstandings and disagreements among the revolutionary leaders Generals Flores, Achá, Sebastián Ágreda, Ildefonso Sanjinés, and Casto Arguedas, were greatly detrimental to the cause. These disagreements came to favor Melgarejo, who, after penetrating the barricades of the Potosí, massacred a handful of young men, among them the famed Bolivian poet Néstor Galindo, and defeated the rebels at the Battle of Cantería.

General Flores found asylum again in Argentina, where he lived until the fall of Melgarejo in 1871. Once he was back to Bolivia, he was reinstated in the army and challenged Narciso Campero to duel, in August 1875. The reason behind this was that Flores was criticized by Camper in the latter's memoirs. This duel was to take place in the Argentine border town of La Quiaca, but was stopped by the authorities.

== The War of the Pacific and later life ==
At outbreak of the War of the Pacific, General Flores was lurking on the Peruvian coast as a political exile, looking to return. However President Hilarión Daza, reinstated Flores into the army and invited him to represent Bolivia to the Agua Santa council of chiefs, where the defense of San Francisco was discussed. At that meeting, Flores said the following words: "Gentlemen, give me command of an army and I swear I shall triumph". His request was not accepted and later resulted in the disaster at San Francisco.

General Flores rode through the battlefield and, seeing that the allied soldiers retreated, he attempted to contain the complete dispersion of the army but failed. Flores remained in Peru throughout the remainder of Daza's presidency, waiting for the opportune moment to return. When Daza was deposed by General Campero, Flores offered his services to the new government, having been appointed Superior and Political Chief of the South, where, hoping for the victory of the allied army, he raised a war loan with which he bought weapons and ammunition. He also organized the 6th Division, composed of fifteen hundred men grouped into the following units: Calama, Ayacucho, Reconquista, Liberty and Potosi.

However, Flores never engaged in battle and was dismissed by the orders of his rival, President Campero. After the National Convention of 1880 would award him a gold medal for services rendered to the republic during the war with Chile, Flores retired from the army sometime around 1882, heading to Argentina in 1883. He died in Salta, on July 14, 1892.
