= Ildefonso Sanjinés =

Bolivian military officer

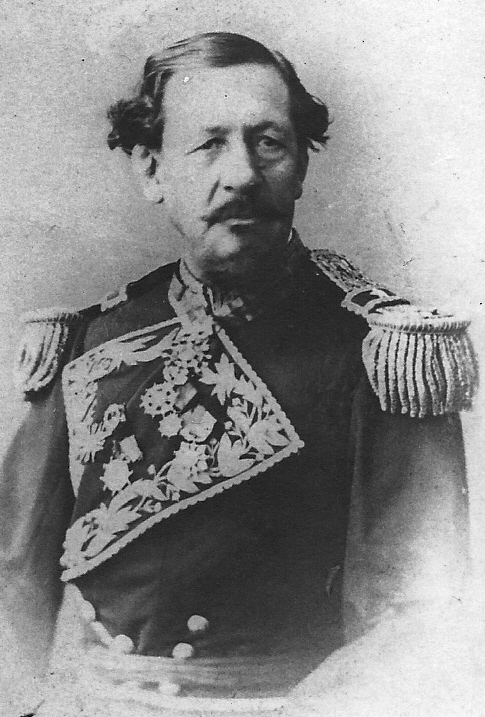

Minister of War
- In office 22 October 1871 – 9 May 1873
- President: Agustín Morales; Tomás Frías
- Preceded by: Narciso Campero
- Succeeded by: Mariano Ballivián
- In office 16 January 1874 – 13 May 1874
- President: Adolfo Ballivián; Tomás Frías
- Preceded by: Mariano Ballivián
- Succeeded by: Hilarión Daza

Personal details
- Born: June 12, 1812 La Paz, Bolivia
- Died: December 2, 1882 Cochabamba, Bolivia
- Spouse: María Casta Quiroga Nava y Guzmán
- Children: Casta Sanjinés Quiroga; Justa Sanjinés Quiroga; René Sanjinés Quiroga; Adelina Sanjinés Quiroga; Guillermo Sanjinés Quiroga; Josefa Sanjinés Quiroga
- Parent(s): José Mariano Calderón de la Barca Sanjinés; Petrona de Rada

Military service
- Allegiance: Bolivia
- Branch/service: Bolivian Army
- Rank: Division general
- Battles/wars: War of the Confederation; Peruvian-Bolivian War of 1841-1842

Ildefonso Sanjinés Rada (12 June 1812 – 2 December 1882) was a Bolivian military officer who served as Minister of War twice during the presidencies of Agustín Morales, Tomás Frías, and Adolfo Ballivián. Sanjinés served during the War of the Confederation and the Peruvian-Bolivian War of 1841-1842, fighting valiantly during the Battle of Ingavi.

== Early life ==
He was born in the city of La Paz in 1812, the son of José Mariano Calderón de la Barca Sanjinés and Petrona de Rada. He entered the army as a cadet in the 10th battalion of the Guardia at the age of fourteen. In December 1831, he was promoted to second lieutenant and took part in almost all the battles of the War of the Confederation.

== Military career ==
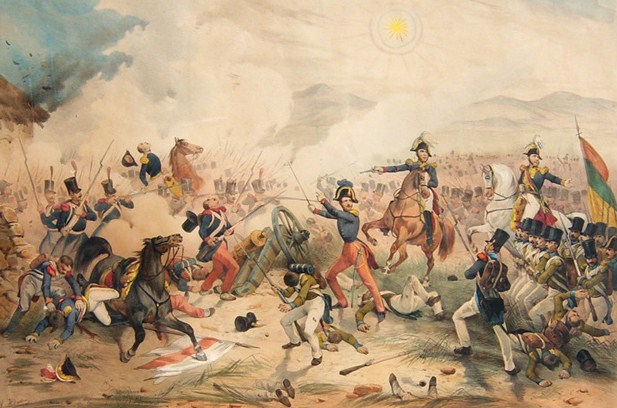
The Battle of Ingavi.

At the battle of Yanacocha, he fought heroically at the head of a company, earning him the rank of captain. Having been a part of the battles of Socabaya, Iruya, and Montenegro, he eventually reached the rank of lieutenant colonel. However, where Sanjinés demonstrated his talents as a leader was at the Battle of Ingavi where he led the 7th battalion.

During Ingavi, Sanjinés was stationed with the reserve together with lieutenant colonel Manuel Isidoro Belzu. In those times, the battalions in the reserve were often considered to the best in an army and, therefore, the most trusted. This was a distinction which was considered to reflect the capacity of an officer to lead his company. During the beginning of the battle, it is said that the rest of the army bet which of the two battalions, Belzu's or Sanjinés', would advance further into the enemy camp and would fight with more courage.

The Battle of Ingavi resulted in a crushing defeat for the Peruvians, as they had also lost their commander and President, Agustín Gamarra. It is said that at the end of the battle Belzu and Sanjinés hugged each other for a long time and, in silence, congratulated each other for the brilliant triumph they had obtained. Both were promoted on the battlefield to the rank of colonel, and, in 1846, Congress promoted Sanjinés to the rank of brigadier general.

== Political career ==
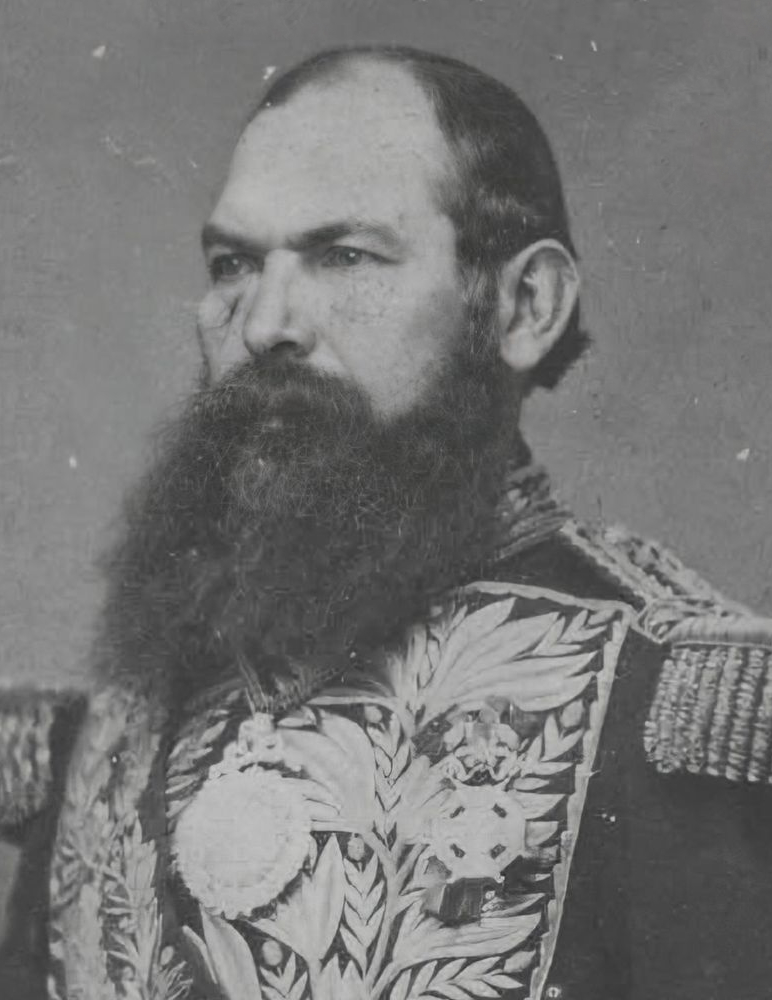
Sanjinés unsuccessfully attempted to oust his enemy, Mariano Melgarejo, in 1865.

He was an important supporter of José Ballivián until his overthrow in 1847 by Belzu. After Belzu's coup, Sanjinés was appointed commander of the garrison of Cochabamba. However, he remained informed about the politics of his time, like all military officers of that time, and was to leave his retirement to join the revolution against José Miguel de Velasco. Sanjinés took part in many revolutions and mutinies, including in 1854 against Belzu. For this his insurrection, he was erased from the military officer's list of the Bolivian Army and declared a national traitor. During the presidency of José María de Achá, Sanjinés had attempted to rebel in support of Belzu, however, fearing a takeover by Mariano Melgarejo, he allied himself to Achá and was made a member of the powerful Council of State on October 28, 1864.

Sanjinés was noted for being an implacable enemy of the Mariano Melgarejo and, in 1865, found himself the Battle of Cantería at the command of a rebellious division from Cochabamba. However, Melgarejo defeated the revolutionary forces and Sanjinés fled to the North where he offered his services to General Casto Arguedas, who gave him command of a division which fought at Litanies against the government forces. Ultimately, Sanjinés and his accomplice, General Nicanor Flores, were defeated and he fled to Peru to escape the wrath of the "barbarian" Melgarejo.

Melgarejo was able to remain in power for several years, however, in the latter half of the year 1870, a massive revolution broke out in La Paz. Melgarejo attempted to violently crush the rebellion but failed. The revolution triumphed on January 15, 1871, forcing Melgarejo out of power. Sanjinés would play a crucial and leading role in the beginning and victorious end of said revolution. A Constituent Assembly was installed to remedy the chaos in which the country fund itself in. Sanjinés was a member of said assembly as a representative elected by the La Paz Department and was promoted to the rank of divisional general by the end of that year.

The newly appointed President of Bolivia, Agustín Morales, appointed Sanjinés as Minister of War and Secretary General. After the sudden death of Morales', Sanjinés was one of the most important officers who maintained public order, which had been altered as a result of the President, supporting the constitutional succession of Tomás Frías.

== Later life and death ==
Due to his advanced age and the poor state of his health, he did not join the Bolivian Army in the War of the Pacific and would die in the city of Cochabamba in 1882, aged 70 years old.
