= Casto Arguedas =

Bolivian military officer

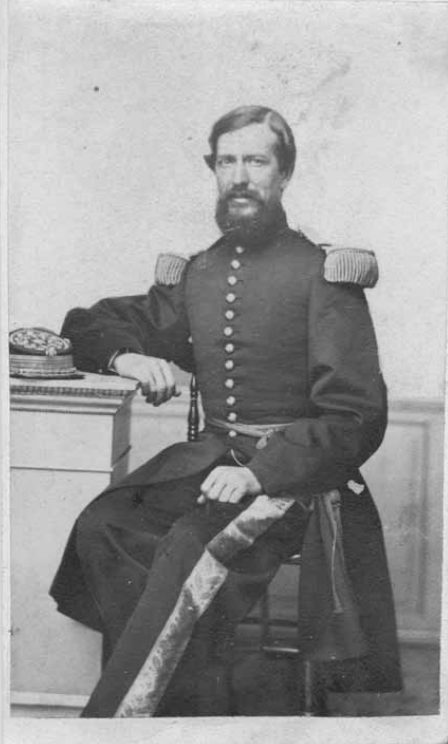

Personal details
- Born: April 23, 1820 La Paz, Bolivia
- Died: March 4, 1888 Araca, Bolivia
- Spouse: Domitila Arce Salinas
- Children: Juan Fernando Arguedas Arce; Clodomiro Arguedas Arce; Lucia Arguedas Arce
- Parent(s): Enrique Arguedas Molina; Juliana Manuela La Madrid Salas

Military service
- Allegiance: Bolivia
- Branch/service: Bolivian Army
- Years of service: 1841–1880
- Rank: Brigadier general

Casto Arguedas (23 April 1820 – 4 March 1888) was a Bolivian military officer who held the position of Commander in Chief of the Bolivian Army on two occasions in 1879 and between 1885 and 1887. He was a prominent political figure of his time and was at the helm of the Constitutionalist Revolution of 1865–1866, which attempted to overthrow Mariano Melgarejo.

== Military career ==
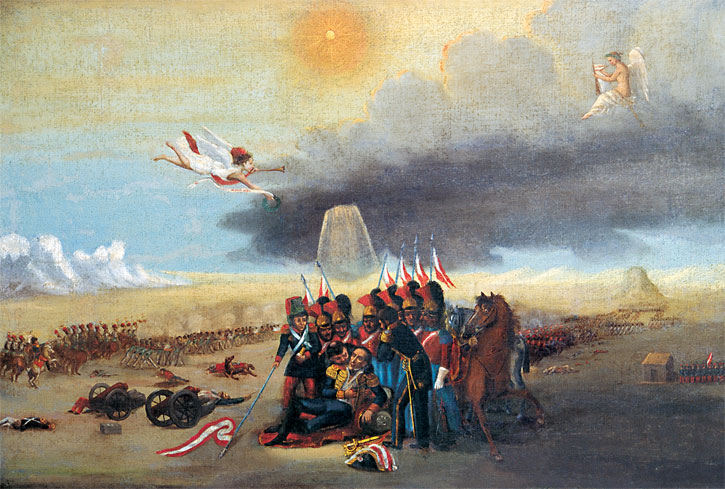
The death of Agustín Gamarra during the Battle of Ingavi.

In 1841, Arguedas was going to finish his university studies when the second Peruvian invasion of Bolivia took place. It was then that all able bodied men throughout the entirety of Bolivia had to take up arms to defend their country, and Arguedas was among them. Incorporated into the Carabineros battalion as a cadet, he soon demonstrated his military aptitudes and excellent leadership skills, qualities with which he was able to win the appreciation and esteem of his superiors who began to look at him with deference. When the Battle of Ingavi, on November 18, took place, Arguedas was cited on the order of the day because of his fearlessness and courage, a great distinction for any cadet. General José Ballivián wanted to reward the heroic performance of the young Arguedas and awarded him the rank of lieutenant, with which the young officer campaigned in Peru when the Bolivian Army occupied the departments of Puno, Arequipa and Moquegua. During his stay in that territory, he was promoted to second lieutenant and in November 1844 to first lieutenant.

== Political career ==
Manuel Isidoro Belzu would persecute and force Arguedas into exile.

In 1847, Arguedas, who held the rank of captain, was to become a crucial figure in the rise of Manuel Isidoro Belzu. On October 12, 1848, at nightfall, he led a revolt with the Carabineros battalion in favor of General Belzu in Yotala, marching on the city of Sucre, located three leagues away, and successfully seized the plaza. When President José Miguel de Velasco was informed of this event, the National Guard was sent with nearly three thousand men in order to subdue the revolted battalion, composed of only two hundred and forty men.

On the morning of the 13th, both forces encountered in the outskirts of the city, and the National Guard were completely overwhelmed by Arguedas' men, who after courageous and almost heroic manoeuvres obtained an unlikely triumph over Velasco. Arguedas, seeing himself victorious, decided to join other forces that had also revolted in Oruro in favor of Belzu, and set off in that direction. However, at the behest of General Torrelio, he countermarched with the battalion to Sucre and, before arriving, he was surprised on the banks of the Quirpinchaca stream by a division that had come from Potosí under the orders of President Velasco. Arguedas, whose men had no more than five cartridges each, fought desperately until the ammunition was exhausted. The rebels dispersed to meet again in Oruro under the command of Arguedas, who was promoted to rank of sergeant major by the supreme decree of October 28, promulgated by General Belzu in the revolutionary army. Although Arguedas had helped Belzu reach the presidency in 1848, he was still persecuted and eventually driven into exile.

== Exile ==
=== An incident in Peru ===
Arguedas lived retired from the army for about ten years and went to Peru to a small town near the border and stretched out on the barren slopes of a gray mountain range, on the shores of Lake Titicaca. It is on a farm near that town, in Huallatiri, where Arguedas lived alone with no other company than that of a servant. It happened that, being an employee of some rich owners and merchants of that region, the young Arguedas had managed to seduce the wife of the main employer, from whom he obtained not only favors but also a deep affection. The woman was strong-tempered and her affection deep. For instance, when she learned through her loyal servant that her husband was arming the employees of the house and the indigenous workers of the hacienda to kill Arguedas, she went to the farm to inform her lover of what had happened and to warn him of the imminence of the attack. Arguedas is said to not have been intimidated and, loading his weapon, he remained waiting for the attack, despite the fact that the lovers could have well fled to the safety of the nearby town of Huancané. At last, the armed mob led by the offended husband, the butler and a few employees showed up in the afternoon. The owner entered the house and, with a revolver in hand and determined to avenge the offense single-handedly. However, he fell to the ground, shot dead with a single bullet. The butler then entered and was also shot dead. Then, the hila cata, the highest indigenous authority of the town, entered and was also shot, rolling on the ground mortally wounded. Every shot Arguedas fired caused either death or a mortal wound. There was no one who dared to go into the hallway of that low-lying country house, surrounded by the classic Spanish patio of rooms with doors above it and barred windows facing the countryside, with a red roof of tile or blackish of straw, and the clean sun that gilds the paved floor. The mob, defeated, remained outside, without daring to attack, terrified from the three or four corpses before them that obstructed the hall. However, they remained determined to punish Arguedas.

=== Imprisonment and return to Bolivia ===
Someone proposed to burn down the house and the mob welcomed the idea with shouts of enthusiasm. However, then the adulteress appeared and calmly declared: "I offer no opposition; who will answer to me for the value of the house and what it holds inside? I have 5,000 pesos in crops and materials; the property alone costs 20,000 pesos; the total amounts to 25,000 pesos... If you pay me, you may burn the house. Magnificent and undaunted, she went to a room bordering the hallway and where Arguedas, rifle in hand, was holed in. The mob did not dare to burn the house. As the afternoon became night, the Huancané military police arrived, notified by a messenger, and Arguedas was taken prisoner. He was imprisoned for nine months; however, the chaotic and almost anarchic internal politics of Peru allowed him to flee back to Bolivia. Arguedas secretly entered Bolivia, settling on a distant valley and went to live in the small town of Araca, where he bought some land that would later become a vast estate.

== Rehabilitation in the army ==
=== The Constitutionalist Revolution of 1865-1866 ===
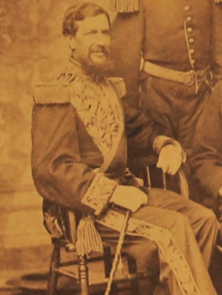
Arguedas as the leader of the Constitutionalist Revolutionary Army.

Rehabilitated by Melgarejo, in December 1864, with the rank of colonel, Arguedas was made commander of the garrison of La Paz. When the revolution led by General Belzu broke out in March 1865, having for this reason left office and retired to his home, Arguedas soon realized his mistake and chose to take up arms against Melgarejo. Consequently, he agreed to lead the revolutionary forces in La Paz in May of the same year soon after Belzu's death. Colonel Arguedas was acclaimed by the popular masses of La Paz and proclaimed provisional President of Bolivia, being granted the rank of brigadier general. He organized an army of two thousand men, known as the Constitutionalist Army, while Melgarejo was in Potosí crushing another rebellion against him. The people of La Paz, powerful as ever, took up arms and raised a flag in which the two slogans were engraved: "War on Melgarejo; avenge the spilled blood of Belzu". This popular revolution did not echo any personal ambition, rather it was the spontaneous pronouncement of a people who wanted to establish a truly democratic and constitutional republic; that is why it was called "Constitutionalist". Arguedas, although new to the Bolivian political scene, was known for his military courage. Arguedas issued a decree which stated the following:

Article 1 - From the date, I assume the provisional presidency of the Republic. Article 2 - Ninety days after the republic recognizes the authority created by the May Revolution, electoral commissions will be convened. Article 3 - Dr. Belisario Salinas is appointed senior government official and in charge of the general secretariat for now. Article 4 - Colonel Uladislao Silva will oversee the ministry of war.

Arguedas spread the proclamations to the people the army. Both documents contained the typical words of other revolutionary proclamations of Bolivia, such as: the return of freedom to the people; war without quarter to the tyrant; triumph of " the good cause"; cessation of fraud and coercion, theft and embezzlement; convening a national congress ninety days after the republic has been pacified; constitution of the executive power through free election; and the leaders of the revolution may not appear as candidates for the new government; days of glory and well-being for the people, etc., etc. Arguedas, head of the revolution, organized an army of two thousand men with all the reinforcements that came from Oruro, Cochabamba and Chayanta and even from the most remote provinces of the La Paz Department. Feeling strong enough to go out in search of the enemy, he detached his army to a radius of more than fifty leagues of La Paz. He left La Paz with the bulk of the army, and, on December 6, arrived in Oruro on the 11th. As Melgarejo approached, Arguedas decided to counter march to La Paz, despite the fact that some chiefs who surrounded him, José María de Achá, among them, advised him to wait for the enemy in Oruro or Huanuni. The retreat to La Paz was carried out in disorder and the army suffered several setbacks. Part of the artillery was abandoned on the road; the many supplies were left along the way. In the midst of this disastrous withdrawal, in which the desertions occurred daily and were numerous, Achá again urged Arguedas to fight, taking advantage of the Viscachani mountain range, between Sicasica and Ayoayo, which offered strategic advantages for a defensive action.

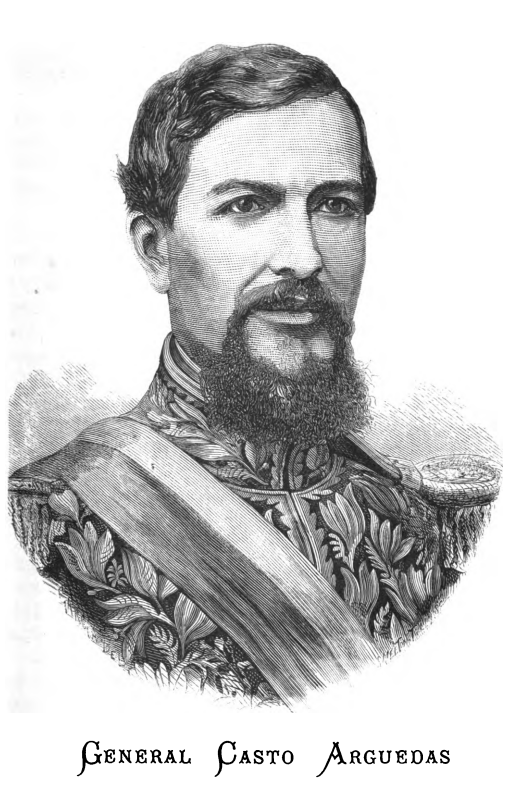
Casto Arguedas.

=== Melgarejo's victory at Letanías ===
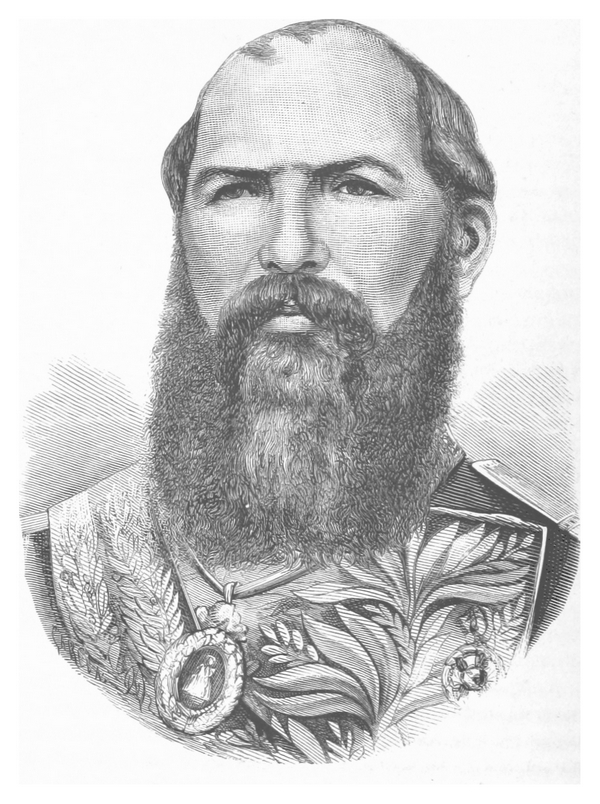
Mariano Melgarejo defeated Arguedas on January 24, 1866, sealing the fate of the Constitutionalist Army.

However, Arguedas, in a bold mood, disregarded all advice, causing Achá and General Nicanor Flores to desert, both going to Peru. Arguedas undoubtedly had the intention of waiting for Melgarejo behind the barricades he had ordered built in La Paz. Moreover, as he approached the city, he had received the message from some elite women of La Paz in which he was warned that, "if he returned there and allow them to fight, they would change their skirts for the uniforms of the soldiers, so that Arguedas would be in charge of their houses and children while thee women went to fight against Melgarejo”. Arguedas entrenched himself in Viacha, determined to wait there for the enemy and wage a pitched battle. The hill of Letanías, located to the south of the town of Viacha, was chosen for the site of entrenchment. On the hill, Arguedas took his positions in front of the Coniri road, where Melgarejo was supposed to come from. On the morning of January 24, 1866, Melgarejo, with generals Quintín Quevedo and José María Calderón, spotted the enemy line, extended and barricaded in the mountains. Melgarejo halted and ordered the army to dress for parade, and meanwhile began to observe, with a spyglass, from the top of a hill, watching the opposing army. Putting himself immediately at the head of his army, Melgarejo arranged it in closed columns, which had two pieces of artillery placed on each flank. The vanguard was covered with a body of riflemen. They marched until they faced Arguedas' men and immediately opened fire from both sides. The Constitutionalists soon abandoned their entrenched position as a result of some successful fire from Melgarejo's artillery. Melgarejo's army continued to advance in good order, and after half an hour of combat, many of the soldiers and chiefs of the Constitutionalist army had abandoned the battlefield. After another hour, everything was finished, leaving Melgarejo's army in control of the field, leaving more than six hundred dead and a multitude of wounded. The main leaders of the Constitutionalist Army had fled, leaving the victor more than five hundred prisoners. While the remains of his troops retreated to La Paz, General Arguedas fled to Peru, where he once again lived as an outlaw for five years. He returned to the country during the government of Tomás Frías, in 1874, and took part in some revolutionary movements against the Government. For these, he was sentenced to death by ordinary courts. However, he was spared and exiled instead.

== Later life and death ==
When General Hilarión Daza became president, Arguedas returned to Bolivia. He was given the position of Commander in Chief of the Bolivian Army, and, for this reason, he was recognized with the rank of brigadier general, given to him by the people back in 1865 and unrecognized until then. He held the prefecture of La Paz when War of the Pacific started in 1879; then, Arguedas, resigned from civil office and was appointed by Daza as Commander of the Second Division of the army. During the first months of operations, he held the position of Commander in Chief of the Bolivian Army until he was assigned to an important commission and returned to La Paz. When it was done, he joined the 5th Division commanded by General Narciso Campero, who made him head of the vanguard. Arguedas then returned to La Paz again, this time with the mission of making Colonel Miguel Armaza the commander of the Murillo battalion, an act that could not be carried out because Arguedas had been arrested during the riot that broke out in Viacha on March 12, 1880. In 1884, President Gregorio Pacheco named him Prefect of La Paz, entrusting him later with the position of Commander in Chief of the Army for a second time. In 1887, Arguedas chose to retire due to his declining health, retiring to his hacienda of Araca, where he died in 1888, at age of 68 years old.
