= Agustín Morales =

16th President of Bolivia (1808–1872)

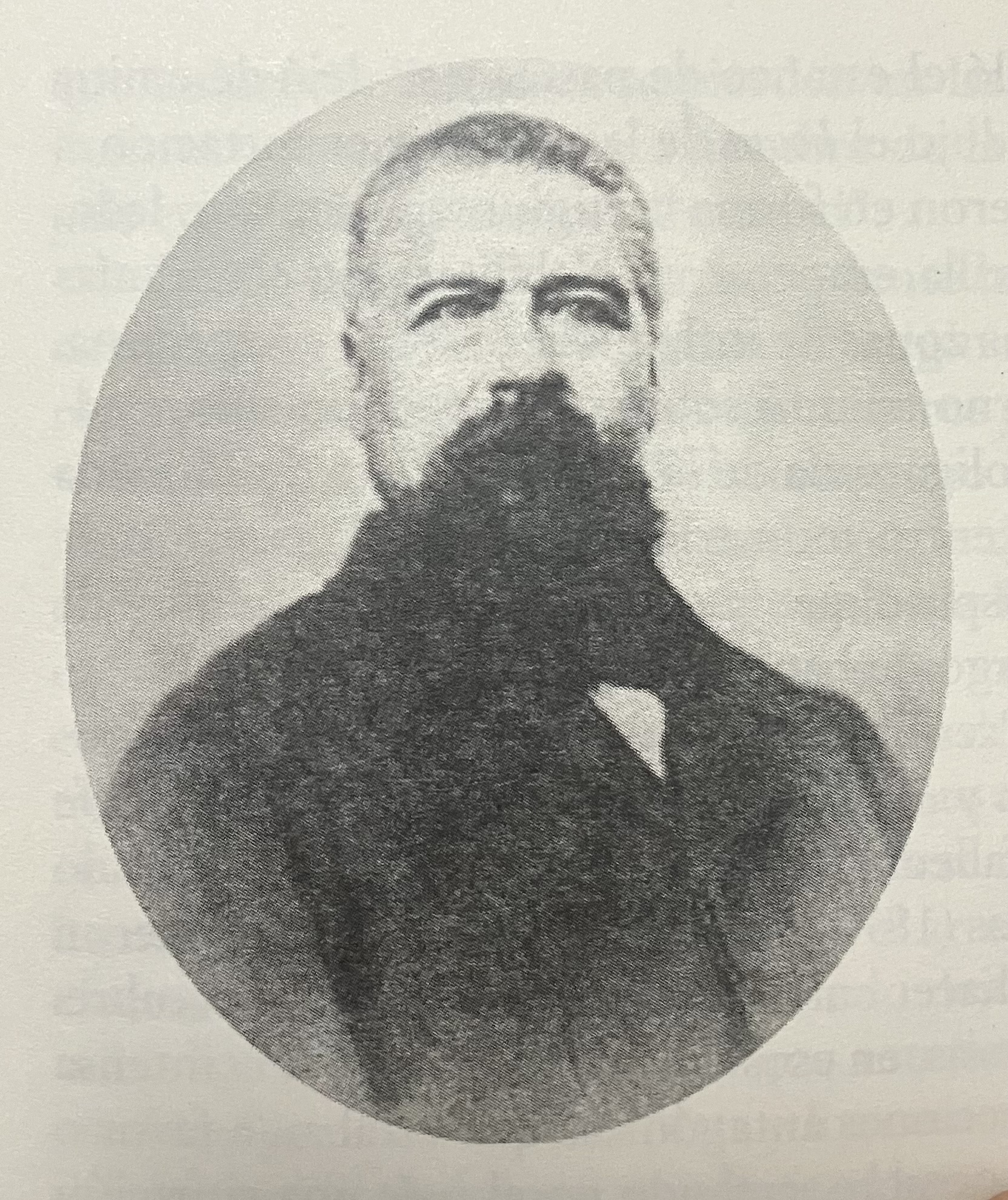

16th President of Bolivia
- In office 15 January 1871 – 27 November 1872 (Note: In dissidence since 26 November 1870.); Provisional: 21 January 1871 – 25 August 1872
- Preceded by: Mariano Melgarejo
- Succeeded by: Tomás Frías (Note: Tomás Frías assumed office as president of Bolivia the day after Agustín Morales' death. Some sources list President of the National Assembly Juan de Dios Bosque as acting president from the night of 27 November to the 28th. Why some sources include Bosque and others omit him is unclear, though it is possibly due to the fact that executive power was transferred to him automatically and not through formal inauguration and he never carried out any acts as president.)

Personal details
- Born: Pedro Agustín Morales Hernández; 11 March 1808 La Paz, Viceroyalty of the Río de la Plata (now Bolivia)
- Died: 27 November 1872 (aged 64) La Paz, Bolivia
- Cause of death: Physical quarrel
- Spouse: Petrona López
- Parent(s): Pedro Morales; Antonia Hernández

Military service
- Allegiance: Bolivia
- Branch/service: Bolivian Army
- Rank: General

Pedro Agustín Morales Hernández (11 March 1808 – 27 November 1872) was a Bolivian military officer who served as the 16th president of Bolivia from 1871 to 1872.

== Early years ==
Morales was born in La Paz. Originally a supporter of President José Ballivián (1841–1847), Morales became a sworn enemy of General Manuel Isidoro Belzu, who had overthrown Ballivián in 1847. A Colonel in 1850, Morales orchestrated an assassination attempt on the life of President Belzu. The assassination attempt failed and Morales was forced to flee the country, heading to Peru and remaining there until the overthrow of Jorge Córdova.

== Career ==
Following many years combatting Belzu, Morales came to power with President José Maria Linares (1857–1861). Opposed to the government of General José Maria de Achá, who had overthrown Linares, Morales supported the 1864 coup that brought to power the notorious General Mariano Melgarejo, who rewarded him with the generalship and (importantly) command of the Bolivian Army. Melgarejo's six-year regime had been controversial and brutal, and opposition to it became widespread. Eventually, General Morales changed sides and, after uniting all the factions fighting against the President, deposed Melgarejo via coup d'état in January, 1871. Defeating the troops of José María Calderón on January 15, the barracks of La Paz were stormed, culminating on Melgarejo's overthrow.

Author Moisés Alcázar describes the jubilant sentiment of the Bolivian people after Melgarejo's overthrow:

Melgarejo's star had definitively died out. Bolivia jubilantly celebrated its liberation, taking in happily the awakening from a terrible nightmare, determined to return to normality, and to reverse the values invested in the dark and mournful times [of Melgarejo's regime] because the world has to regain its balance. In the history of humanity, power is nothing more than frequent alternative. Life is stronger than despotism and errors, and sometimes, gently or painfully, order and progress are restored, without which the existence of peoples would be impossible. Because good is imperative for superior souls, dignifying the human species. The malignant ends by being irretrievably defeated and devastated, although the brutality is supported by force, which is also transitory and variable. And there will be jubilant mornings like that of January 15, 1871, as there will be Melgarejos and crime and barbarism blocks, although only for a short time, the sun of Liberty.

Soon after ousting Melgarejo, Morales reverted the reforms and decrees of the previous regime. However, he was as much a despot as his predecessor, shutting the national congress down in 1872. He continued Melgarejo's ruling style despite his promise of "more liberty and less government".

In terms of economics, Morales advocated for the free export of silver. Also he wanted to boost the industry and trade by attracting foreign investment, which the promoting of foreign investment. The promoting was mostly promoted for the mining sector. Favorable policies for the influx of capital were established, and concessions were granted to foreign companies for the exploitation of mineral resources in the country.

== Controversy and death ==
Morales’ presidency would have a turbulent start, like most Bolivian presidents of that time, facing a naval invasion launched from Valparaíso by melgarejista General Quintín Quevedo. Ruperto Fernández, the Prefect of Cobija, successfully crushed the expedition and Quevedo was forced to flee to Peru.

Of legendarily volcanic temperament, Morales endeavored to rule as a dictator, but was exposed as semi-literate when, in 1872, one of his letters was published in the newspapers by a famous Bolivian writer. Embarrassed, Morales called Congress for the first time since the early Achá administration and declared himself ready to leave office if considered unworthy.

While Congress deliberated, Morales suffered from extremely violent tantrums and mood changes. This led him to physically assault one of his military aides, his nephew Federico Lafaye, in the Government Palace at La Paz on 27 November 1872. The President's nephew, tried to stop him but was struck himself, whereupon Lafaye shot and killed the temperamental President.

Following Morales' death, Congress proclaimed Tomás Frías as temporary President, charged with the task of calling elections in 1873.

== Political views ==
Morales got quoted seen as "A soldier of liberty, a republican at heart, and a man of valor (…)"

Political offices
Preceded by Mariano Melgarejo	President of Bolivia; 1871–1872	Vacant Juan de Dios Bosque; Acting Title next held by Tomás Frías
