= Hilarión Daza =

President of Bolivia (1840–1894)

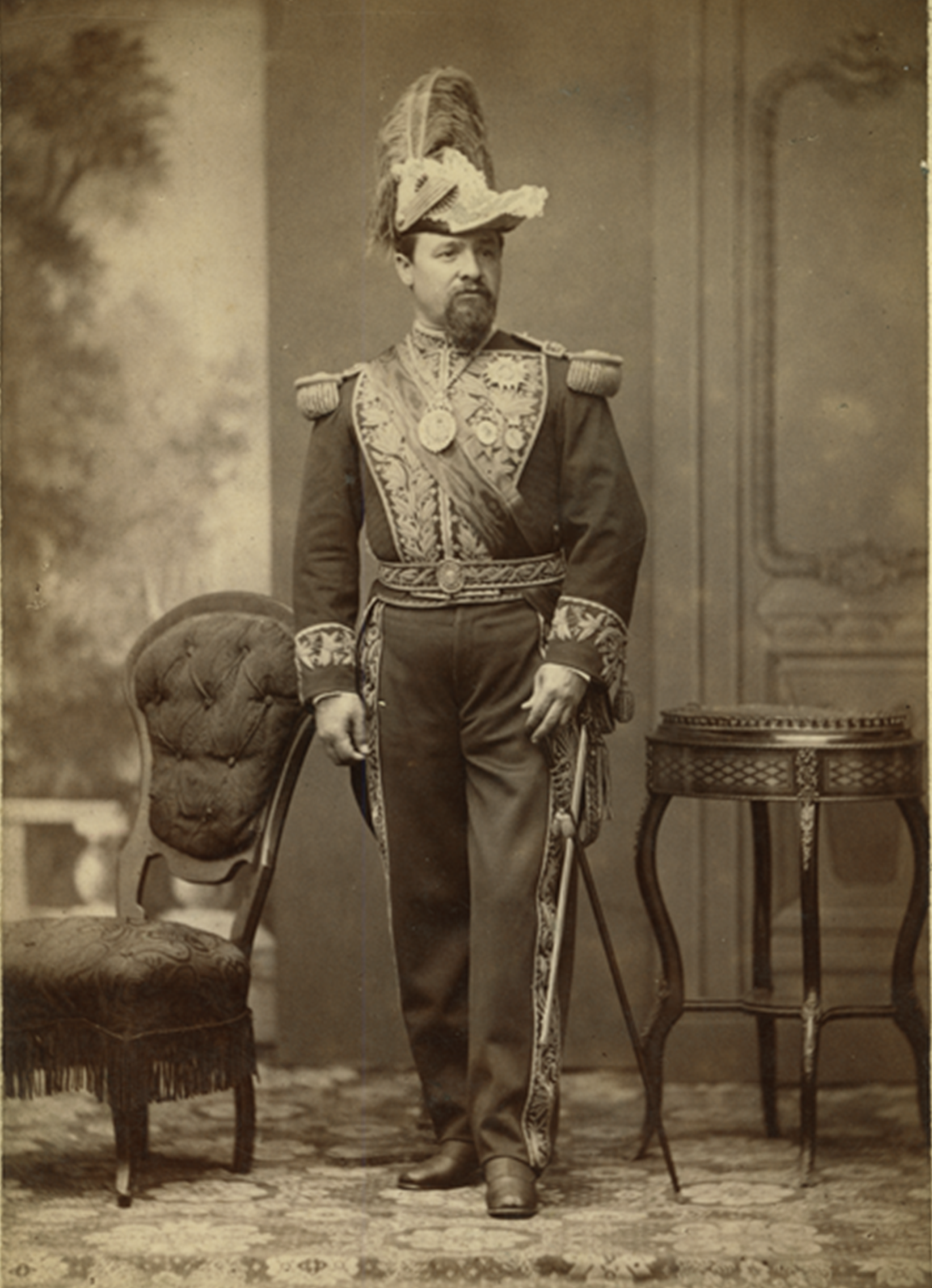

19th President of Bolivia
- Provisional
- In office 4 May 1876 – 28 December 1879
- Preceded by: Tomás Frías
- Succeeded by: Pedro José de Guerra (acting); Uladislao Silva (President of the Junta); Narciso Campero (provisional)

Minister of War
- In office 13 May 1874 – 14 February 1876
- President: Tomás Frías
- Preceded by: Ildefonso Sanjinés
- Succeeded by: Eliodoro Camacho

Personal details
- Born: Hilarión Grosolí Daza; 14 January 1840 Sucre, Bolivia
- Died: 27 February 1894 (aged 54) Uyuni, Bolivia
- Cause of death: Assassination
- Other political affiliations: Affiliated with Militarists, Liberals and Liberal conservatives
- Spouse: Benita Gutiérrez
- Children: Raquel Daza Gutiérrez
- Parent(s): Marcos Grosellé; Juana Daza

Military service
- Branch/service: Bolivian Army
- Rank: General

Hilarión Daza Grosellé (Note: In this Spanish name, the first or paternal surname is Grosellé and the second or maternal family name is Daza.) (né Grosoli Daza; 14 January 1840 – 27 February 1894) was a Bolivian military officer who served as the 19th president of Bolivia from 1876 to 1879.

Born in Sucre, Daza enlisted in the Bolivian Army and rapidly ascended the ranks. He earned the favor of Mariano Melgarejo, who promoted him to commander, but later helped oust him in an 1871 uprising. He served as minister of war in the cabinet of Tomás Frías from 1874 to 1876, but overthrew him in another coup d'état in May 1876.

During his term, Daza settled debts with the Catholic Church and withdrew Bolivia's debased currency from circulation. He contended with the Grande Seca, the century's most severe drought, which had major economic ramifications. In foreign policy, Daza imposed a ten-cent tax per quintal of exported saltpeter, a measure that triggered the War of the Pacific in 1879. Daza personally commanded the Bolivian Army through a series of military disasters, resulting in the nation's defeat and the permanent loss of its coastline to Chile.

Following the war, Daza was stripped of his command and forced to relinquish the presidency. He fled to exile in Europe, and lived in Paris for fourteen years. In 1894, he petitioned to return to Bolivia but upon his arrival was assassinated in Uyuni by the officials charged with his custody. The circumstances of his death remain unresolved.

== Early life ==
=== Early life and family ===
Daza was born in Sucre on 14 January 1840. His father, Marcos Grosellé, was originally from Piedmont—his surname was Grosoli, later transformed into Grosellé—while his mother, Juana Daza, was of mestizo origin. Daza changed his surname to his mother's in order to fit in better into Bolivian society.

Little is known about the lives of Daza’s parents. Most Bolivian historians agree that Daza’s father worked as a saltimbanque in a circus—akin to an acrobat. Historian Roberto Querejazu describes Daza’s father as a "man fond of attracting public attention through displays of his muscular strength".

Daza entered the military at a very young age in the 1850s. Here, he performed well.

=== Military and political career ===
Initially, Daza was a supporter of President Mariano Melgarejo (1864–1871). However, in 1870, he began his political career by revolting against his protector, Melgarejo, betraying him for 10,000 pesos. He rose to prominence under Agustín Morales, under whose government (1871–1872) he assumed command of the famous Colorados Battalion. The Colorados were a unit which were supposed to physically protect the President of Bolivia, essentially serving as bodyguards. However, they were trained soldiers and feared, for they were very well trained and skilled in combat. Thereafter, the Colorados remained loyal to Daza and would help him rise to power.

After the assassination of President Morales in November 1872, he temporarily assumed power, later transferring it to Tomás Frías, who was the legal successor since he was president of the Council of State. Later, he supported the government of Adolfo Ballivián (1873–1874) and when he died, he supported Frías who assumed the presidency after the sudden death of his predecessor. It was under Frías that Daza served as Minister of War.

== Presidency ==
=== Coup against Frías and struggles ===
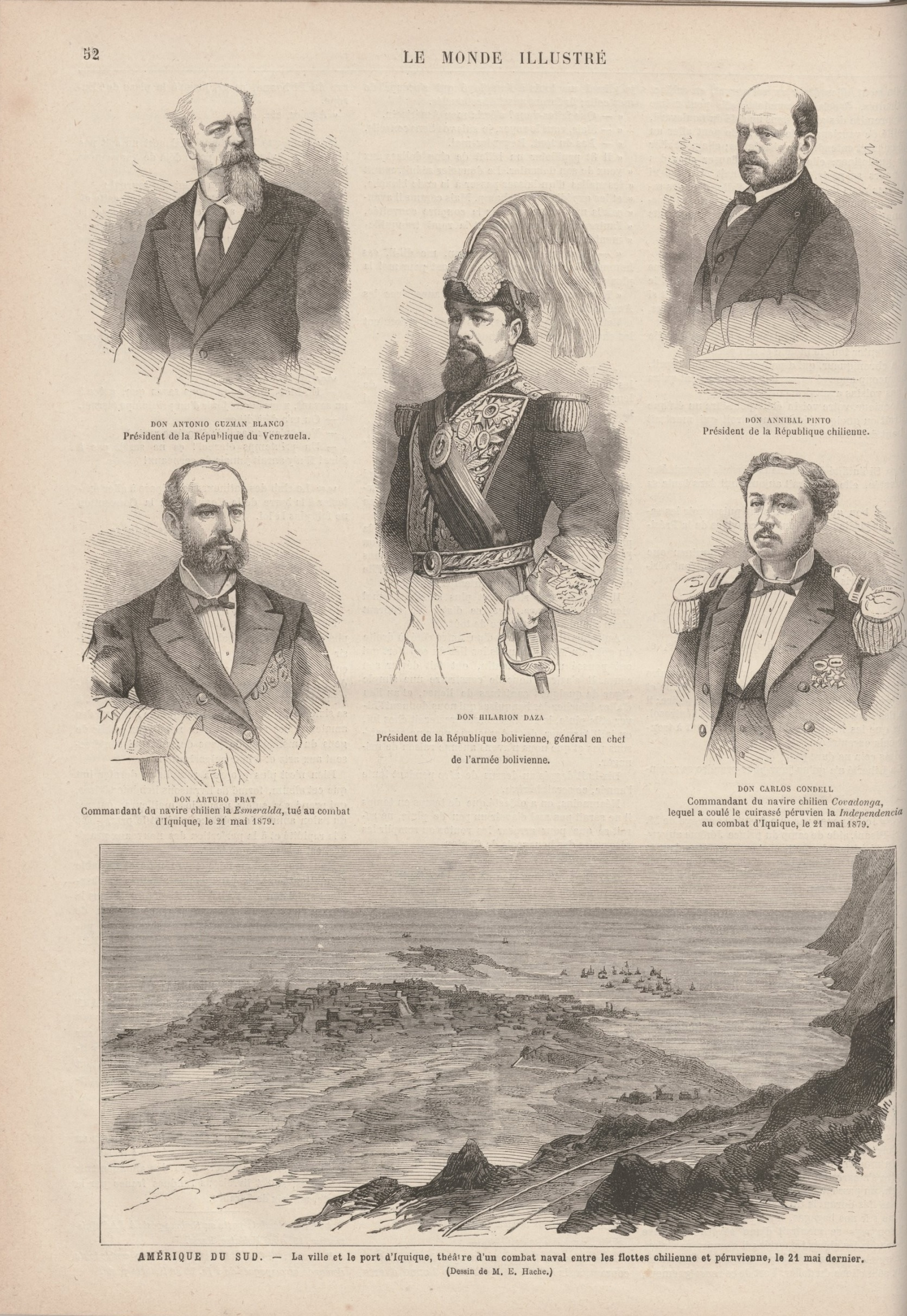
Daza as portrayed by Le Monde illustré, a world news French magazine, during the War of the Pacific.

Once promoted to the rank of army general, in 1876, Daza revolted against President Frías, whom he overthrew, and then dictatorially assumed power. He was confirmed as Provisional President by the Constituent Assembly of 1878, approving by law the acts of his provisional government. With the support of his Colorados Battalion, he imposed his authority, severely repressing the slightest opposition to his government. Daza hoped to gather the support of nationalist Bolivians to strengthen his internal position from insurrections, a massive demonstration by artisans in Sucre, and widespread opposition. He was a militaristic caudilloist.

=== Tension with the Chileans ===
The Atacama desert coast, the disputed territory that sparked the War of the Pacific in 1879.

To a large extent, Daza Groselle entered the Palacio Quemado with a desire to create Bolivian control over the remote, sparsely populated maritime province of Litoral. By the late 1870s, the latter was already settled mostly by Chileans, who found access to the region much easier than did the highland Bolivians. Predictably, a corollary of this growing physical and economic Chilean presence in the region was its irredentist claim by Santiago, especially when rich deposits of guano were discovered near the Bolivian port of Mejillones. In 1878, there was a very strong earthquake in Bolivia followed by a severe drought that caused a famine.

The conflict with Chile had its genesis in the Chilean influence in the territory of the Bolivian coast, whose attraction was in guano and saltpeter. The Compañía de Salitres y Ferrocarril de Antofagasta, a company with Chilean capital, had many prominent political shareholders of that country. Daza, once in power, initiated a completely anti-Chilean policy. Chileans residing in Antofagasta complained of mistreatment by the Bolivian authorities.

==== The treaty with he Compañía de Salitres y Ferrocarril de Antofagasta ====
In 1873, the Bolivian government signed an agreement with the representative of the Compañía de Salitres y Ferrocarril de Antofagasta, an agreement that at the beginning of 1878 was not yet in force, because, according to the Bolivian constitution, contracts on natural resources had to be approved by congress. This was done by the Bolivian National Constituent Assembly through a law, on 14 February 1878, on the condition that a tax of 10 cents per quintal of saltpeter exported by the company be paid.

Retrato de Daza in 1876

For Chile, the collection of the tax of 10 cents per quintal exported explicitly violated article IV of the 1874 Treaty between Bolivia and Chile, which prohibited raising taxes for twenty-five years on "Chilean people, industries and capital working between parallels 23 º and 24º" and residents in that area. Bolivia counterargued that the company was not a "Chilean citizen" nor a resident but a commercial entity, which constituted, according to the laws of Bolivia, as subject, therefore, to its ius imperium. The Chilean owners of the affected company flatly refused to pay said tax, considering it to be abusive, and requested help from the government of Chile. Santiago pledged their support for the company's cause, despite the fact that it was a dispute between a private company and the Bolivian State.

The Chilean government considered it a bilateral case and endorsed the sui generis of the conflict. Thus, began the diplomatic conflict between Bolivia and Chile that escalated rapidly in magnitude given the lack of diplomatic tact of Daza's government. Peru participated as a mediator in the resulting crisis, deciding to send a Special Ambassador and Plenipotentiary to Santiago to try to avoid a possible war through negotiation. The treaty indicated that the controversies that give rise to "the intelligence and execution of the Treaty" should be submitted to arbitration.

==== The occupation of Antofagasta ====
On 17 November 1878, the government of La Paz ordered the prefect of the department of Cobija, Severino Zapata, to enforce the 10-cent tax established by the Law of 14 February 1878 in an attempt to counteract the serious economic crisis in Bolivia. Thus, originating the casus belli. Subsequently, on 1 February 1879, the government of Bolivia unilaterally rescinded the contract, suspending the effects of the law of 14 February 1878, and decided to claim the saltpeter fields occupied by the Compañía de Salitres y Ferrocarriles de Antofagasta. They proceeded to auction the assets of the company in order to collect the unpaid taxes, using armed force in the process. The auction was scheduled for 14 February 1879. Daza ignored the probability of Chilean retaliation. Chile occupied Antofagasta that same 14 February 1879, frustrating the auction. Daza, citing invasion as a casus belli, declared war on Chile. The secret treaty between Peru and Bolivia signed in 1873 in which former pledged to support the latter militarily in case of conflict with Chile. Chile declared war on Bolivia on 5 March 1879, and proceeded to occupy the Bolivian coast, asserting old unresolved territorial claims regarding the coast between those parallels.

=== Economic policies ===
In 1868, Hilarión Daza gained fame in Bolivia for covering the distance from the city of Sucre to La Paz on horseback in just three days. He carried an urgent message regarding a military uprising in the city of Sucre and delivered the news in person to the terrifying, dreadful, and highly feared president of Bolivia, Mariano Melgarejo Valencia (1820–1871)—who, a few days later, promoted Daza in rank. Yet, only three years later, in 1871, Daza would betray Melgarejo.

Hilarión Daza's administration in Bolivia between 1876 and 1879 was marked by series of economic reforms. In the economic sphere, Daza's government implemented a series of measures aimed at boosting Bolivia's industrial and agricultural development. Foreign investment was encouraged, protectionist policies were established to foster domestic production, and the export of products such as tin and rubber was incentivized. In addition, reforms were implemented in the tax system with the aim of increasing state revenue, and the construction of infrastructure such as railways and highways was promoted to facilitate the transport of goods. These measures included the imposition of high taxes. His administration was the implementation of economic reforms that sought to modernize the country. The government of Hilarión Daza, which took place between 1876 and 1879, was marked by a series of economic policies that sought to strengthen and modernize the country. Infrastructure projects were promoted, such as the construction of railways and the promotion of mining. Another important consequence of Daza's administration was the severe economic crisis the country faced. During his tenure, unfavorable economic policies were implemented, such as the issuance of unbacked paper currency and excessive borrowing from foreign countries, which led to severe inflation and an increase in foreign debt. The country's economic situation deteriorated, generating widespread discontent among the population. These included the global economic crisis. Despite this, Daza's government left a legacy of economic development.

== The War of the Pacific ==
=== First phase: The unchallenged occupation of the Bolivian Litoral ===
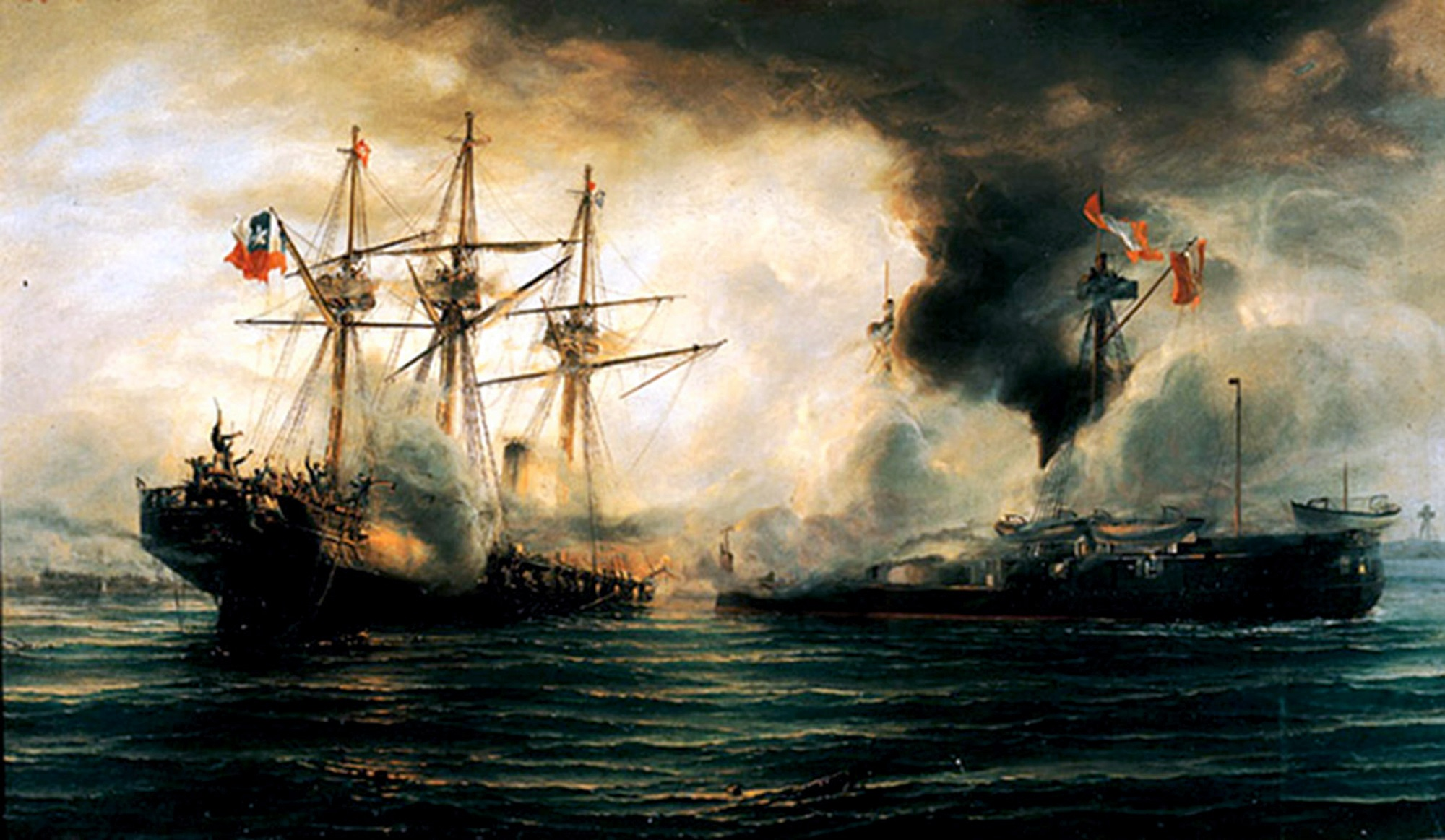
Sinking of the Esmeralda during the Battle of Iquique.

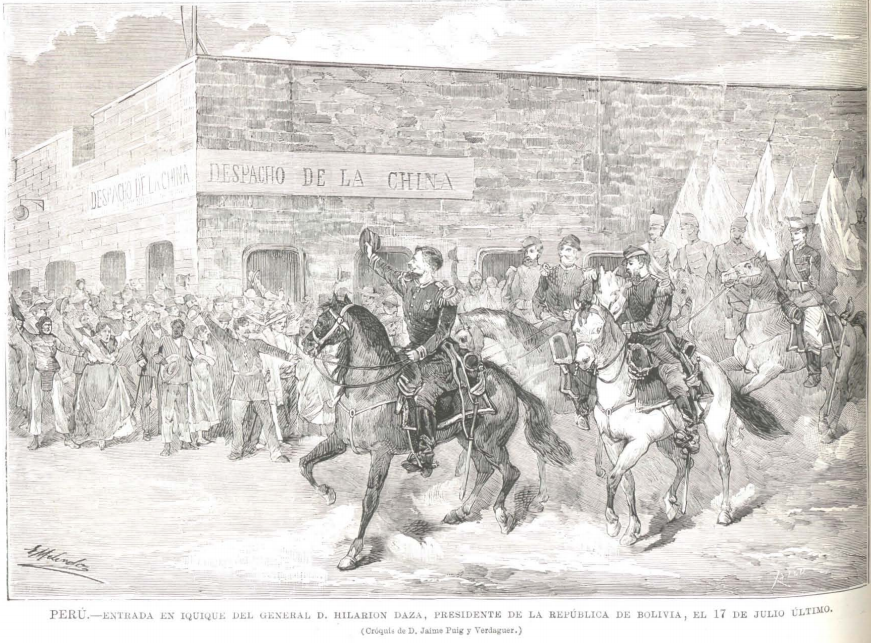
Daza arriving in Iquique, Peru (July 17, 1879)

The entire Bolivian coastline was occupied by Chilean troops, completely unchallenged by the Bolivian Army. A widely spread version of the events of the outbreak of the war affirms that Daza celebrated his birthday when Chile invaded Antofagasta. Coinciding with carnival, it is said that Daza withheld the news of the Chilean invasion so as not to interrupt the festivities. However, this has never been confirmed.

Finally, on 28 February, the news of the Chilean invasion was known in Bolivia. On 1 March, Daza declared the breakdown of communications with Chile and the seizure of the properties of Chilean citizens with the use of force. At the same time, he claimed the support of Peru, in compliance with the Defensive Alliance Treaty signed in 1873.

=== Second phase: Bolivian declaration of war and Peru's entrance ===
The Peruvian government urgently sent a diplomatic envoy to Santiago to mediate in the Chilean-Bolivian conflict. The mission was headed by José Antonio de Lavalle and arrived in Valparaíso on 4 March. However, while these peace negotiations took place, Daza, in an evident attempt to make the negotiations fail and force Peru to join the conflict, declared war on Chile on 14 March.

On 23 March, Bolivian and Chilean forces clashed in the Battle of Calama, with the Chileans taking the victory. Finally, on 5 April, Chile declared war on Peru, after this country refused to remain neutral in the conflict. As the war progressed, the Chileans began slowly pushing the Allied Forces to toward defeat. For this reason, in the midst of the war, Daza secretly negotiated with Chilean agents to separate Bolivia from the conflict and leave Peru to its own devices; In return, Bolivia would receive compensation for the loss of its coastline; the delivery of Tacna and Arica. These negotiations never materialized due to the disapproval of Bolivia's congress.

=== Third phase: Supreme Commander of the Army and downfall ===
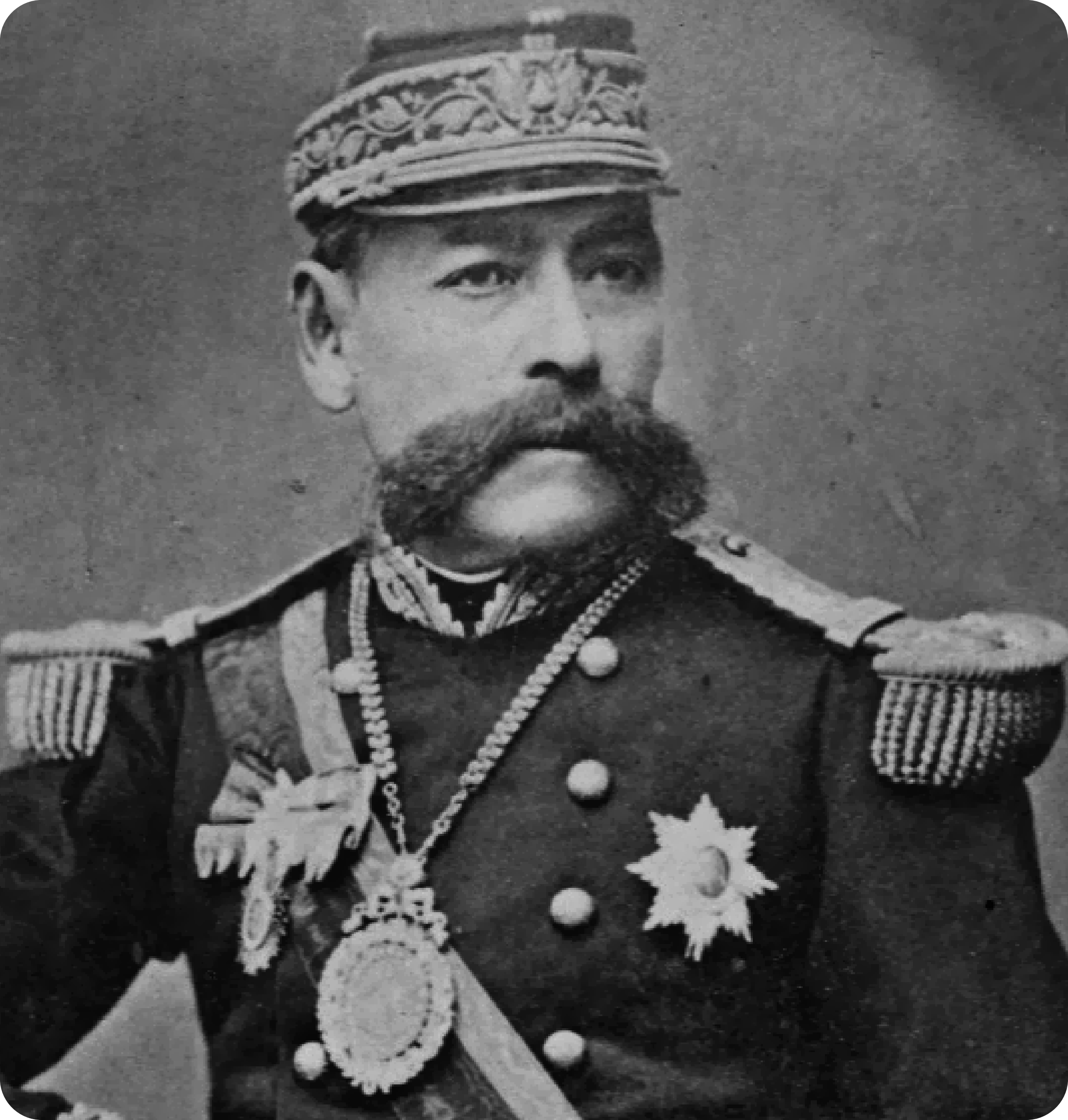
Narcisco Campero united the military and politicians of Bolivia against Daza.

Daza withdrew from the position of head of state by supreme decree on 17 April 1879, in order to personally assume command of the army and march at the head of the Bolivian forces. He led them to Tacna, and after the Chilean landing in Pisagua, he marched south to support the Peruvian Army stationed in Iquique. After staying in Arica briefly, he continued marching. However, after three days of marching along the Camarones ravine, he announced to Peruvian President Mariano Ignacio Prado that his troops refused to continue due to the harsh conditions of the desert, opting to return to Arica. Daza's telegram to Prado on 16 November read, "Desert overwhelms, army refuses to move forward," verbatim. This decision affected the direction of the war, leaving Peru virtually alone in the conflict. Luis L. Schenoni cites this episode as an example of how contingent, chance-driven events - rather than pre-existing structural conditions — could decisively shape the outcomes of nineteenth-century Latin American wars.

Meanwhile, the Peruvian army stationed in the port of Iquique under the command of General Juan Buendía, decided to advance inland. Buendía trusted the arrival of Daza's forces to break the Chilean lines. But the news of Daza's retreat had a tremendous demoralizing effect on the Peruvian troops, who suffered a serious defeat in San Francisco on 19 November. Daza returned to Arica, where he learned of his dismissal as President of Bolivia on 28 December after to a coup d'état was staged by the military amid enormous discontent among the population over the direction of the war. He then moved to Arequipa, where he waited for his family to join him; This done, he left for Europe. Armed with considerable financial resources, having left with a portion of Bolivia's treasury, he settled in Paris, France. In Bolivia, General Narciso Campero replaced Daza after playing a crucial role in the latter's ouster. A Junta was then established under the presidency of Uladislao Silva, which governed the country until the election of Campero as provisional president.

== Later life and death ==
=== Return to Bolivia and assassination ===
After fifteen years in France, in 1893, Daza requested permission from the then Bolivian president, Mariano Baptista, to return to his country in order to defend himself against the accusations made by his enemies in the Legislative Congress. In 1894, Daza arrived at the port of Antofagasta (former Bolivian territory) from where he headed to Uyuni with the hope of reaching the city of La Paz. However, he was assassinated by his guards upon his arrival at the Uyuni railway station.

=== A legacy of speculations ===
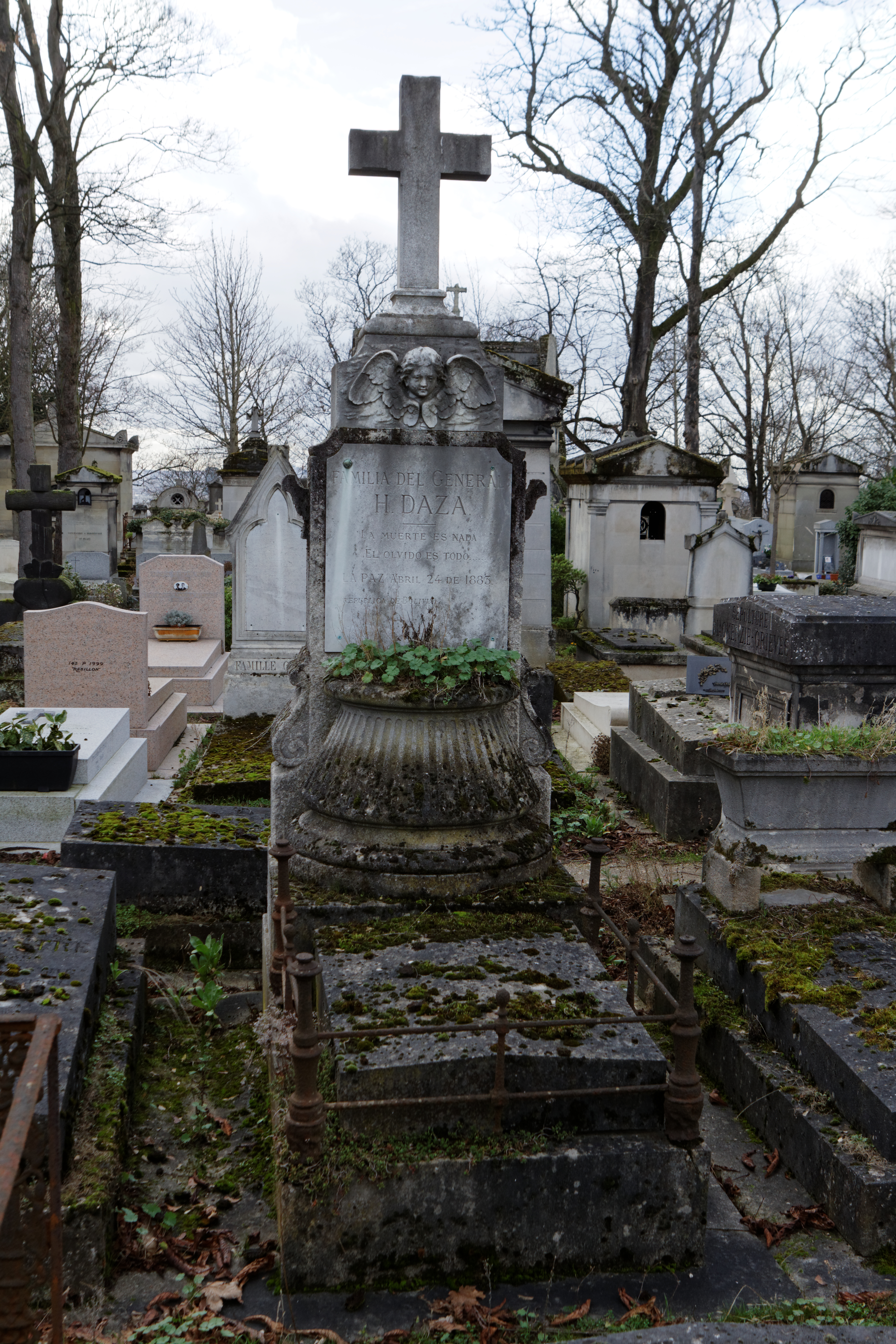
Hilarión Daza's family at Père Lachaise Cemetery in Paris.

Since the beginning of the 21st century, there has been a rising vindication movement for Daza, seeking to explain his murder with all kinds of speculation about the revelations (against Narciso Campero and others) that he was supposed to make in the Bolivian Congress. Authors such as José Mesa, Teresa Gisbert and Carlos Mesa Gisbert consider that Narciso Campero did not order the entry into action of his forces in Atacama in the second half of 1879 because he was in collusion with the mining businessmen headed by Aniceto Arce, who they had commercial interests in partnership with Chilean investors on the Pacific coast, occupied by Chile after the military actions of March 1879. However, nothing has ever been proven.

== Personal life ==
He married in La Paz, on 12 October 1872, with the distinguished lady Doña Benita Gutiérrez. Acting as witnesses to the marriage were Agustín Morales and Casimiro Corral, who was Minister of Foreign Affairs of Bolivia at the time. From this marriage, Doña Raquel Daza y Gutiérrez was born.

== See also ==
- War of the Pacific
- Eduardo Abaroa
- Ladislao Cabrera
- Narciso Campero
- Genoveva Ríos
- Ignacia Zeballos Taborga
- Italian Bolivians

== Bibliography ==
- Mesa José de; Gisbert, Teresa; and Carlos D. Mesa, "Historia de Bolivia", 3rd edition.

Political offices
Preceded by Mariano Ballivián	Minister of War; 1874–1876	Succeeded by Eliodoro Camacho
Preceded by Tomás Frías	President of Bolivia; Provisional; 1876–1879	Vacant Title next held by Narciso Campero; Provisional
