= Manuel Isidoro Belzu =

President of Bolivia from 1848 to 1855

- Portrait by Antonio Villavicencio, Museo de Charcas, Sucre

11th President of Bolivia
- In office 6 December 1848 – 15 August 1855 (Note: In dissidence since 12 October 1848.); Provisional: 6 December 1848 – 15 August 1850
- Preceded by: José Miguel de Velasco (provisional)
- Succeeded by: Jorge Córdova

Minister of War
- In office 4 February 1848 – 4 October 1848
- President: José Miguel de Velasco
- Preceded by: Eusebio Guilarte
- Succeeded by: Felipe Álvarez

Personal details
- Born: Manuel Isidoro Belzu Humerez; 14 April 1808 La Paz, Viceroyalty of the Río de la Plata, Spanish Empire (now Bolivia)
- Died: 23 March 1865 (aged 56) La Paz, Bolivia
- Cause of death: Assassination
- Spouse: Juana Manuela Gorriti
- Children: 2

Military service
- Allegiance: Republic of Bolivia
- Rank: Army General
- Battles/wars: Spanish American wars of independence; Battle of Zepita; Battle of Ayacucho; War of the Confederation; Battle of Socabaya; Battle of Yanacocha; Peruvian-Bolivian War of 1841-1842; Battle of Ingavi

Manuel Isidoro Belzu Humérez (4 April 1808 – 27 March 1865) was a Bolivian military officer and statesman who served as the 11th president of Bolivia from 1848 to 1855. Under his presidency, the current national anthem and flag of Bolivia were adopted.

He came to power in 1848 after defeating incumbent president José Miguel de Velasco's forces in the Battle of Yamparaez. He defeated two insurrections in 1849, a third in 1853 and a fourth in 1854. He retired from the presidency in 1855 and was succeeded by his son-in-law, General Jorge Córdova. Córdova was overthrown in 1857 and assassinated in 1861. Belzu led two unsuccessful rebellions against the new government in 1862 and 1864–1865 before being killed in 1865.

== Early life and education ==
Belzu was born in La Paz to mestizo parents Gaspar Belzu and Manuela Humérez. He was educated as a youth by Franciscan friars. However, Belzu admired the heroes of the Spanish American wars of independence such as Simón Bolívar and José de San Martín and hoped to emulate them. For this reason, he decided to join Army of Liberation when he was fifteen, in hopes to join the fight against the Spanish in his homeland of Upper Peru. He joined the wars of independence, fighting under Andrés de Santa Cruz at Zepita (1823). After serving as an aide-de-camp to Agustín Gamarra, he left the Peruvian army when the latter entered Bolivia in 1828.

== Marriage and family ==
Assigned as garrison commander to Tarija, where Francisco Burdett O'Connor was military governor at the time, Belzu married "up" by wedding a beautiful and intellectual Argentine lady, Juana Manuela Gorriti, who resided there with her family. General O'Connor would be one of the witnesses to the wedding and would later be a supporter of Belzu. They had two daughters, Edelmira and Mercedes. Edelmira would later marry General Jorge Córdova, who became Belzu's successor.

== Military career and plots ==
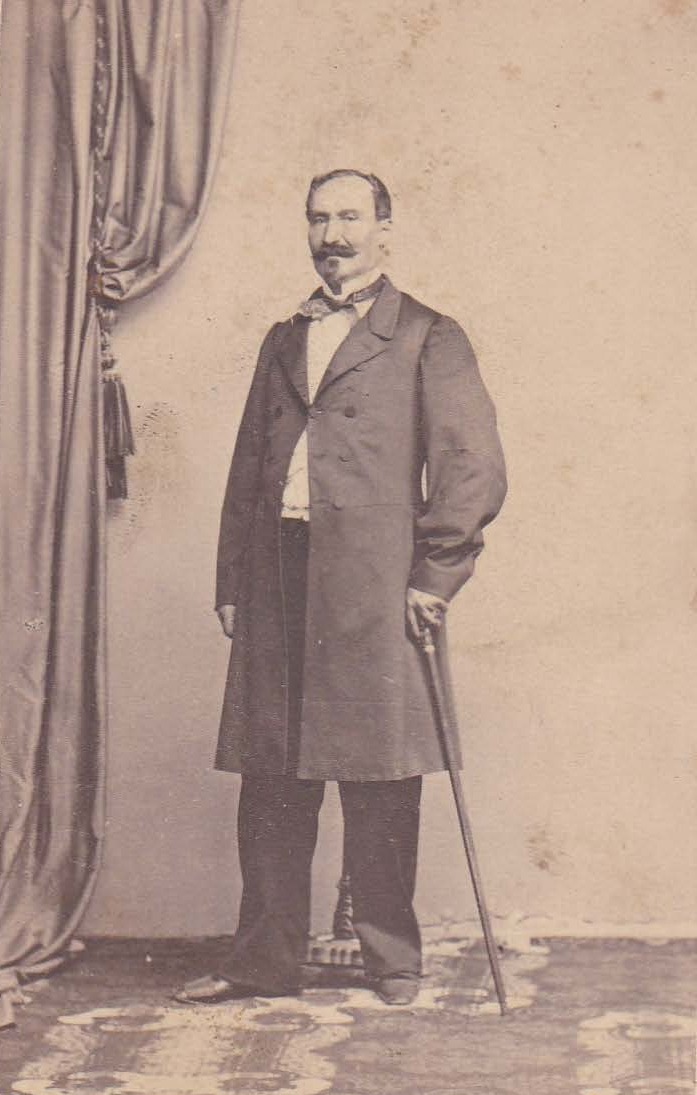
Belzu in 1848.

Belzu fought in the battles of the Peru-Bolivian Confederacy, during which he was promoted to the post of Army commander by President José Ballivián. He had fought bravely under his orders at the Battle of Ingavi (1841).

Originally a close friend and supporter of President Ballivián, Belzu turned against him about 1845. Ballivián had reportedly attempted to seduce Belzu's wife in his own Oruro home. Surprising the President there, Belzu shot at him and barely missed. The event sealed an undying enmity between the two that would never abate. Political ambitions—typical of upper-level Bolivian military officers at the time—may have played a role in addition to the personal reasons. Belzu decided at that point to try to topple the "Hero of Ingavi" from the presidency. Withdrawing to the countryside (orders for his arrest for the attempted murder of the President had been issued), Belzu never ceased to conspire against his former friend.

=== Ideology and rise to power ===
Belzu's political stance became more populist as he embraced his mestizo heritage, railed against the power of the "white" oligarchy, and vowed to advance the cause of the poor and the Indian should he come to the presidency. In his travels as a fugitive, Belzu had seen the deplorable conditions under which most of the population lived, with scarcely any improvements or public works by the government. His position established a strong base of support among the peasants, who came to know him as "Tata (Father, or Protector) Belzu."

Another, more conventional anti-Ballivián insurgent group was commanded by the ambitious former president, José Miguel de Velasco. As a warlord, he led his army in competition with that of Belzu in the race to topple the President. The embattled Ballivián found the country ungovernable, and in December 1847 he fled to exile abroad. He left the government in the hands of General Eusebio Guilarte, head of the Council of State and legally second-in-line to the presidency.

At this point Belzu made a pact with Velasco to support the latter's accession to the Presidency while Belzu took the position of Minister of War. Belzu quickly betrayed Velasco and had his troops proclaim him as president. A bloody counter-coup by General Velasco had to be put down, with Belzu commanding the troops that crushed Velasco's. By the end of the year, Belzu had destroyed the opposition (both Ballivián and Velasco) and consolidated his power as the sole de facto president of Bolivia.

== President of Bolivia ==
As promised, Belzu led his government in undertaking populist measures, but he also wanted to maintain strong control over power. Most of Belzu's reforms were cosmetic, although his political statements were more liberal than any president's had been since Sucre. During his seven-year presidency Belzu attempted to modernize the country through division of wealth and by rewarding poor workers. Belzu also defended the small, indigenous producers by implementing protectionist economic policies as well as enacting a nationalist mining code that kept the nations resources in the hands of Bolivian companies, which in turn provoked many influential British as well as Peruvian and Chilean shipping and mining companies. Belzu also promoted communal state-sponsored social welfare projects that resonated with local Indians, since communalism was more representative of indigenous values than private property.

As a result of Belzu's appeal to the country's poor and indigenous groups, he had gained a number of powerful enemies who would want to destroy the state-run projects he created though at the same time gained large support and power. capitalizing on his relative popularity, Belzu managed to legitimize his rule by becoming democratically elected. He faced constant opposition and rebellions from the pro-Ballivián camp, from ambitious fellow military warlords, and later, from the pro-Linares faction that coalesced as a united front against military caudillism. Belzu's protectionist economic policies were opposed by Great Britain and the United States, and isolated Bolivia from the global economy and ongoing intellectual trends. Although popular with the masses due to his statist policies (contrary to prevailing notions), Belzu never lacked enemies among the powerful, whose interests he threatened. He barely survived a well-planned assassination attempt in Sucre, carried out by Agustin Morales, then an obscure mid-ranking officer but one who would later become president.

Lieut. Lardner Gibbon, US Navy, while exploring the valley of the Amazon, met with President Belzu in Bolivia and wrote the following account:

"Upon inquiring how the President came by some wounds in his face, I was told that in September, 1850, Belzu was invited to take a walk in the alameda [market] of Sucre. A friend persuaded him to continue on outside the usual promenade, where they met some persons riding on horseback, upon the report of whose pistols Belzu fell, three balls having entered his head. The ruffians escaped from the country; the friend was shot in the plaza of the capitol (sp) before Belzu was well enough to interfere in his behalf. The plan was well laid, and so sure were the intended murderers that his days were ended, they rode off, leaving him on the ground, shouting “viva Ballivián,” an ex-president, who at that time was known to be lingering along the boundary line between Bolivia and the Argentine republic. This attempt to assassinate Belzu made him the more popular. The country is taught that his escape was Providential, and he had been spared for the good of the people." (Ch.5, p.135)

== Retirement and the presidency of General Córdova ==
By the early 1850s, Belzu dispensed with any pretense of democratic norms and ruled despotically. After seven years, a weary Belzu decided to announce his retirement in front of the National Congress of 1855, which was presided that year by Mariano José Calvo. He ran elections in which he sponsored the candidacy of his loyal son-in-law, General Jorge Córdova. The latter was duly elected over José María Linares (perhaps with the help of at least some degree of official fraud), and for two years ruled Bolivia as a virtual proxy of the powerful former president. During this time, Belzu served as his country's plenipotentiary in Europe.

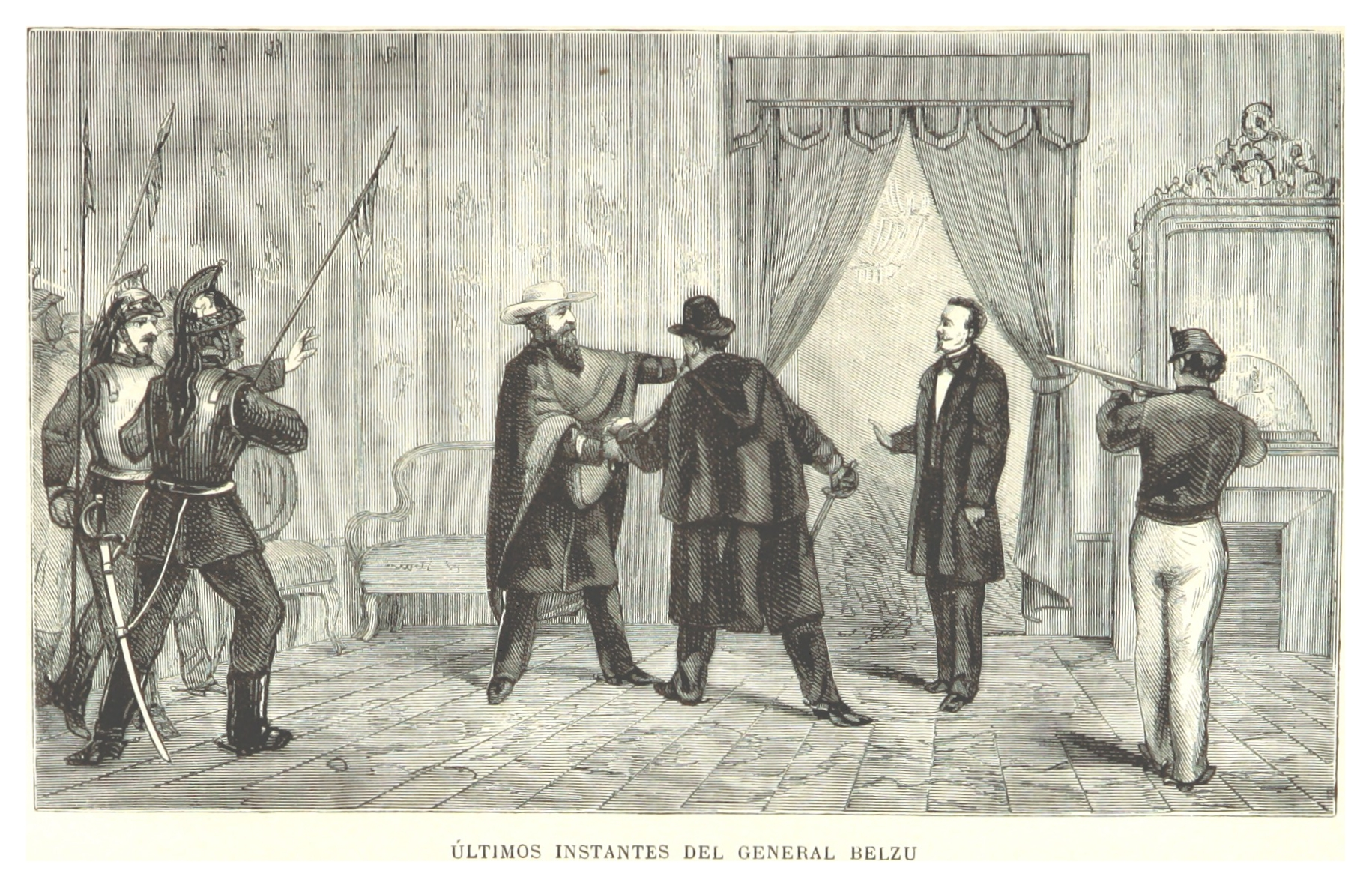
The assassination of Manuel Isidoro Belzu at the hands of Mariano Melgarejo.

In 1857, Córdova was overthrown in a coup d'état. Ambrosio Peñailillo was defeated by Linares' partisans, causing the surrender of the belcista army. Still acting as Belzu's proxy, he was murdered after being caught plotting against President José María de Achá in 1862. This galvanized Belzu despite his age; he returned to Bolivia and raised an army, with the hope of returning to the presidency and avenging the death of his son-in-law.

=== The Constitutionalist Uprising of 1865–1865 ===
Even after Belzu had been eliminated, Melgarejo still faced widespread discontent from several sector of society and would face nearly a year of rebellions by a collective group called "Constitutionalists". Having seized power only in December 1864, less than a month later Melgarejo clashed with rebel forces in Tacaquira, located in the southern area of the Chuquisaca Department, on January 24, 1865. The rebels would win this encounter, facing government troops again in a bigger battle on the banks of the Oscara River on February 3 and ultimately retreating.

== Exile and assassination ==
To Melgarejo's dismay, Belzu who was exiled in Europe, returned to Bolivia to dispute the rise of Melgarejo, sparking a full civil war. On March 22, 1865, Belzu's army defeated the government forces in La Paz with the help of the popular masses. On March 27, Melgarejo and Quintín Quevedo attacked La Paz with his army but was defeated, with several of his men choosing to side with Belzu.

However, as soon as Belzu entered the Palacio Quemado for the meeting, Melgarejo and his men murdered him. New investigations have come up with the theory that since Melgarejo's revolver failed (the seller found out that only 1 bullet came out of 5 shots), then the bullet that killed Belzu came from the revolver of some soldier who was behind him.

According to legend, when Melgarejo's presence was known, a crowd gathered in the Plaza Murillo, located in front of the Bolivian Government Palace, cheering Belzu's name. However, Melgarejo appeared on a balcony instead and announced, "Belzu is dead. Who lives now?" and the crowd shouted: "Long live Melgarejo!"

== Political views ==
Belzu rejected private property and supported egalitarianism and conservatism. His political views have been seen as Utopian socialist, similar to those of Proudhon, Saint-Simon and Lamennais.

== Sources ==
- Mesa José de; Gisbert, Teresa; and Carlos D. Mesa, Historia De Bolivia, 5th edition.

Political offices
Vacant Title last held by Eusebio Guilarte	Minister of War; 1848	Succeeded by Felipe Álvarez
Preceded by José Miguel de Velasco; Provisional	President of Bolivia; 1848–1855	Succeeded by Jorge Córdova
