= José María de Achá =

14th President of Bolivia

- Portrait by Antonio Villavicencio, Museo de Charcas, Sucre

14th President of Bolivia
- In office 4 May 1861 – 28 December 1864; Provisional: 4 May 1861 – 15 August 1862; Junta: 14 January 1861 – 4 May 1861
- Preceded by: José María Linares (provisional)
- Succeeded by: Mariano Melgarejo (provisional)

Minister of War
- In office 5 October 1858 – 14 January 1861
- President: José María Linares
- Preceded by: Lorenzo Velasco Flor
- Succeeded by: Pedro Cueto

Personal details
- Born: José María de Achá Valiente; 8 July 1810 Cochabamba, Viceroyalty of the Río de la Plata (now Bolivia)
- Died: 29 January 1868 (aged 57) Cochabamba, Bolivia
- Spouse(s): Gertrudis Antezana; Filomena Guzmán
- Parent(s): Agapito de Achá; Ana María Valiente
- Nickname: Yellow Leg

Military service
- Allegiance: Bolivia
- Branch/service: Bolivian Army
- Rank: General
- Battles/wars: War of the Confederation; Peruvian-Bolivian War; Battle of Ingavi

José María de Achá Valiente (8 July 1810 – 29 January 1868) was a Bolivian general who served as the 14th president of Bolivia from 1861 to 1864. He served in the battles of the Peru-Bolivian Confederation and conspired against longtime dictator Manuel Isidoro Belzu (1848–55). Later, he was appointed Minister of War in the cabinet of another dictator, José María Linares (1857–61). In that capacity, he led the 1861 coup d'état that toppled Linares. Originally he governed as head of Junta, and then as sole leader of the revolutionary government but became constitutional president via elections. He was himself overthrown in the 1864 military coup carried out by General Mariano Melgarejo.

== Early military and political activity ==
De Achá was born in the city of Cochabamba on 8 July 1810. He enlisted in the Bolivian army, since a military career was promising at the time. He took part in the War of the Confederation and in the Peru-Bolivia War in 1841. He also fought in the Battle of Ingavi under the command of José Ballivián.

During his political life, de Achá became Minister of War during the presidency of José María Linares, whom he overthrew on 14 January 1861, by means of a coup d'état. After the ousting, a military triumvirate was installed with himself as a member of it. Generals Ruperto Fernández and Manuel Antonio Sánchez were his co-conspirators and fellow triumvirate members. The mission of this triumvirate was to accelerate the process of democratization of the country, convening a constituent assembly. This was installed on 1 May 1861, and on 4 May, the assembly members elected de Achá as provisional President of Bolivia.

== President of Bolivia ==
As soon as he entered the Palacio Quemado, de Achá declared a general amnesty on 6 May 1861, for all the politically persecuted who were outside the republic, in addition to cutting off the legal proceedings against them.

=== Salary increase for ministers and deputies ===
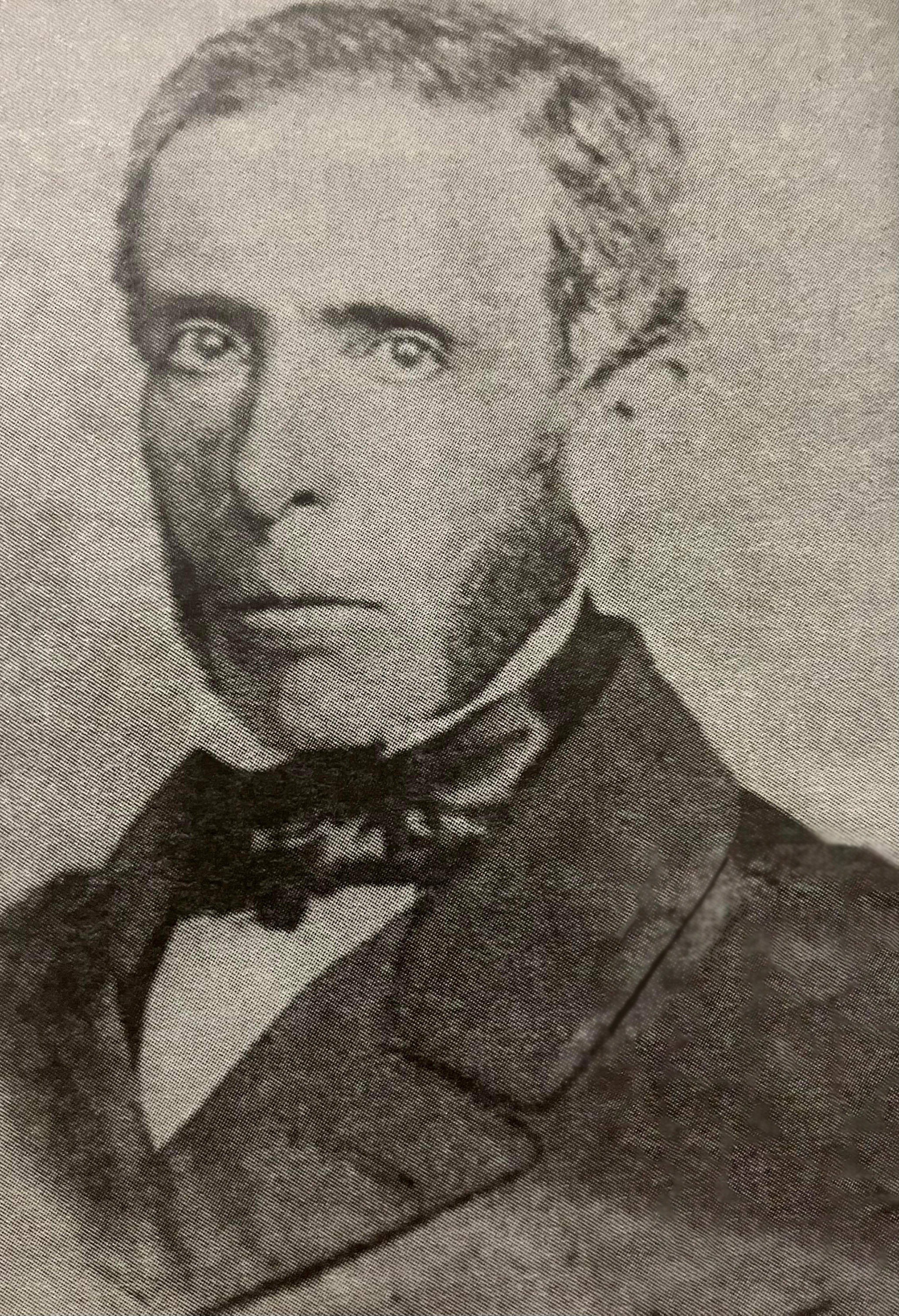
Linares, the unpopular dictator deposed in 1861.

In addition to appointing democratically minded ministers, de Achá raised their salaries to 5,000 pesos per year (416 pesos per month) the same year former president José María Linares had lowered their salaries, by means of the supreme decree of 11 December 1857.

On 23 May 1861, de Acha also decreed the delivery of per diems and allowances (economic remuneration) to the deputies of the assembly in the amount of about 200 pesos per month that the departmental treasuries should pay.

Through the Law of 3 July, a law for the construction of two bridges in the Province of Arque was promulgated: one on the Ucuchi River, and the other on the Colcha River, under the immediate inspection and surveillance of the Municipal Council of the Province. On 10 July of the same year, in the Department of Tarija and District of Chichas, the recruitment of soldiers for Army service was suspended for a period of ten years, except in the case of foreign war, in addition to pardoning soldiers who had deserted.

On 13 July, authorization was decreed to create a commission to repatriate to Bolivia the remains of General and former President José Ballivián, which were still in Rio de Janeiro, Brazil. The commission had already returned the remains of the former president to Bolivia by 4 February 1862. Through the Law of 15 July, the town of Cotagaita was declared the capital of the province of Chichas.

On 5 August 1861, a new Political Constitution was promulgated that established a presidential term of 3 years, without the possibility of re-election.

=== Loreto Massacre ===
In September 1861, de Achá had to travel urgently to Sucre to put down an uprising against the government that had taken place in that city.

De Achá, before leaving La Paz, left Dr. Rudencindo Carbajal as prefect of the department and Colonel Plácido Yáñez as general commander of the department, in charge of maintaining order during the absence of the president.

Placido Yáñez seriously loathed all the belcistas (supporters of Manuel Isidoro Belzu) that still littered the city. Yáñez had been imprisoned and persecuted politically for nie years during the Belzu regime (1848-1855). During the government of Cordova, (1855-1857), this continued and was later exiled.

On 29 September 1861, Yáñez ordered the arrest of several prominent belcistas of La Paz, arguing that they were plotting a coup against the current government. That night, he sent correspondence to President de Achá explaining to him about the arrest of several alleged coup plotters who went against the administration.

When the government in Potosí was informed of what had happened, on 5 October 1861, it ordered that all the detainees, soldiers and civilians, be tried by an ordinary war council and decreed a state of siege in the provinces of Pacajes and Ingavi and in the district of La Paz.

On 18 October 1861, Yáñez ordered the arrest of former president Jorge Córdova, at his house located in the San Jorge neighborhood of the city of La Paz. The soldiers in charge of arresting him transferred Córdova to the Loreto prison (currently where the Legislative Palace of Bolivia is located).

=== Bloodbath ===
On the night of 23 October 1861, there was an alleged mutiny with shots fired in front of the government palace, allegedly by supporters of General Manuel Isidoro Belzu protesting the captivity of the prisoners. Said mutiny was mounted and promoted by the men of Colonel Yáñez in a ploy to frame the prisoners at Loreto and, therefore, justify their deaths.

After this alleged armed uprising against the government, Yáñez ordered the prison guards to assassinate Jorge Córdova with four shots from a firearm in retaliation and punishment. Minutes later, Yáñez received the report from the sentinels that the entrusted mission had already been completed and that he had not been shot six instead of four times. Thus ended the life of former president Córdova, the son-in-law and staunchest supporter of Belzu.

Between 2:00 and 4:00 in the morning, Yáñez and his personal guard, including the sentinel soldiers of Loreto, hurriedly took all the prisoners out of their cells, taking them to the middle of the Plaza Murillo, and shot them. At present, the number of victims is still unknown, but it is generally presumed that more than seventy alleged belcistas died during the Yáñez Bloodbath.

Among those killed was Francisco Belzú, brother of former President Manuel Isidoro Belzu. In addition to the deaths of Jorge Córdova and Francisco Belzú, several notable personalities in the country were also assassinated that same night.

Once President José María de Achá found out about what had happened, he remained impassive and neutral without carrying out any punishment against Plácido Yáñez. In turn, the people of La Paz, seeing the impunity on the part of the government and irritated by such a crime, took advantage of one of the military uprisings against the government to lynch Plácido Yáñez a month later, on 23 November 1861. Unable to appoint a new Commander-General of La Paz due to the uprising, Achá eventually appointed General Dámaso Bilbao la Vieja in January 1862.

== Elections and constitutional presidency ==
He called for elections in 1862, and became constitutional president after defeating General Gregorio Pérez and Dr. Tomas Frías. De Achá took office as constitutional president of Bolivia on 6 August 1862.

=== Decrees and policies ===
In 1863, he published a supreme decree that provided landless indigenous people with a parcel as long as they had owned the land ten years earlier. He also created the Supreme Court of Justice in the city of Cochabamba, a city that was also endowed with its first printing press. He tried to implement reforms in mining and agrarian legislation, but without optimal results.

In foreign policy, he signed the Treaty of Peace and Friendship with Peru of 5 November 1863, which ironed out the differences that both Republics had maintained since the Batlle of Ingavi. At the same time, a pact of defensive alliance was also agreed. It was signed by Minister Plenipotentiary to Peru Juan de la Cruz Benavente, the Bolivian countersignatory, and the Peruvian Foreign Minister, Juan Antonio Ribeyro.

The greatest international problem faced by the de Achá government was the one with Chile. The tension between the two countries had started due to the occupation, by Chile, of the Mejillones Bay, in the Litoral department. Several years had passed since the Chileans had initiated a brazen expansionist policy on Bolivian territory (Atacama), whose riches in guano and saltpeter they coveted. All diplomatic means were exhausted to reach a solution that would satisfy Bolivia, and the Bolivian congress authorized the president to declare war on Chile as a last resort in case all diplomatic resources were exhausted (5 June 1863). But the continental defense against the aggression of the Spanish Pacific fleet in 1864 left this problem in the background, and Bolivia joined the quadruple alliance against Spain, along with Peru, Chile and Ecuador.

Aware of the Chilean threat, he arranged a loan with Great Britain to build a railway to the coast and buy warships to defend the coastline. The processing of this project was entrusted to the industrialist Avelino Aramayo; but when everything was ready, he was frustrated by the refusal of the finance minister, Miguel María de Aguirre. Thus the opportunity was lost for Bolivia to effectively defend its coastal province from Chilean expansionism.

In terms of economics he advocated for open trade. Also his government also promoted the development of the mining industry in Bolivia. Favorable policies were established to attract foreign investment in the mining sector. His economic policies could be explained with that he wanted a liberal government.

=== Melgarejo's coup ===
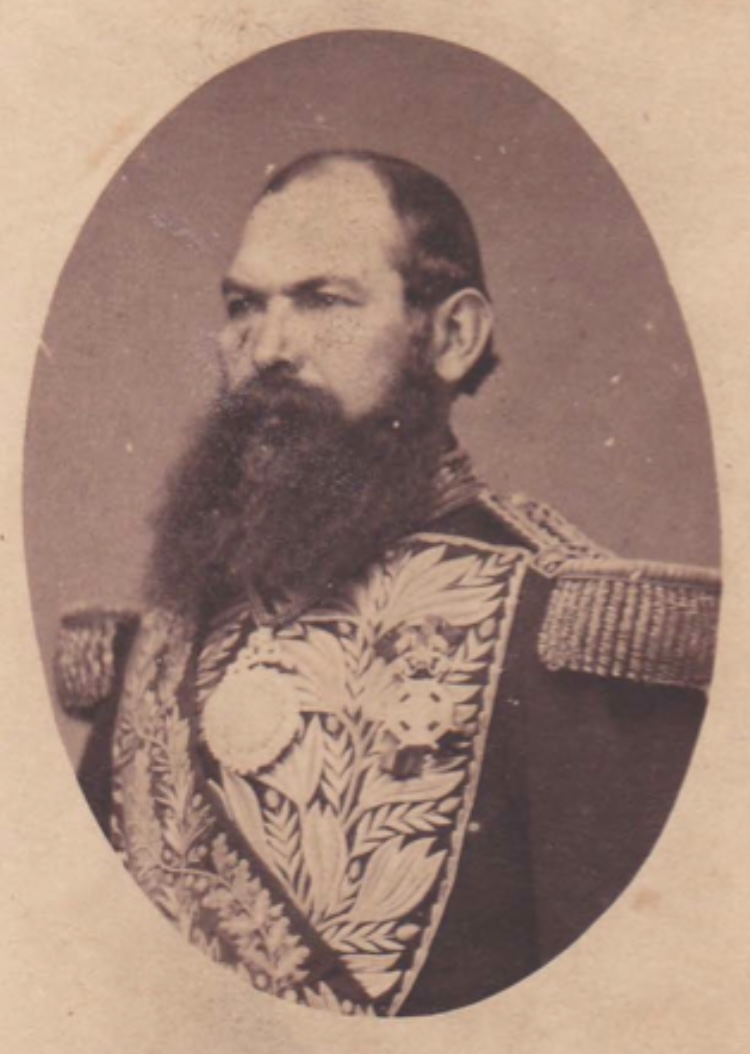
Mariano Melgarejo.

Despite his military talent and leadership skills, de Achá was unable to successfully confront the uprising of his former collaborator and protégé, Mariano Melgarejo, who overthrew him on 28 December 1864.

=== Death and legacy ===
At first, de Achá had been quite popular by virtue of having ended the hated Linares dictatorship. He extended a political amnesty, and legitimized his rule by winning the 1862 elections. Soon, however, he was plagued by rebellions, the bane of any Bolivian president during this chaotic period. At that point, de Achá invoked a state of emergency and began to suppress civil liberties. In particular, he became unpopular as a result of the 1862 "Matanzas de Loreto" or "Matanzas de Yáñez" (Yáñez Bloodbath), when his ally, Plácido Yáñez, the military governor of the La Paz Province, massacred dozens of opposition figures Among those murdered was former president Jorge Córdova. Eventually, discontent became widespread, and de Achá found it difficult to govern at all. Indeed, parts of the party were controlled by different caudillos and military warlords. The president was finally overthrown in an 1864 coup d'état led by General Mariano Melgarejo, who would go on to become the most ruthless and brutal dictator of 19th-century Bolivia.

After a couple of years in exile, the broken and unpopular de Achá returned to Bolivia, where his safety was guaranteed by the now consolidated regime of General Melgarejo. Confined to his home city of Cochabamba, the ailing former president died there in 1868, less than 4 years after being overthrown. He was 57 years old.

Political offices
Preceded by Lorenzo Velasco Flor	Minister of War; 1858–1861	Vacant Title next held by Pedro Cueto
Vacant Government Junta Title last held by José María Linares; Provisional	President of Bolivia; 1861–1864	Succeeded by Mariano Melgarejo; Provisional
