= Cabinet of Adolfo Ballivián =

Bolivian presidential administration and ministerial cabinet from 1873 to 1874

Cabinet of Adolfo Ballivián Ballivián Cabinet
- 34th Cabinet of the Republic of Bolivia
- 1873–1874
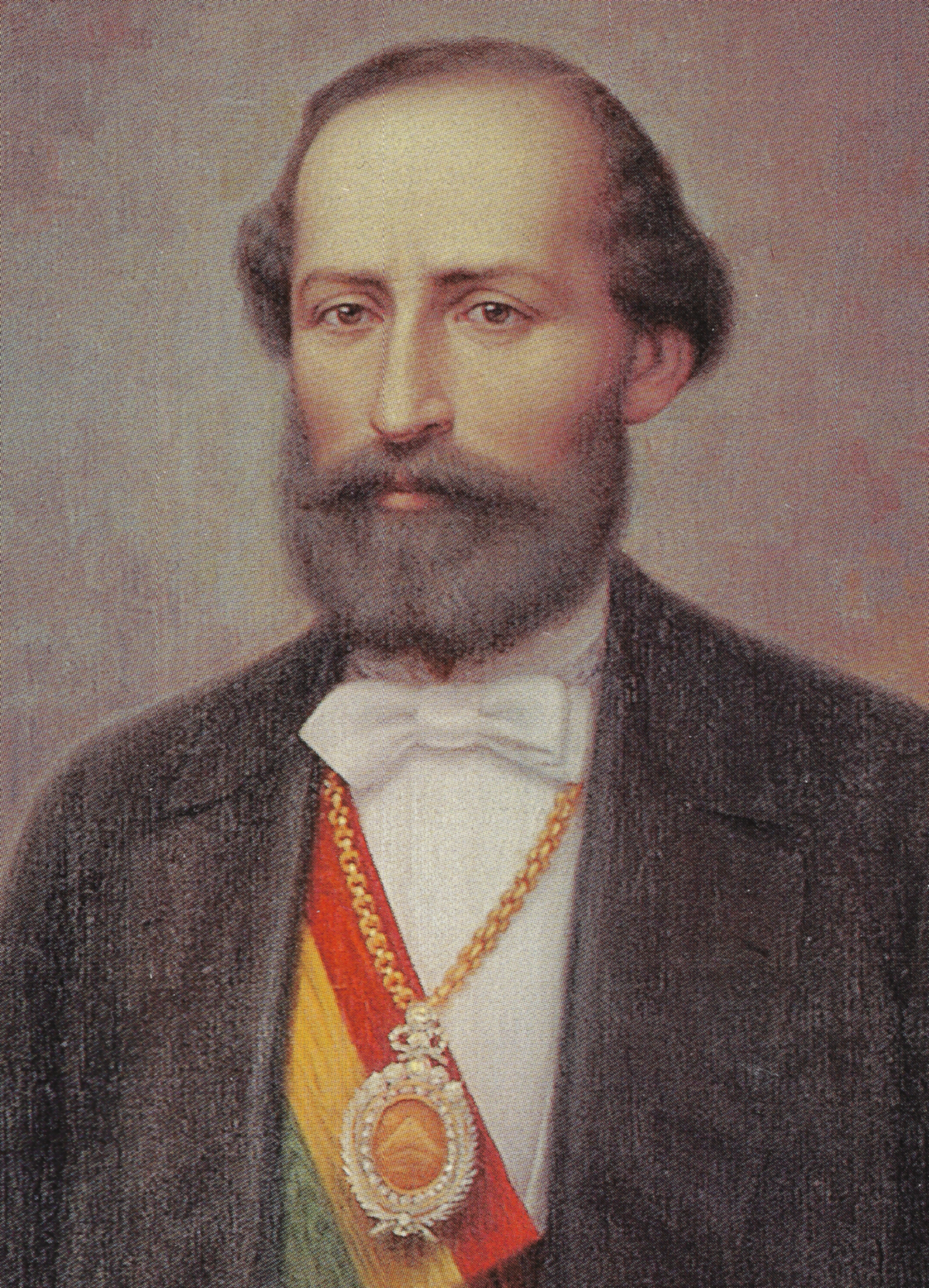
- Date formed: 9 May 1873
- Date dissolved: 14 February 1874 (9 months and 5 days)

People and organisations
- President: Adolfo Ballivián
- No. of ministers: 4
- Total no. of members: 6 (incl. former members)

History
- Election: 1873 general election
- Predecessor: Cabinet of Tomás Frías I
- Successor: Cabinet of Tomás Frías II

The Ballivián Cabinet constituted the 34th cabinet of the Republic of Bolivia. It was formed on 9 May 1873 after Adolfo Ballivián was sworn in as the 18th president of Bolivia following the 1873 general election, succeeding the First Frías Cabinet. It was dissolved on 14 February 1874 upon Ballivián's death and was succeeded by the Cabinet of Tomás Frías II.

== Composition ==
Portfolio	Minister	Party	Prof.	Took office	Left office	Term	Ref.
President	Adolfo Ballivián	PR (Note: The Red Party, which was the origin of the Conservative and Liberal parties, was the faction which presented Ballivián in the 1873 election. Prior to 1880, groups such as the Reds did not yet possess a programmatic and ideological structure that would allow them to be defined as proper political parties.)	Mil.	9 May 1873	31 January 1874	267	
President	Tomás Frías (Note: As President of the Council of State.)	Ind.	Law.	31 January 1874	14 February 1874	14	(Note: President N° 17 (twice president).) (Note: Acting due to the illness of Adolfo Ballivián and upon his death governs as constitutional president.)
Minister of Government and Foreign Affairs	Mariano Baptista	PC	Law.	9 May 1873	4 May 1876	1,091	(Note: President N° 23; First Vice President N° 06 (Pacheco).) (Note: Ballivián + Frías.)
Minister of War	Mariano Ballivián	Mil.	Mil.	9 May 1873	16 January 1874	252	
Minister of War	Ildefonso Sanjinés	Mil.	Mil.	16 January 1874	13 May 1874	369	
Minister of Finance and Industry	Rafael Bustillo	Ind.	Law.	9 May 1873	12 August 1873	95	
Minister of Finance and Industry	Mariano Baptista (Note: As Minister of Government.)	PC	Law.	12 August 1873	27 September 1873	46	
Minister of Finance and Industry	Pantaleón Dalence	Ind.	Mag.	27 September 1873	11 January 1875	471	
Minister of Justice, Public; Instruction, and Worship	Daniel Calvo	PC	Law.	9 May 1873	4 May 1876	1,091	

== History ==
=== Cabinets ===
N°	Formed	Days	Decree
I	9 May 1873	281	Supreme Decree 09-05-1873
