= Cabinet of Tomás Frías =

Cabinet of Tomás Frías is the name of either of two cabinets in the Republic of Bolivia led by Tomás Frías:

- Cabinet of Tomás Frías I (1872–1873)
- Cabinet of Tomás Frías II (1874–1876)
