= Cabinet of Tomás Frías II =

Bolivian presidential administration and ministerial cabinet from 1874 to 1876

Cabinet of Tomás Frías Frías II Cabinet
- 35th Cabinet of the Republic of Bolivia
- 1874–1876
- Date formed: 14 February 1874
- Date dissolved: 4 May 1876 (2 years, 2 months, 2 weeks and 6 days)

People and organisations
- President: Tomás Frías
- No. of ministers: 4
- Total no. of members: 6 (incl. former members)
- Member party: Constitutional Party

History
- Predecessor: Cabinet of Adolfo Ballivián
- Successor: Cabinet of Hilarión Daza

The Frías II Cabinet constituted the 35th cabinet of the Republic of Bolivia. It was formed on 14 February 1874 after Tomás Frías was sworn in as the 17th president of Bolivia following the death of Adolfo Ballivián, succeeding the Ballivián Cabinet. It was dissolved on 4 May 1876 upon Frías' overthrow in a coup d'état and was succeeded by the Cabinet of Hilarión Daza.

== Composition ==
Portfolio	Minister	Party	Prof.	Took office	Left office	Term	Ref.
President	Tomás Frías	Ind.	Law.	14 February 1874	4 May 1876	810	
Minister of Government and Foreign Affairs	Mariano Baptista	PC	Law.	9 May 1873	4 May 1876	1,091	(Note: President N° 23; First Vice President N° 06 (Pacheco); Ballivián + Frías.)
Minister of War	Ildefonso Sanjinés	Mil.	Mil.	16 January 1874	13 May 1874	369	(Note: Ballivián + Frías.)
Minister of War	Hilarión Daza	Mil.	Mil.	13 May 1874	14 February 1876	642	(Note: President N° 19.)
Minister of War	Rudesindo Carvajal (Note: As Minister of Economy; acting for Eliodoro Camacho who never took office.)	Ind.	Law.	14 February 1876	29 March 1876	44	
Minister of War	Agustín Aspiazu	Ind.	Wri.	29 March 1876	4 May 1876	36	
Minister of Finance and Industry	Pantaleón Dalence	Ind.	Mag.	27 September 1873	11 January 1875	471	
Minister of Finance and Industry	Daniel Calvo (Note: As Minister of Justice.)	PC	Law.	11 January 1875	9 April 1875	88	
Minister of Finance and Industry	Rudesindo Carvajal	Ind.	Law.	9 April 1875	4 May 1876	391	
Minister of Justice, Public; Instruction, and Worship	Daniel Calvo	PC	Law.	9 May 1873	4 May 1876	1,091	

== History ==
=== Cabinet ===
N°	Formed	Days	Decree
II	14 February 1874	810	Supreme Decree 14-02-1874
