= Cabinet of Agustín Morales =

Bolivian presidential administration and ministerial cabinet from 1871 to 1872

Cabinet of Agustín Morales Morales Cabinet
- 31st–32nd Cabinet of the Republic of Bolivia
- 1871–1873
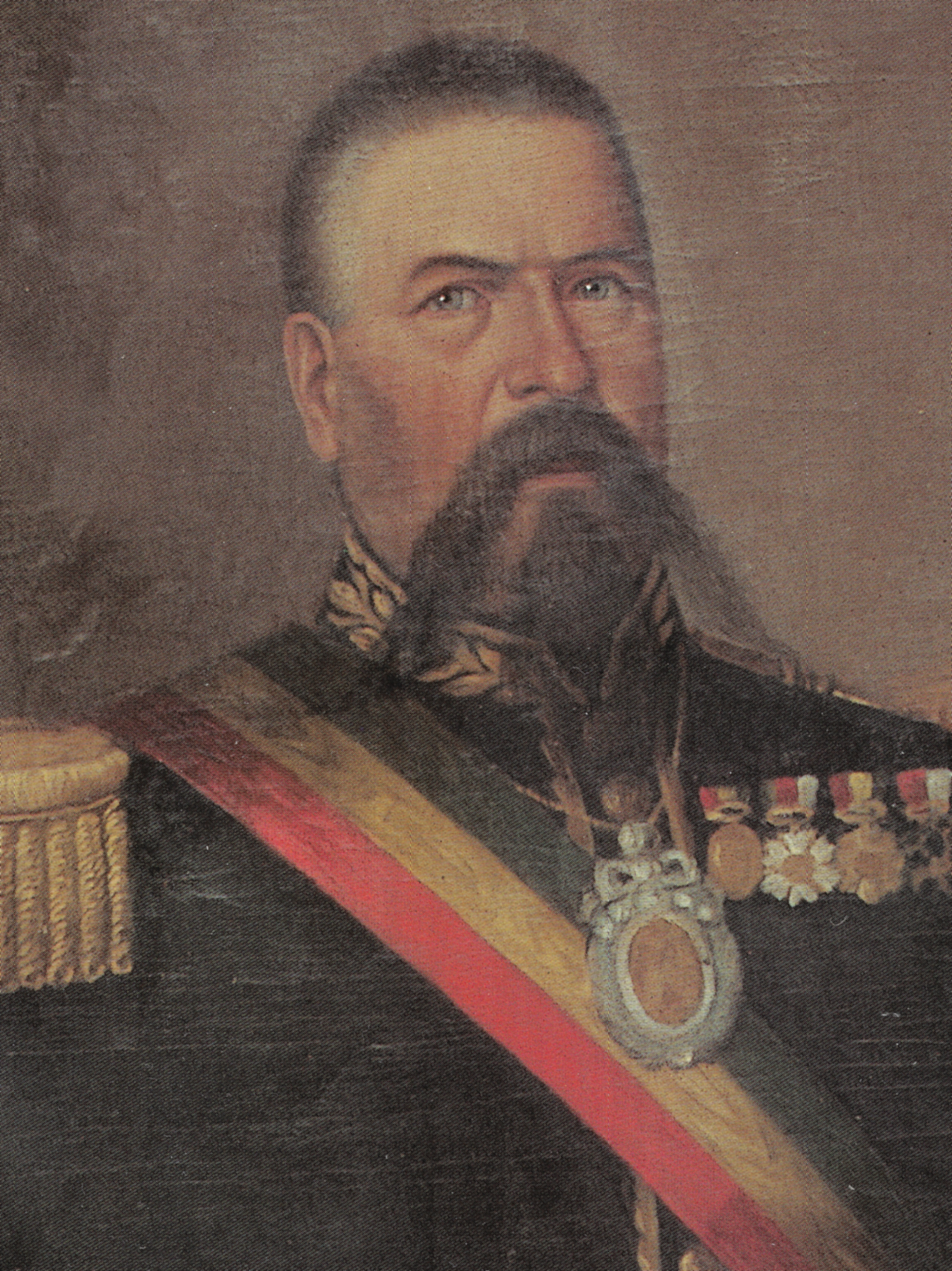
- Date formed: 22 June 1871
- Date dissolved: 27 November 1872 (1 year, 5 months and 5 days)

People and organisations
- President: Agustín Morales
- No. of ministers: 4
- Total no. of members: 8 (incl. former members)

History
- Predecessor: Cabinet of Mariano Melgarejo
- Successor: First Cabinet of Tomás Frías

The Morales Cabinet constituted the 31st to 32nd cabinets of the Republic of Bolivia. It was formed on 22 June 1871 after Agustín Morales took power in a coup d'état, succeeding the Melgarejo cabinet. It was dissolved on 27 November 1872 when Morales was assassinated. All Ministers of State were ratified in their positions by the new cabinet formed by Morales' successor Tomás Frías.

== Composition ==
| Portfolio | Minister | Party | Prof. | Took office | Left office | Term | Ref. |
|---|---|---|---|---|---|---|---|
| President | Agustín Morales | Mil. | Mil. | 15 January 1871 | 25 August 1872 | 682 | (Note: In dissidence since 26 November 1870.) |
| President | Agustín Morales | Mil. | Mil. | 25 August 1872 | 27 November 1872 | 682 | |
| Secretary General (Note: Exerts command of all ministerial portfolios while the respective ministries are organized.) | Casimiro Corral | Ind. | Law. | 15 January 1871 | 22 June 1871 | 743 | |
| Minister of Government and Foreign Affairs | Casimiro Corral | Ind. | Law. | 22 June 1871 | 27 January 1873 | 743 | (Note: Morales + Frías.) |
| Minister of War | Narciso Campero | Mil. | Mil. | 22 June 1871 | 22 October 1871 | 122 | (Note: President N° 20.) |
| Minister of War | Ildefonso Sanjinés | Mil. | Mil. | 22 October 1871 | 9 May 1873 | 565 | |
| Minister of Finance | Tomás Frías | Ind. | Law. | 22 June 1871 | 12 September 1871 | 82 | (Note: President N° 17 (twice president).) |
| Minister of Finance | Casimiro Corral | Ind. | Law. | 12 September 1871 | 22 October 1871 | 40 | |
| Minister of Finance and Industry | Pedro García | Ind. | Law. | 22 October 1871 | 9 May 1873 | 565 | |
| Minister of Justice and Worship | Lucas Mendoza de la Tapia | Ind. | Mag. | 22 June 1871 | 12 September 1871 | 82 | |
| Minister of Justice and Worship | Casimiro Corral | Ind. | Law. | 12 September 1871 | 22 October 1871 | 40 | |
| Minister of Justice, Public; Instruction, and Worship | Melchor Terrazas | Ind. | Law. | 22 October 1871 | 27 January 1873 | 463 | |
| Minister of Public Instruction and Industry | Mariano Réyes Cardona | Ind. | – | 22 June 1871 | 12 September 1871 | 82 | |
| Minister of Public Instruction and Industry | Casimiro Corral | Ind. | Law. | 12 September 1871 | 22 October 1871 | 40 | |
| Minister of Public Instruction and Industry | Office merged with the Ministry of Justice | | | | | | |

== History ==
Upon his assumption to office, Morales charges all ministerial portfolios to Casimiro Corral as secretary general pending the formation of a proper ministerial cabinet. A full council of ministers was appointed on 22 June 1871, 5 months into his mandate, composed of five ministers. In this cabinet, the Ministry of Industry, formed by the government of Mariano Melgarejo in 1869, was abolished. Its portfolios were reassigned to the Ministry of Public Instruction and to an entirely new department, the Ministry of Justice.

A new cabinet was formed on 22 October 1871. With it, the number of ministries was reduced from five to four with the Ministry of Public Instruction being merged into the Ministry of Justice and the industry portfolio becoming annex of the Ministry of Finance. Morales was assassinated on 27 November 1871 and was succeeded the following day by Tomás Frías. Under Frías, this cabinet remained intact for the majority of his term before finally being reformed on 27 January 1873.

=== Cabinets ===
| N° | Formed | Days | Decree |
|---|---|---|---|
| I | 22 June 1871 | 122 | Supreme Decree 22-06-1871 |
| II | 22 October 1871 | 56,036 | Supreme Decree 22-10-1871 |

=== Structural changes ===
| Portfolio | Part of | Transferred to | Date | Decree |
|---|---|---|---|---|
| Industry | Ministry of Industry | Ministry of Public Instruction | 22 June 1871 | Supreme Decree 22-06-1871 |
| Worship | Ministry of Industry | Ministry of Justice | 22 June 1871 | Supreme Decree 22-06-1871 |
| Justice | Ministry of Public Instruction | Ministry of Justice | 22 June 1871 | Supreme Decree 22-06-1871 |
| Instruction | Ministry of Public Instruction | Ministry of Justice | 22 October 1871 | Supreme Decree 22-10-1871 |
| Industry | Ministry of Public Instruction | Ministry of Finance | 22 October 1871 | Supreme Decree 22-10-1871 |
