= José del Corral Calvo =

José del Corral Calvo de la Banda
- Born: February 20, 1625; Lima, Viceroyalty of Perú
- Died: March 5, 1686; Lima, Viceroyalty of Perú
- Education: University of Salamanca
- Spouse(s): Beatriz de Haro y Sotomayor; Francisca Antonia de la Torre y Zegarra
- Children: 10
- Parent(s): Alonso Pérez del Corral; Bernardina Calvo de Escobar y la Banda

José del Corral Calvo de la Banda (20 February 1625 – 5 March 1686) was a jurist educated at the Colegio Real y Mayor de San Martín in Lima and at the University of Salamanca, where he obtained a doctoral degree and taught law. Throughout his career he served as fiscal and oidor in the Royal Audiences of Charcas and Lima, positions he held until his death in poverty despite his long service in the imperial judicial administration.

== Biography ==
He was the son of Captain Alonso Pérez del Corral and Bernardina Calvo de Escobar y de la Banda. In 1643 he entered the Colegio de San Martín in Lima and later became a collegian at the Colegio de San Felipe in the same city. He subsequently moved to the University of Salamanca, where he taught Instituta and Código and obtained his doctoral degree. He traveled to Spain in 1653, and his presence in Madrid is documented in 1655.

He was appointed oidor of the Royal Audiencia of Santa Fe by consultation of 3 August 1654; however, shortly thereafter he was designated fiscal of the Royal Audiencia of Charcas by consultation of 16 October 1654 and royal title of 14 March 1655. He later rose to the position of oidor of the same audiencia by consultation of 2 March and title of 18 June 1657.

On 9 April 1658 he obtained a license to travel to his post. In 1672 he was accused of having married in violation of royal prohibitions. On 1 June 1676 he was appointed fiscal of the Royal Audiencia of Lima, and on May 20, 1679 he was promoted to oidor of the same tribunal. He died while holding this office in such poverty that alms had to be collected to pay for his funeral.

== Family ==
He first married Beatriz de Sotomayor y Haro on 25 June 1659 at the Sagrario of Lima. She was the daughter of Pedro de Sotomayor y Haro, knight of the Order of Santiago, and Luisa de Córdoba y Figueroa. Beatriz’s sister, Luisa de Sotomayor, married Alonso de Zárate y Verdugo, alcalde del crimen of the Audiencia of Lima. They had one daughter called Francisca.

After the death of his first wife, Corral married Francisca Antonia de la Torre y Zegarra in November 1664 in Sorata, Larecaja. She was a native of Arequipa and the daughter of General Juan de la Torre y Cárdenas, corregidor of Larecaja, and Leonor Zegarra y Valverde. Through her father, she was a descendant of Juan de la Torre, the founder of Arequipa. They had the following children: José Francisco, Juan, Vicente, Rosa, Francisco, María Teresa, Bernardo, Bernarda and Pedro. His youngest son, Pedro Calvo del Corral, married Josefa de Antequera y Henríquez Cellorigo, with whom he had issue, including Juan de Dios Calvo de la Banda y Antequera.

After his death in 1686, his wife, Francisca Antonia de la Torre, was left an impoverished widow with nine children. The Crown therefore granted her an encomienda for two lives and a stipend of 6,000 pesos for her support. This concession was made in recognition of her noble lineage, as she belonged to the “first nobility of Arequipa” and was a descendant of Juan de la Torre.
