= Daniel Calvo =

Bolivian writer and lawyer (1832–1880)

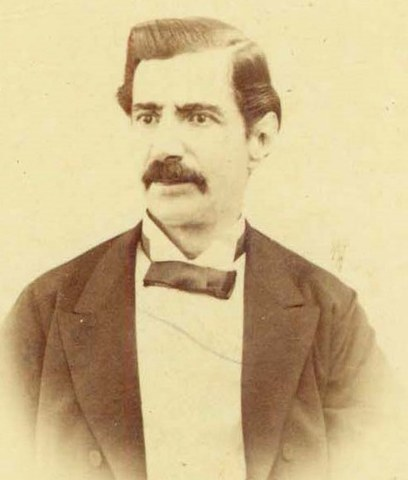

Minister of Justice, Public Instruction, and Worship
- In office 9 May 1873 – 4 May 1876
- President: Adolfo Ballivián; Tomás Frías
- Preceded by: Juan de Dios Bosque
- Succeeded by: José Manuel del Carpio

Personal details
- Born: Tomás Daniel Calvo Gómez; 18 September 1832 Sucre, Chuquisaca, Bolivia
- Died: 16 June 1880 La Paz, Bolivia
- Party: Constitutional Party
- Spouse: Elisa de la Torre Cabero
- Parent(s): Mariano José Calvo Cuéllar; María Josefa Gómez Martínez
- Education: University of Saint Francis Xavier

Daniel Calvo Gómez (18 September 1832 – 16 June 1880) was a Bolivian lawyer, journalist, poet, and politician. He was Minister of Justice, Public Instruction, and Worship between 1873 and 1876. Later, he served as President of the National Convention in 1880.

== Biography ==
He was born in the city of Sucre on 18 September 1832, and was baptized the same day in the Church of Santo Domingo. His godparents were Atanasio de Urioste and his wife, Micaela Gómez Martínez, the child's maternal aunt. He was the son of the lawyer Mariano José Calvo Cuéllar and María Josefa Gómez Martínez. He was therefore the grandson of Juan de Dios Calvo y Antequera and the nephew of President Mariano Enrique Calvo.

He pursued his studies at the University of San Francisco Xavier of Chuquisaca, graduating as a lawyer in 1856. Calvo is recorded as having supported the insurrection led in Potosí in 1854 by Colonel José María de Achá against the administration of General Manuel Isidoro Belzu. The uprising ended with the defeat of the rebel forces at Sutimarca by General Jorge Córdova. Following the establishment of the September dictatorship of José María Linares, Calvo was appointed to a ministerial office as Head of Section in the Department of Justice, and was later named Rector of the Colegio Junín in Sucre. During this period, he edited the Boletín Oficial and El Siglo. He also took part in the 1864 revolution against the government of Mariano Melgarejo, serving as general secretary during the campaign. After the defeat of the revolution, Calvo was exiled.

He published poetic compositions in newspapers and literary journals of the time, and also worked as editor for El Porvenir, El Siglo, La Causa de Septiembre, and other periodicals. He served on several occasions as a national representative, and during the governments of Adolfo Ballivián and Tomás Frías, he held the office of Minister of Justice, Public Instruction, and Worship from 1873 to 1876. He was one of the most prominent parliamentarians of the Convention of 1880.

He died in La Paz on 16 June 1880, while serving as President of the National Convention.

== Family ==
Daniel Calvo married Elisa de la Torre Cabero, a lady from Cinti, on 20 April 1856, in the Church of San Lázaro in Sucre. Elisa was the daughter of Pedro Antonio de la Torre y Luna Pizarro and Francisca Cabero de la Canal. Their children were Eduardo, Daniel, Adolfo, Mariano, Saturnino, Elisa, Aníbal, Benjamín, and Laura Calvo de la Torre.
