= Juan de Dios Calvo =

Juan de Dios Calvo y Antequera
- Born: Juan de Dios Calvo de la Banda y Antequera; February 19, 1734; Andahuaylillas, Cusco, Viceroyalty of Perú
- Died: December 6, 1801; La Plata, Viceroyalty of Río de la Plata
- Citizenship: Spanish
- Education: University of San Francisco Xavier
- Spouse: Rosa de Cuéllar y Gómez
- Children: 6
- Parent(s): Pedro Calvo de la Torre y del Corral; Josefa de Antequera y Seleorigo
- Relatives: Marcelo Claure; Gonzalo Sánchez de Lozada; Mariano Enrique Calvo

Juan de Dios Calvo de la Banda y Antequera (19 February 1734 – 6 December 1801) was a colonial jurist of Cusco origin, educated at the Seminary of San Antonio Abad and at the University of San Francisco Xavier of La Plata, where he earned his doctorate in 1762. Coming from a family with extensive representation in the audiencias, he was appointed oidor of the Audiencia of Charcas in 1777, a position he held until his death. His career reflected the Crown’s official rehabilitation of the figure of his uncle José Miguel Antequera. Among his descendants are Gonzalo Sánchez de Lozada Sánchez Bustamante and Marcelo Claure Bedoya.

== Biography ==
Born in Andahuaylillas, Cusco to Pedro Calvo de la Torre y Corral and Josefa de Antequera Henríquez y Cellorigo, he belonged to a family closely linked to the colonial judicial administration. His paternal grandfather, José del Corral Calvo de la Banda, as well as his uncle Juan del Corral Calvo de la Banda, served in audiencias. On his mother’s side, his uncle José Miguel de Antequera y Enríquez stood out as a leading figure in the Paraguayan Comunero Revolt of 1720, and other relatives likewise obtained judicial appointments. His paternal grandfather, Joseph Calvo del Corral, served as oidor in Charcas and Lima, was regent-elect of the Council of Aragon, and brother of Juan Calvo del Corral, oidor of Chile. Through his maternal grandparents, Fernando de Antequera y Henríquez and Luisa de Seleorigo y Zúñiga, he claimed descent from the conquerors of Cusco. He had one brother, Francisco Xavier.

He received his early education at the Seminary of San Antonio Abad in Cusco, where he obtained the degree of Bachelor of Arts on 27 October 1751. He later moved to La Plata (Chuquisaca) to pursue legal studies. After studying at the College of San Juan Bautista, he earned the licentiate in Canon Law and completed his academic training with a doctorate in 1762 at the University of San Francisco Xavier. On 10 October 1763, he was admitted to practice law before the Audiencia of Charcas.

By royal consultation of 28 April and patent of 30 May 1777, he was appointed oidor of the Audiencia of Charcas, replacing Ramón Rivera y Peña. The appointment explicitly emphasized the Crown’s intention to compensate him for the persecutions suffered by his uncle José Miguel de Antequera, then attributed to Jesuit intrigues, recasting him not as a rebel but as a victim. In November 1779, while still in Cádiz, he requested a six-month extension before sailing to the Indies. On 14 March 1780, he obtained license to travel to his post accompanied by his wife, via Buenos Aires. He served as oidor of Charcas until his death. In 1792 he was ordered to pay three thousand pesos to Francisco de Gumucio y Astuena, a councilman of Cochabamba, under penalty of the seizure of one third of his salary.

== Family ==
He was married to Rosa de Cuéllar y Gómez, the daughter of Nicolás de Cuéllar y Baño and Rafaela Gómez de Toledo. Their wedding was celebrated in the Church of San Martín, Madrid on 17 November 1777. The couple had the following children:

- María Ángela Remigia Gertrudis Calvo Cuéllar, born in Madrid on 2 October 1778.
- María Rosa de San Juan de Dios Calvo Cuéllar, born in 1779.
- Bernardo Calvo Cuéllar, born around 1786. Died childless in La Plata on 21 May 1813.
- Mariano Enrique Calvo Cuéllar, born in La Plata on 16 July 1791. Married to María Manuela Dominga Salinas Anglés. He was briefly President of Bolivia. He died in Cochabamba on 29 July 1842.
- Rafael Calvo Cuéllar, born in La Plata on 23 October 1795.
- Mariano José Calvo Cuéllar, born in La Plata on 24 Septiember 1800. Married to María Josefa Toribia Gómez Martínez. He died in Sucre on 23 October 1859. Among his descendats are Gonzalo Sánchez de Lozada and Marcelo Claure.

== Death and legacy ==
Juan de Dios Calvo de la Banda died in La Plata on 7 December 1801, aged 67. He was predeceased by his wife, who died a year before him. They left three orphan sons, one of whom became President of Bolivia and the other a renowned lawyer. They left a vast number of descendants.
