= Cabinet of Tomás Frías I =

Bolivian presidential administration and ministerial cabinet from 1872 to 1873

Cabinet of Tomás Frías Frías I Cabinet
- 33rd Cabinet of the Republic of Bolivia
- 1872–1873
- Date formed: 28 November 1872
- Date dissolved: 9 May 1873 (5 months, 1 week and 4 days)

People and organisations
- President: Tomás Frías
- No. of ministers: 4
- Total no. of members: 5 (incl. former members)

History
- Predecessor: Cabinet of Agustín Morales
- Successor: Cabinet of Adolfo Ballivián

The Frías I Cabinet constituted the 33rd cabinet of the Republic of Bolivia. It was formed on 28 November 1872 after Tomás Frías was sworn in as the 17th president of Bolivia following the assassination of Agustín Morales, succeeding the Morales Cabinet. It was dissolved on 9 May 1873 upon the end of Frías' mandate and was succeeded by the Cabinet of Adolfo Ballivián.

== Composition ==
Portfolio	Minister	Party	Prof.	Took office	Left office	Term	Ref.
President	Tomás Frías	Ind.	Law.	28 November 1872	9 May 1873	162	
Minister of Government and Foreign Affairs	Casimiro Corral	Ind.	Law.	22 June 1871	27 January 1873	585	(Note: Morales + Frías.)
Minister of Government and Foreign Affairs	Melchor Terrazas	Ind.	Law.	27 January 1873	9 May 1873	102	
Minister of War	Ildefonso Sanjinés	Mil.	Mil.	22 October 1871	9 May 1873	565	
Minister of Finance	Pedro García	Ind.	Law.	22 October 1871	9 May 1873	565	
Minister of Justice, Public; Instruction, and Worship	Melchor Terrazas	Ind.	Law.	22 October 1871	27 January 1873	463	
Minister of Justice, Public; Instruction, and Worship	Juan de Dios Bosque	Ind.	Bp.	27 January 1873	9 May 1873	102	(Note: Only religious official to perform ministerial functions.)

== History ==
Upon his assumption to office, Frías ratified all ministerial portfolios in their present positions. No changes to the cabinet originally formed by Agustín Morales occurred until 27 January 1837 when, due to the resignation of Casimiro Corral, a minor reshuffle took place with Minister of Justice Melchor Terrazas being appointed to replace Corral while Vice President of the Council of State Juan de Dios Bosque was appointed to fill Terrazas' position. Notably, Bosque is the only clergyman to have ever held a ministerial position in Bolivian history.

=== Cabinets ===
N°	Formed	Days	Decree
I	28 November 1872	162	Supreme Decree 28-11-1872
