= Tomás Frías =

17th President of Bolivia

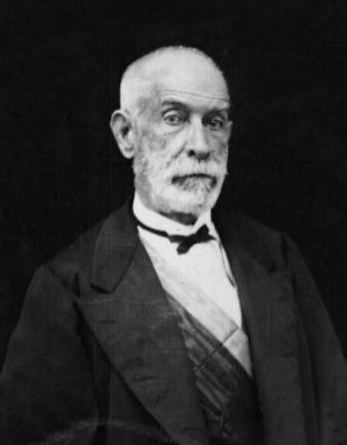

17th President of Bolivia
- In office 14 February 1874 – 4 May 1876; Acting: 31 January 1874 – 14 February 1874
- Preceded by: Adolfo Ballivián
- Succeeded by: Hilarión Daza (provisional)
- In office 28 November 1872 – 9 May 1873
- Preceded by: Agustín Morales (Note: It is agreed by legal records and scholarly sources that Agustín Morales died on 27 November and Tomás Frías assumed office on 28 November. However, some texts in the list of presidents of Bolivia include Juan de Dios Bosque as acting president from the night of the 27th to the 28th. Why some sources include Bosque and others omit him is unclear, though it is possibly due to the fact that executive power was transferred to him automatically and not through any formal processes.)
- Succeeded by: Adolfo Ballivián
Other offices
Minister of Finance
In office 22 June 1871 – 12 September 1871
President	Agustín Morales
Preceded by	Manuel de la Lastra
Succeeded by	Casimiro Corral (acting)
In office 9 December 1857 – 10 November 1858
President	José María Linares
Preceded by	Miguel María de Aguirre
Succeeded by	Himself
In office 23 December 1847 – 2 January 1848
President	Eusebio Guilarte
Preceded by	Miguel María de Aguirre
Succeeded by	Andrés María Torrico (acting)
In office 19 March 1844 – 17 August 1844
President	José Ballivián
Preceded by	Manuel Molina Zamudio
Succeeded by	Miguel María de Aguirre
In office 18 October 1841 – 27 December 1841
President	José Ballivián
Preceded by	Miguel María de Aguirre
Succeeded by	Hilarión Fernandez
Minister of Finance and Foreign Affairs
In office 10 November 1858 – 14 January 1861
President	José María Linares
Preceded by	Himself
Succeeded by	Juan José Ibargüen
Minister of the Interior
Acting
In office 25 November 1847 – 23 December 1847
President	José Ballivián
Preceded by	Pedro José de Guerra
Succeeded by	Basilio Cuéllar
Minister of Public Instruction and Foreign Affairs
In office 28 November 1844 – 23 December 1847
President	José Ballivián
Preceded by	Manuel de la Cruz Méndez
Succeeded by	Domingo Delgadillo
Minister of Public Instruction
In office 16 November 1839 – 16 November 1840
President	José Miguel de Velasco
Preceded by	Office established
Succeeded by	Manuel Sánchez de Velasco

Personal details
- Born: Tomás Francisco Borja Juan José Frías Ametller; 21 December 1805 Potosí, Viceroyalty of the Río de la Plata (now Bolivia)
- Died: 10 May 1884 (aged 78) Florence, Kingdom of Italy
- Party: Independent
- Other political affiliations: Liberal Party
- Spouse: Raimunda Ballivián Guerra
- Children: Carlos Frías Ballivián
- Parent(s): José María de Frías y González; Francisca Alejandra de Ametller Loma y Mendoza
- Education: University of Saint Francis Xavier
- Profession: Lawyer
- Religion: Roman Catholic

Tomás Frías Ametller (21 December 1805 – 10 May 1884) was a Bolivian lawyer and politician who served as the 17th President of Bolivia twice nonconsecutively from 1872 to 1873 and from 1874 to 1876. Having graduated as a lawyer and worked as a merchant, he soon decided to enter the world of politics. His long political career began in 1831, when he was elected to represent Potosí in the Chamber of Deputies. This was followed by his first diplomatic posting when he was sent to France in Bolivia's first ever foreign delegation.

Of his many ministerial positions, the first Frías held was that of Minister of Public Instruction. Throughout the tenure of this first position, Frías carried out wide and sweeping reforms in Bolivian education, establishing statutes and promulgating decrees that played a major role in the country for well over a century. In the following decades, he was to hold several more high positions, namely during the administration of José María Linares. It was during Linares' presidency that Frías worked to solve the anarchic state of Bolivia's fiscal framework. Having been exiled in 1849, he was again forced outside Bolivia when Mariano Melgarejo seized power in 1864. Several years later, in 1870, he moved to La Paz, coincidentally around the same time the revolution that ousted Melgarejo erupted. After the caudillo was dethroned, Frías was elected to the National Assembly of 1871, witnessing the violent closure of said apparatus by President Agustín Morales in 1872.

Only a few days after the forceful closure of the Assembly, Morales was assassinated. That day, Frías was appointed president of the Council of State. According to the Constitution, and with the approval of Congress, Frías became president, hastily calling elections and refusing to remain in power any longer than necessary. Adolfo Ballivián would win the 1873 general election, after which Frías resumed his position as President of the Council of State.

His first term was mostly devoted to the organization, supervision, and scrutiny of the general election of 1873. His brief first term saw few government acts, the Lindsay-Corral Agreement with Chile being one of few. After the death of President Ballivián on 14 February 1874, Frías was constitutionally obliged, in his role as President of the Council of State, to complete the remainder of the constitutional term. During his second term, the Boundary Treaty of 1874 between Chile and Bolivia was signed, supposedly ending the border conflict between the two nations. The violation of the treaty in 1879 would have serious consequences for Bolivia, sparking the War of the Pacific.

While his first term proved to be efficient and stable, though short, his second proved to be the opposite. Facing several military rebellions and conspiracies, the largest and most destabilizing one being led by General Quintín Quevedo and Casimiro Corral, he was unable to maintain stability. Weakened by the constant revolts, Frías was eventually ousted by his former Minister of War, Hilarión Daza. The former president was to remain exiled for the rest of his life, spending his last years in France and Italy. Considered a man of high integrity and a true servant of the state, Frías has been referred to as the "Bolivian Washington".

== Early life and family ==
Tomás Frías was born to a wealthy land-owning family in Potosí on 21 December 1805. He was baptized on 25 January 1806 in the Church of Santiago Apóstol, Potosí. He was raised on the family hacienda in Tarapaya, municipality of Mondragón (36 km from Potosí). He was the son of José María de Frías y González and Alejandra de Ametller y Loma.

While he was in Chile, he married Raimunda Ballivián Guerra—a niece of Pedro José de Guerra—on 10 November 1849 in the city of Valparaíso. She was the daughter of José María Ballivián de los Barrios and María Josefa de Guerra Bustamante. The couple had three children, although only their eldest son, Carlos Frías Ballivián, survived childhood. Raimunda died on 7 September 1853 while they were in Bolivia. Frías never remarried. Carlos married Emilia Yanguas Astete on 10 Dicember 1870 in the Church of San Agustín, La Paz. The couple had at least twelve children.

His brother-in-law of the prominent politician Manuel Molina Zamudio, who married Carmen Frías Ametller on 13 March 1833 in the Church of San Miguel, Sucre. They are the ancestors of María Luisa Sánchez Bustamante Calvo, Carmen Sánchez Bustamante Calvo, and Gonzalo Sánchez de Lozada Sánchez Bustamante.

== Political career ==
=== First political, diplomatic, and ministerial positions (1831–1848) ===
He became lawyer on 13 July 1826, graduating from the University of San Francisco Xavier. However, Frías dedicated himself to commerce, establishing a route from Potosí to Cobija. For two years, he occupied himself with his enterprise until the mutiny against Antonio José de Sucre on 18 April 1828. Frías would accompany the Grand Marshal of Ayacucho during the latter's custody, earning the appreciation of the President. When Sucre left the country, it was the liberator himself that advised Frías to leave his commercial enterprise and enter the world of politics.

In 1831, he was elected to the Chamber of Deputies, representing Potosí. This was the first of many political positions that Frías would hold throughout his long career. 1837, Andrés de Santa Cruz assigned Frías as an official to the first foreign delegation in Bolivia's history, which was sent to France. However, in 1841, he became gravely ill, afflicted with a liver condition, and was permitted to take leave in Europe to receive treatment. Finally, in 1843, Frías returned and was named Minister of Public Instruction and Foreign Affairs by President José Ballivián. In 1844, he succeeded his brother-in-law, Manuel Molina, as Minister of Finance.

==== Reformation of Bolivia's education system (1845–1846) ====
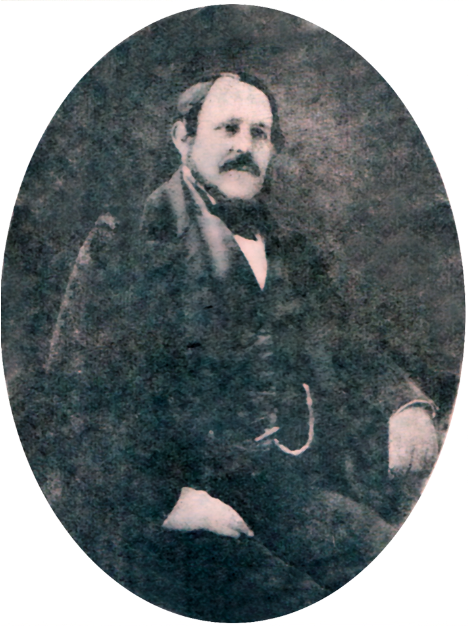
During the administration of Ballivián, Frías carried out extensive reforms in Bolivia's education system.

The decrees promulgated by Ballivián, drafted by Frías, constitute one of the most important body of laws regarding Bolivian education. Roberto Zapata, a bolivian educator, remarks on this, stating: "There were no methods or plans in education. The best-oriented was Tomás Frías, who provided a true statute of instruction with the Organic Decree of the Universities, proposing the division of the Republic into three university districts, with the authority to direct and inspect education at all its levels".

Frías's decrees designed the entire School System of Bolivia in three stages: university education, schools of sciences and arts (secondary), and primary schools. In addition to these stages, Frías considered private teaching lyceums for certain branches of sciences and arts and also envisioned the foundation of state-sponsored schools, which remained only on paper. Frías's decrees brought unity to Bolivia's educational action through the three established stages, including university. These decrees placed great importance on morality, religion, and compliance with laws, which condition justice and good citizen conduct. The so-called Plan Frías distinguished and separated the professional function of university faculties from the humanistic cultural function of colleges or secondary education, which had previously been mixed.

The Organic Decree of Universities, dated 25 August 1845, aimed to remedy the "chaos and contradictions in the legal norms" and established the following provisions: Article 1— The universities are responsible for the direction and supervision of the general education of the country. Article 2— The university is the assembly or corporation of professors, directors, and officials dedicated to teaching in the faculties, colleges, lyceums, institutions, boarding schools, and public or private schools of the district. Article 3— Bolivia is divided into three districts corresponding to the three Universities: Sucre, which includes the Department of Chuquisaca, Potosí, Tarija, and the Province of Litoral. La Paz, corresponding to Oruro and Beni, and Cochabamba with Santa Cruz. Article 8— The University will consist of five faculties: theology, law and political science, medicine, mathematical sciences, physics, and the faculty of humanities and philosophy.

According to the Statute of the Base of Education, part of the decree of 25 August 1845, Frías promulgated the following: Article 33— All classes of all grades will have as their basis: the precepts of the Catholic Religion; fidelity to the Republic and its Constitution, which preserves the unity of Bolivia and the guiding principles of social order; obedience to the statutes of the University and the laws governing Public Instruction. Article 45— The University Council is composed of ten members, selected from the heads of colleges, deans, and professors of the faculties. The decree issued on 15 October 1845, titled "Method of Teaching," organized secondary schools. Among the bases of the decree, it is established that instruction in higher professional studies should be separated from the subjects taught in secondary schools, following the decree of 25 August of the same year, because the school teaches preparatory subjects for professions. The decree stated the following:

Article 19: The teaching in the schools will include: Spanish, Latin, and French; English and German languages; Arithmetic, algebra, geometry, and rectilinear trigonometry; Geography and history; Elements of natural history and physics; Religion. Philosophy and ancillary subjects: drawing, singing, music, according to available resources. The teaching of the Spanish and Latin languages and religion will be as extensive as possible, while the other subjects will be only elementary. According to Article 2, there will be six courses for the study of these subjects; the content will be expanded in higher-level courses, and students will be required to carry out exercises and analyses.—Article 15: The teachers will meet once a week at the home of the rector to report on their observations and the state of the classes, improvements possible in teaching methods and procedures, and the measures to be adopted for discipline. The agreements and results will be recorded in the book kept by the rector.

=== Administrations of Velasco, Belzu, and Córdova (1848–1857) ===
His work in the Ministry of Public Instruction had profound effects in the country, making his most important reforms in 1845 and 1846. When José Miguel de Velasco seized power in 1848, Frías retired to private life, and was later exiled, in 1849, by the government of Manuel Isidoro Belzu because he refused to collaborate with his government. Although allowed to return, Belzu distanced Frías from La Paz. For years, Frías would live in Corocoro, where he dedicated himself to mining and began developing plans as to how best exploit and channel Bolivia's mineral-rich lands.

In 1853, Frías was targeted by the belcista newspapers because of his past refusal to collaborate with Belzu. As such, although not officially exiled, he left the country yet again. Throughout the Belzu administration, Frías would constantly clash with the President and his supporters. This did not mean Frías was critical of the regime but. Rather, he formed part of a moderate opposition that included linaristas and ballivianistas. In fact, he supported Belzu in 1853, when tensions with Peru were high. In 1855, he returned to the country after the election of Jorge Córdova, being appointed as a magistrate of the Supreme Court of Justice. In that capacity, he was part of the council which articulated the Civil Code of 1855. Moreover, Córdova appointed him Prefect of Potosí, however, only temporarily since the country was engulfed in a political crisis as a result of the controversial general election of 1855. Under the command of General Dámaso Bilbao la Vieja, the troops of the rebellious General Gregorio Pérez were crushed, securing Córdova's presidency.

=== Linares administration (1857–1861) ===
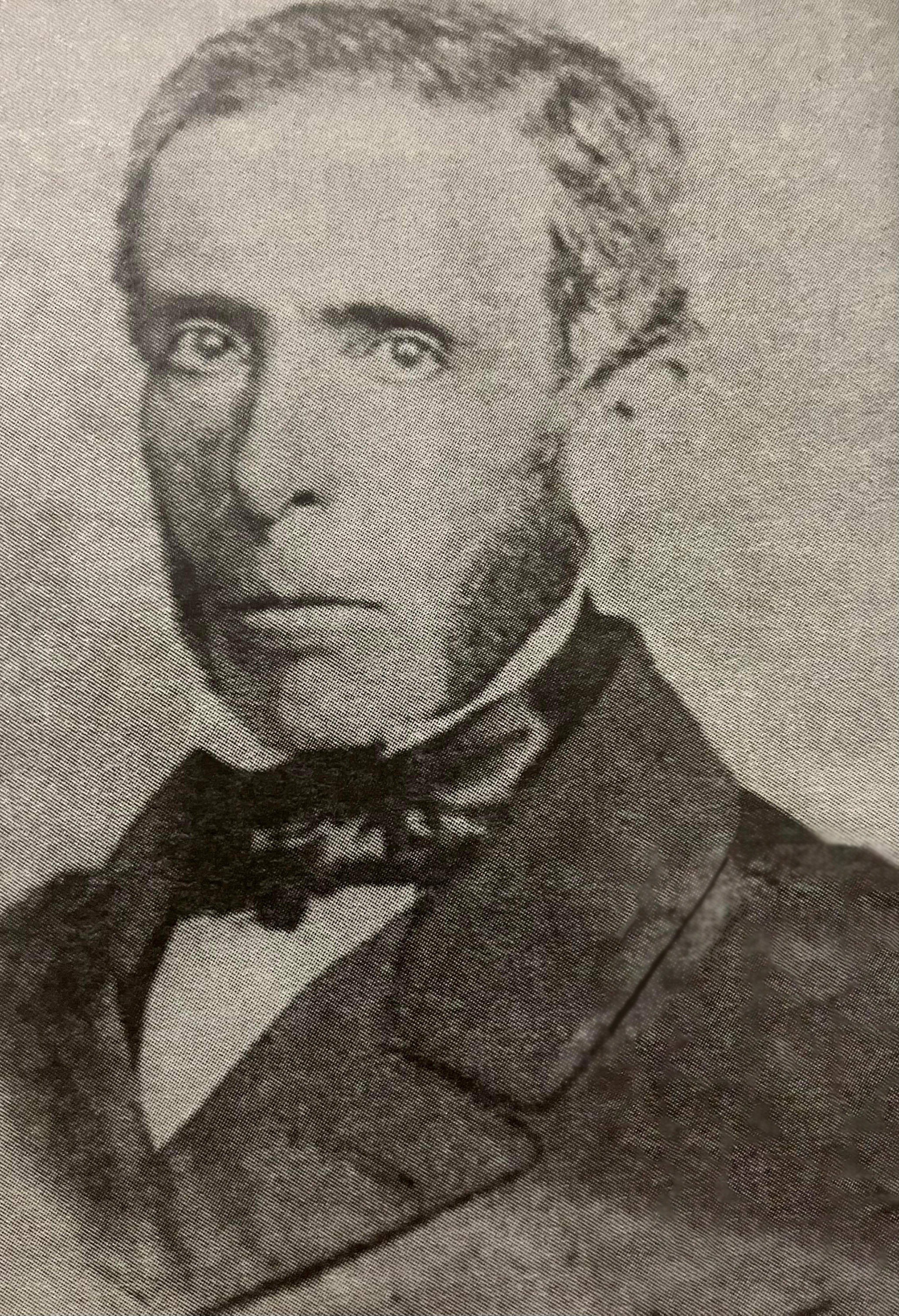
Linares declared himself Dictator of Bolivia, galvanizing the opposition.

Only two years later, José María Linares overthrew General Córdova, and Frías would be appointed Minister of Finance. Under Linares' administration, a group of constitutionalist civilians, referred to as the rojos, surfaced. This faction involved figures such as Mariano Baptista and Adolfo Ballivián, both of whom would go on to preside over the country as presidents. Ballivián would assume leadership of the Partido Rojo (Red Party) in the 1870s. Positions in prefectures and key administrative and judicial roles were filled by individuals who embraced Linares' "regenerative" ideology, believing that the nation required a substantial overhaul to overcome the perceived chaos. Frías, as a member of Linares' cabinet, was influential in the creation of the financial framework of Bolivia's economy. During this tenure, he was very clear and restrictive regarding the administration of the national budget, mainly with regard to the salaries and expenses of officials. The nation's financial situation, in a state of disarray, experienced a rapid turnaround due to the stringent austerity measures implemented to control expenditures. Various measures were taken to boost economic stability, including the reduction of tariffs on imported foreign fabrics through Arica and Cobija. In order to enforce this, he created the Central Fund for Payments, which centralized and organized the national economy after more than twenty years of administrative anarchy. It also created a budget dedicated solely and exclusively to education with which it was possible to buy books, pay salaries and rents and even grant credits and subsidies to schools and universities.

Consequently, the national credit improved from its previously deplorable condition. Despite facing a significant deficit of 115,417 pesos in the 1860 expenditure budget, which totaled 2,339,704 pesos, Frías successfully balanced expenses and revenues in a short period. To curb spending, the army underwent a reduction from 5,000 active personnel to just 1,500. Efforts were made to address the internal public debt, which had been overlooked until then. Frías played a crucial role in this by allowing the free export of gold and other metals, along with drafting a mining code for the country. The quina bank was abolished, facilitating open and easy export of quinine. Frías also promoted the liberalization of other sectors of the national economy such as textiles and minerals (with the exception of silver). He strove to normalize Bolivian monetary policy by refinancing the foreign debt on the one hand and on the other by reminting silver coins in Potosí. Coins were introduced into circulation to address the issues caused by the circulation of a weak currency, and these coins were named pesos-Frías in honor of the minister who designed them. This was part of his plan to improve the feeble currency of the time, and was issued along with the introduction of the pieces of 8 reales.

Regulations for joint-stock companies were established, and plans were set in motion to secure a one-million-pound sterling loan in Europe. This loan, negotiated by Frías, aimed at funding the canalization of the Desaguadero and the construction of a road connecting this point to the Bolivian coast, thus bringing the cities of La Paz, Oruro, and Potosí within reach of the sea. Linares' downfall prevented the realization of the loan, even though the negotiations were nearly concluded at that point. Frías was also the promoter of laws such as the Invention Rights Law of 1858 or Corporations Law of 1860. Furthermore, he spearheaded the movement to create the Central Bank of Bolivia. Regardless of the many uprisings which Linares faced throughput his term, Frías would remain loyal to the Dictator until the latter's overthrow on 14 January 1861.

=== Achá, Melgarejo, and Morales administrations (1864–1872) ===
Frías served as a deputy during the National Assembly of 1861, contributing much to the crafting of the Constitution promulgated that year. A year later, during the general election of 1862, Frías participated as a candidate only to withdraw shortly thereafter and declare his support for General Gregorio Pérez. José María de Achá, the provisional President of Bolivia since the overthrow of Linares, won the elections. However, Achá’s tenure was unstable and faced constant rebellions. On 28 December 1864, Mariano Melgarejo led a successful coup against Achá, leading to Frías' exilement to Europe.

In 1870, Frías returned to Bolivia, hoping to establish himself in La Paz and withdraw to private life. However, on 24 November, a revolution against Melgarejo was ignited. Frías' home was surrounded by his neighbors, calling him to assume the Prefecture of La Paz. On 25 November, Colonel Agustín Morales approached the city and had a private meeting with Frías. In said meeting, Frías professed his plans regarding the direction of the revolution, only to be met with disdain from the Colonel. As such, he renounced the Prefecture and continued his support for the revolution until it triumphed on 15 January 1871, when the forces of José María Calderón were defeated. As a member of the National Assembly which met that year, Frías was present when President Morales sent forces inside the Government Palace to forcefully shut it down.

==== Closure of the National Assembly ====
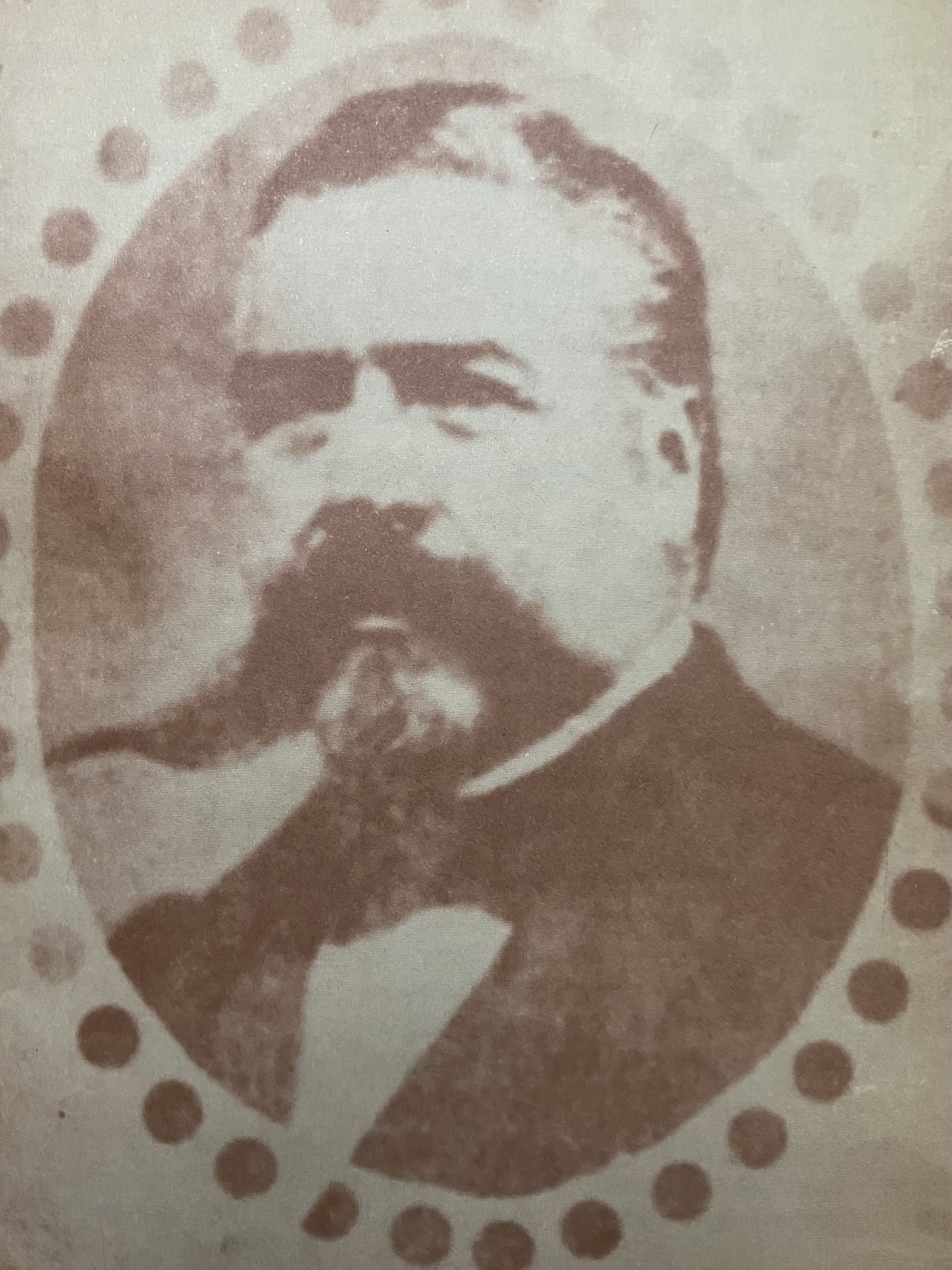
Agustín Morales had a tense relationship with the National Assembly.

On 24 November 1872, with the purpose of celebrating the second anniversary of the triumphant revolution against Melgarejo, the citizens of La Paz crowded the streets, blocking all roads throughout the city. There were bands playing in the main square, the Plaza Murillo, with fireworks and gunshots accompanying the cheering crowd and fanfare. Suddenly, one of the music bands moved to the front of the Government Palace, singing chants which were intended to disrupt the deliberations of the National Assembly, which was in session that night with most of the country's elite politicians, including Frías. Minutes later, a military band entered the Palace and stormed the room where the Assembly met, hurling insults and threats to the politicians who were congregated there. The Palace guard had been overrun by the mob, having resisted the attack but to no avail. Panic filled the room; deputies fleeing the building through any available exit, fearing to be killed. One deputy, Jacinto Villamil, fractured his foot jumping out of a window. The President of the National Assembly, Juan de Dios Bosque, Napoleón Dalence, and Frías were among the few that did not flee.

On 25 November, several deputies wrote to Morales, demanding that the situation be amended. The effort was spearheaded by Frías, who presented the following demands to Morales and his cabinet: an apology from the President to the members of the National Assembly for the events that took place the previous night; the trial and punishment of Colonel Hilarión Daza and Captain Luis Eguino, who had led the charge into the Palace; the promotion of Manuel Lavadenz, who had "bravely" stood his ground against the military band; and the discussion of the Aullagas Question, a controversy involving extraordinary expenditures by the President and his cabinet. The President took this as a challenge, interpreting the demands to be humiliating. As such, he became determined to shut down the Assembly himself. At 15:00, Morales met his ministers and aides-de-camp, announcing the following: "I shall close Congress. Whoever wants to follow me, follow me; whoever does not, do not". The Bolivian Army, stationed in front of the Government Palace, saluted Morales when he entered, singing the Bolivian National Anthem. The President entered the legislative salon alongside his ministers, General Ildefonso Sanjinés, and several other military officers. Morales entered the empty room and gave a lengthy and passionate speech against the deputies that had supported Frías' efforts.

==== Assassination of President Morales ====
With the speech concluded, Morales invested himself with dictatorial powers, which was met with opposition from his own ministers. On 26 November, his entire cabinet resigned. Casimiro Corral, a member of the cabinet, had a turbulent meeting with Morales that culminated with the President throwing himself onto his minister. Morales was only stopped by those present at the meeting, which included José Morales, his son, General Sanjinés, Julio La Faye, Colonel Daza, and Fernando Valverde. That night, Corral fled to the safety of the Minister Plenipotentiary of the United States in Bolivia, Leopold Markbreit. Morales, afraid of a revolution, placed General Sanjinés in charge of all the ministries, convinced that Corral would lead an insurrection against the government. The President is said to have been neurotic and incoherent, sitting on the benches outside the Government Palace and muttering about his two greatest concerns: the closure of the National Assembly and the conspiracies which were unfolding. At 21:45, Morales called one of his aides-de-camp into his office, immediately attacking him. Federico La Faye, aide-de-camp and nephew to the President, tried to calm his uncle down. Then, the President summoned Colonel Nicanor Lavadenz. Punching Colonel Lavadenz twice, Morales said: "Colonel, I hear that you are among those who ruthlessly conspire against me. Go ahead, start a revolution. I authorize you!". Lavadenz replied: "My general, how could I start a revolution against you?"; Morales struck Lavadenz yet again. Then, La Faye, begging his uncle to stop, was struck. Outraged, La Faye asked: "Uncle, how could you disrespect me too!"; he is struck again by the irate President, who retired to his desk. Indignant, La Faye stated: "No one disrespects me"; then, he proceeded to shoot his uncle once. After receiving the first shot, Morales uttered: "You to me, Federico?"; his nephew replied: "Yes, me to you", shooting him five more times. After the dramatic events that unfolded on the night of 27 November, Frías was named President by Congress.

== President of Bolivia ==
=== First term (1872–1873) ===
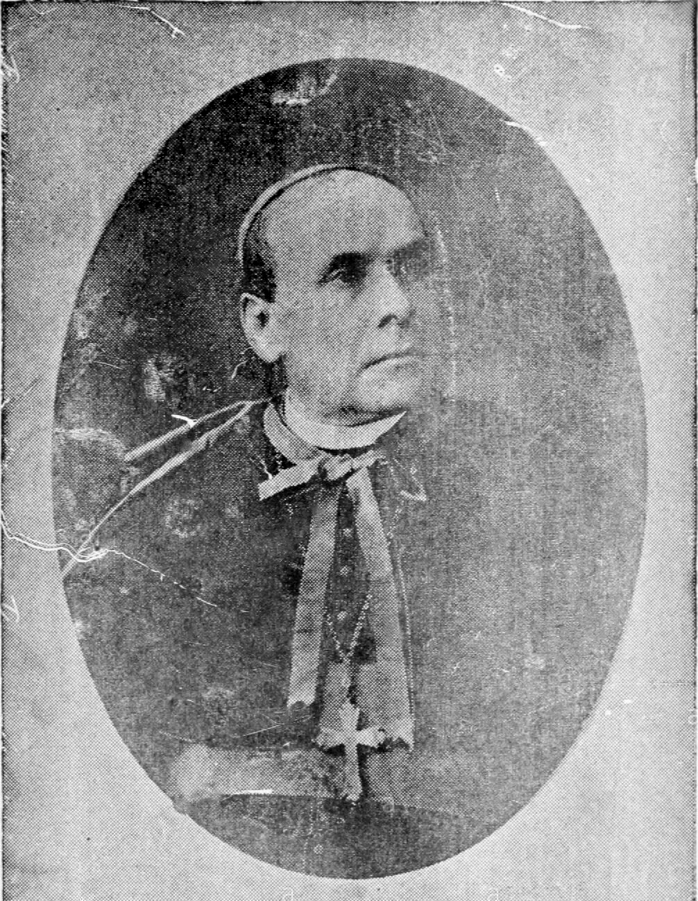
Juan de Dios Bosque held the executive power for less than a day, transferring his position to Frías on 28 November.

When Morales was assassinated in 1872, deputies gathered in the city of La Paz, formed a Council of State and appointed Frías as president so as not to leave the government headless while the political uproar settled.

Thus, on 28 November 1872, he assumed the presidency, immediately calling for elections. Instead of forming a new cabinet, he chose to maintain his predecessor's cabinet. Article 70 of the Constitution dictated that if, in the middle of a presidential term, the president resigned or was dismissed, disabled, absent or dead, the president of the Council of State would be called to carry out the executive power until the end of the constitutional term. Frías refused to finish the remainder of Morales' term, calling for elections. Accepting the President's compromise, the National Assembly proposed that Article 70 be changed. As per the proposal, the president of the Council of State would still be called to carry out the executive power, however, within thirty days would have to set a date for elections, convening the Assembly for three months after this decree had been promulgated.

The Lindsay-Corral Agreement, signed on 5 December 1872.

One of the first administrative acts of the newly formed government was to conclude a diplomatic agreement that was signed on 5 December between the Minister of Foreign Affairs, Casimiro Corral, and the Minister Plenipotentiary of Chile, Santiago Lindsay. The purpose of the agreement was to settle any issues which had arisen during the negotiations of the earlier boundary treaty of 1866. Corral had already announced, in his memorandum to the Assembly of 1872, that negotiations were under way to smooth out these difficulties. However, two stipulations were contested vehemently by the Assembly. The first was the division of the guano deposits and profits between the two nations; the second regarded the export rights of the metals extracted from the territory between the parallels 23º and 25º. These issues would not cease to be a hotbed of tension for the two nations in the future. Corral reported he had reached an agreement with Chile and was ordered to submit a transcript of the negotiations, to be presented for discussion for the next extraordinary Assembly, to be convened on 23 April 1873. Foreign relations with the United States were also a matter of importance during Frías' first term. Upon the death of Morales and the inauguration of Frías, the President of the United States, Ulysses S. Grant wrote the following message to the new administration:

Great and Good Friend:— I have had the honor to receive the letter which Your Excellency addressed to me on the 1st of December 1872, announcing your accession, under the Constitution of your Country, to the Chief Magistracy of Bolivia, left vacant by the sudden and melancholy death of General Morales. Permit me to wish you every success in discharging the duties of the high trust which has devolved upon you, and to express the hope that the relations between the United States and Bolivia may be no less amicable during your administration than they have happily been in the past.— Your Good Friend,— U.S. Grant.

A major controversy during his first term was the López Gama affair. The affair started when the entrepreneur Pedro López Gama sued the government for the loss of 200,000 tons of guano, amounting to 2,000,000 pesos. López won the lawsuit against the Bolivian government, the court ruling that a 1,000,000 peso compensation was in order. In order to pay such a figure, the State was forced to auction off the estaca-mines of Aullagas to the highest bidder. López, who purchased the majority of said mines, would end up the sole remaining owner of the Bolivian mining interests in the Atacama.

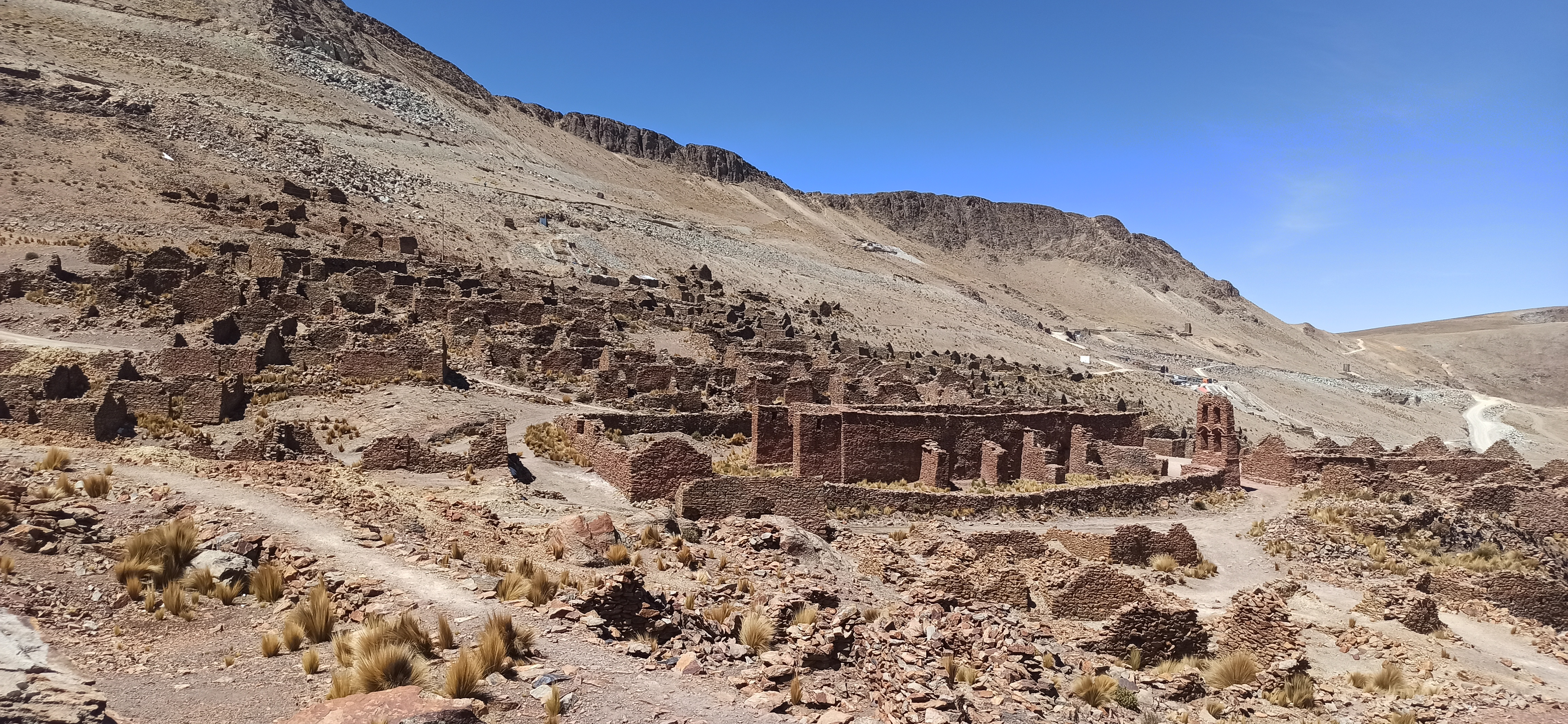
Ruins of the Aullagas mine.

==== 1873 general election ====
The date for the general election was set to be on the first Sunday of March, 1873, by a supreme decree issued on 13 December 1872. During the general election of 1873, Adolfo Ballivián, Casimiro Corral and Quintín Quevedo were the most prominent candidates. While the first two candidates represented their own constitutional factions, Quevedo represented the remnants of the old melgarejista party. This faction hoped to retake the lands which had been repatriated to its previous owners, seized by the government of Melgarejo and bestowed to his loyal allies during the regime of the caudillo. The top three candidates of the election were Ballivián, Corral, and Quevedo, receiving 6,442; 5,352; and 3,313 votes respectively. There was a total of 16,674 votes, and none of the candidates achieved the majority necessary as stipulated by the Constitution, meaning that the National Assembly was now tasked to choose among the three candidates with the most votes. The first round concluded with 31 votes for Ballivián, 20 for Corral, and 6 for Quevedo. The second round, contested between Ballivián and Corral, finalized with the former obtaining 41 votes and the latter 19. Thus, Ballivián defeated both Corral and Quevedo and was proclaimed President of Bolivia. Both Corral and Quevedo, as they had promised prior to their respective candidatures, accepted and acknowledged the victor of the elections as the legitimate successor to Frías. The entirety of this short first term was dedicated to presiding over these elections in the most transparent way possible. Through intense scrutiny, Frías conducted, by far, the cleanest elections in 19th century Bolivia.

=== Second term (1874–1876) ===
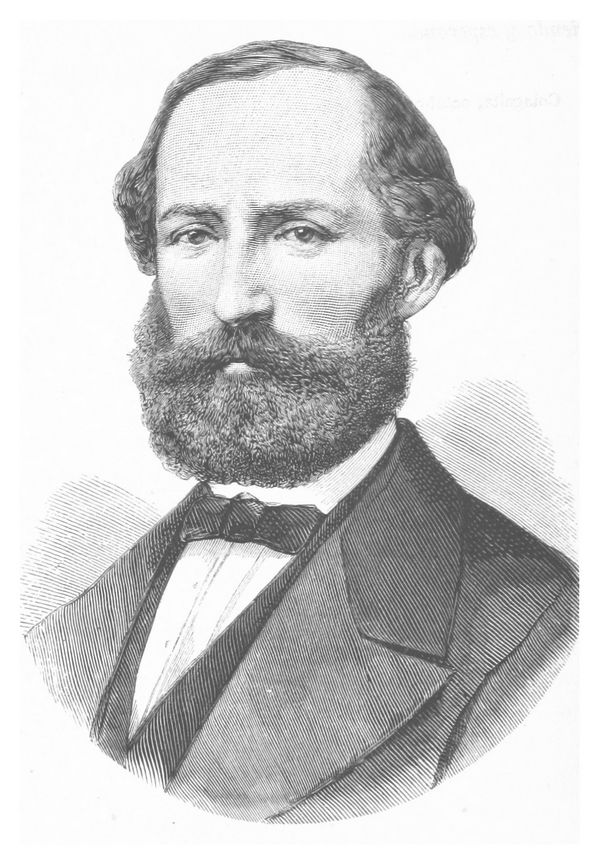
Ballivián's death brought Frías back to the presidency.

On 14 February 1874, Ballivián died. Frías had been exercising the executive power, as acting president, since 31 January, when Ballivián no longer had the strength to continue with his administrative roles. The entire ministerial cabinet which had served under Ballivián offered its resignation, however, Frías opted to maintain the same ministers as he had done after the death of Morales. It was no surprise to the general public that Frías found himself as President yet again. It was known for some months that Ballivián was severely ill. Although at first there were no challenges to the new administration, soon discontent spread throughout the nation. Especially in the Departments of La Paz and Cochabamba, a robust opposition against Frías formed, questioning the legitimacy of his accession to the Presidency. Paradoxically, during the administration of Ballivián, Frías was believed to have been the rightful and truly constitutional successor of Morales. Now that Ballivián was dead, his legitimacy was vehemently questioned.

==== Challenges to government legitimacy ====
The first act of his second administration was a supreme decree issued on 2 March. The decree stipulated the reduction of funding for municipalities, which had been far too burdensome, and at the expense of the government and the Ministry of Public Instruction. This new law also outlined that municipalities had to account for their expenditures, requiring them to report and seek the approval of the National Assembly for any extraordinary expense. This was met with resistance from the municipal governments, namely that of La Paz, which claimed the new law to be unconstitutional and a violation of the autonomy that had been granted to municipalities for decades. The municipal authorities of the city of Cochabamba protested against this law as well. After the complaints issued from several municipalities, a council of ministers deemed it to be an adequate law and promulgated it, being officially made legislation on 8 April, regardless of all the resistance the decree had met. Newspapers in La Paz condemned the government, inciting further dissidence and encouraging the rebelliousness of General Daza. In order to pacify the young General, Frías called Daza to Sucre. When he refused, the President headed to Oruro to offer him the Ministry of War. Although Daza had turned down the offer, Frías returned to Sucre and passed a supreme decree on 13 May, making Daza his Minister of War. By doing so, the President hoped to pacify the country and prevent a civil war, one which Daza might have sparked. Many criticized the President for this action, since it gave power and legitimacy to a man that had tirelessly conspired against the government. However, Frías saw this as his only option, separating Daza from his center of power and taking him far away to Sucre. Nonetheless, this appointment had serious implications for the future, ominously setting the stage for the final rebellion which dethroned Frías in coming years.

=== 1874 National Assembly ===
As per the Constitution, legislative elections were to be held that year. In La Paz, out of the four possible deputies, not a single ally of the current administration had won. In fact, all the winners belonged to the opposition and included Casimiro Corral. In Cochabamba, three out of four winners were from the opposition, including General Quevedo. The general opposition against Frías began to rise, with many newspapers throughout the country publishing anti-government propaganda. Nonetheless, Frías and his government called the Assembly to meet, eager to discuss issues concerning the national budget, with the President determined to carry out a General Audit in said upcoming session. The discussion about the economic condition of the country began with the burdensome Valdeavellano loan, an agreement made during the administration of President Morales. 500,000 pesos were borrowed, with an interest rate of 8% per annum, at an initial rate of 5%. The loan could only be cancelled six months after the initial agreement and was renewable for three months after its termination, considering that the lender be paid with the same percentage of interest for every semester thereafter. By 1874, the debt had increased to 673,000 pesos, requiring 90,000 pesos annually at an interest rate of 18% per annum, causing a massive burden on the national economy. On 24 July, the Assembly decided to pay the entirety of the debt.

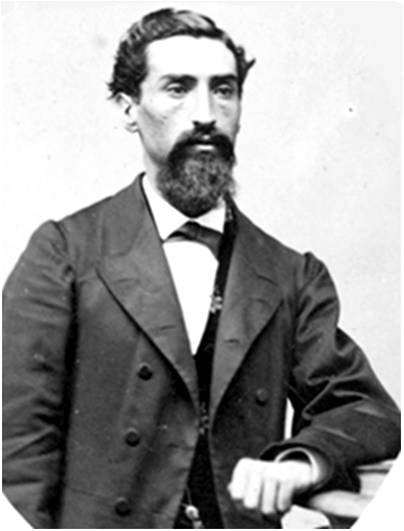
Casimiro Corral, a staunch adversary of Frías.

On 10 August, the Assembly met to discuss two proposals which the President wanted to introduce for debate. After his introductory speech, Frías presented them. In summary, his proposals were the introduction of an organic law of military conscription and a municipal reform. His proposal for military conscription was based on his belief that Bolivia had found itself in constant anarchy since its birth because of the army; that because the army had not been constitutionally conscripted, anarchic and revolutionary ideals arbitrarily abounded in the army. He added that the arbitrary recruitment of soldiers, a practice that had dominated the country since independence, had been unconstitutional and therefore had to be amended. After all, it was the Bolivian Army that was in charge of defending the laws and the constitution which dictated them; that was their purpose, defend democracy and liberty, not work for their own personal gain. Regarding municipalities, Frías believed that each municipality had to submit their deliberations which were to be examined and discussed by the National Assembly. Without much debate, the Assembly agreed with this proposal.

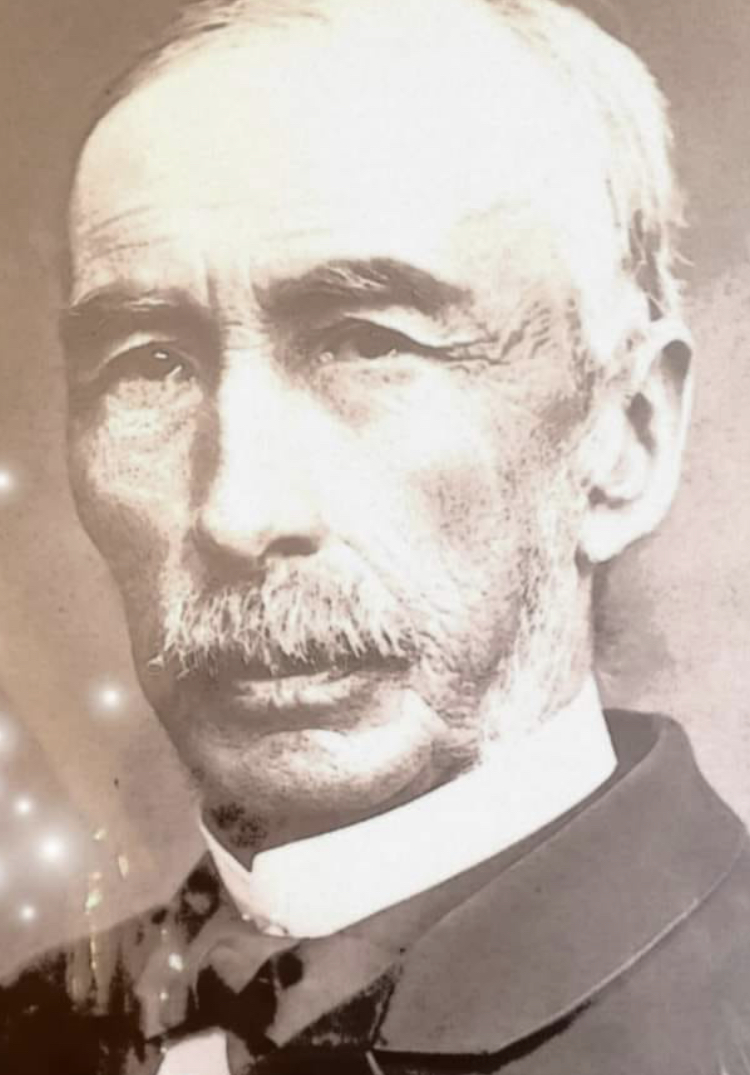
Pantaleón Dalence, Minister of Finance between 1873 and 1875.

The continued resistance from the municipalities was deemed unconstitutional and resulted in a council of ministers having to officially approve the law and enforce it. As a result of this bureaucratic insubordination, Frías ordered each ministry to present their official reports for the year 1873. The Ministry of Finance presented that the government had, in the previous year, a total income of 3,447,785.88 pesos; total expenditures of 3,660,679.69 pesos; and a déficit of 212,993.81 pesos. The Ministry of Public Instruction presented evidence of its strict adherence to the Law of Free Teaching, enacted on 22 November 1872. This law stipulated the following principles: the promotion public instruction; the practice free teaching at the municipal level; and the acknowledgement of instructors as the representatives of their communities. The Ministry of War assured the Assembly of the army's continued support for the current administration. Moreover, it presented to the Assembly that there was 1,789 active military personnel in the country. The Ministry of Foreign Affairs presented that an agreement had been finally reached with Chile regarding the border conflict; that Chile and Bolivia had finally reached the conclusion of the unfinished treaty signed in 1866 under Melgarejo.

Finally, the time to discuss the most important concern in the minds of the anxious deputies had come. The questioned legality of the Frías administration was put to discussion, and it was agreed by the majority, and a revision committee, that the President was indeed serving constitutionally. Even some of his own detractors, such as General Quevedo and his party, accepted the legality of Frías' accession; however, Corral and his partisans vehemently rejected it. The corralistas argued that, Frías, having renounced the Presidency in 1873, had also renounced the Presidency of the Council of State and, thus, could not possibly be considered the legal successor of the deceased Ballivián.

On 7 September, the Assembly discussed the municipalities crisis which emerged from the so-called "law of 2 March", placing municipalities under the scrutiny of the government. This had caused the insubordination of several municipal councils and had led to resistance. A passionate and lengthy discussion ensued, ending indecisively and failing to solve the issue at hand.

==== Debate over constitutional reform ====
With the question of legitimacy solved, the most important concern now was Article 70 of the Constitution and whether it should be changed or not. As had been proposed earlier, when a succession crisis occurs, the president of the Council of State was to assume the interim presidency and call for elections. During the session of the 22 and 24 of August, the Assembly presented a report which rejected the proposed reform. Those who opposed the government, claiming that popular democracy had not been at play when Frías assumed the Presidency, believed that a Vice President should be the heir in case of an emergency. Nonetheless, the reform of Article 70 of the Constitution was rejected after General Quevedo declared himself against it. The discussion moved to the reform of Article 62, which required any government official to have been born in Bolivia. It was proposed that this only apply to the position of President and deputy. This proposal was rejected, and no further discussion was held on the matter. Another proposed reform involved Article 40, which stipulated that the National Assembly was to meet every 6 August in the capital. The proposal stated that the President be able to choose another city in case of extraordinary circumstances. Some proposed that a capital finally be chosen, since, for decades, the Assembly had met in many different cities. This reform was rejected as well. The reform of Article 12, which stipulated that a debtor could not be imprisoned, was also discussed; it was proposed that this Article be changed. The reasons stated generally pointed to the harm the Article had caused to the economy, the mining industry, and commerce. This reform led to a long and arduous discussion which was finalized on 2 September, with the majority failing to achieve the two thirds necessary for a constitutional reform to take place.

==== Land Ex-entailment Law ====
Ever since the conquest of Peru by the Spanish, the indigenous inhabitants had been in charge of their communal lands. A fact which was changed when Melgarejo seized these lands and redistributed them. This was reverted in 1871, but had not materialized yet, leaving it up to the National Assembly of 1874 to solve the issue at hand. On 5 October, the Land Ex-entailment Law was decreed, which indicated the right of ownership of the lands inherited by the ancestors to the indigenous people and for whose legalization only the possession of the title is needed, which was issued at the cost of 10 cts. and gave absolute rights and legal certainty to the indigenous over their properties.

==== Madeira-Mamoré Railway Company ====
Frías, who was hoping to expand Bolivia's economic horizons with foreign enterprises, held several sessions exclusively for the Madeira-Mamoré Railway Company. The Minister of Finance, Pantaleón Dalence, reported in a memorandum that the company had been paralyzed after it ceased construction due to a lawsuit. Colonel George Earl Church, an engineer hired for this enterprise, appealed to British tribunals in hopes of resuming the construction, hoping to also obtain aid from British investors with shares in the company. The issue was barely debated during the November sessions of the National Assembly, with only a single deputy denouncing the irregularities of the company. However, to the majority it seemed clear that the potential benefits of this enterprise were far too great to abandon. As such, the majority voted in favor of the company, and on 25 November, the Assembly passed a law with the following provisions: Of the funds withheld in the Bank of England, 83% of the loan contracted by Colonel Church, on behalf of the Republic of Bolivia, will continue to be applied exclusively to the construction of the Madeira-Mamoré railway; after the construction of the railway is completed, the shipping company will be required to pay the additional capital needed for the completion of the work, with negotiated funds from its account; the government will lend all its support to the company, ensuring its success; the formation of a special commission to settle the pending lawsuits before the Court of Chancery of England and to reconstitute the contract, granting new deeds, in which the guarantees that must be provided by the navigation company, or by any new ones, will be recorded; the recruitment of contractors for the construction of the railway. Furthermore, negotiations will take place to determine the manner in which the loan should be served; the liability of the companies in case the work is not carried out; the term in which the work of the railway must begin and end, and the way in which the companies must communicate with the government during the operations of the company; and finally the mortgage of the proceeds of the railway and of the shipping company for the amortization of the loan. In case the company cannot continue construction due to lack of additional capital or the guarantees that the new contractors must provide, the former executive will be subject to the law issued on 5 November 1873.

=== Corral Plot ===
The majority of the Army had been stationed in La Paz toward the end of Ballivián's term. Severino Zapata had been named commander of the army present there and the prefecture of La Paz was left to José Iriondo, while Belisario Salinas was in Sucre exercising his duties as deputy. Casimiro Corral, who had left Bolivia earlier, had been inciting rebellion from Peru, and returned after he was elected deputy during the legislative election of May 1874. Corral's return to La Paz was worrisome for the government since his very home had become a place of daily anti-government meetings. This greatly troubled the public, which feared that a conspiracy was unfolding. The night of 7 September, the Prefect of La Paz ordered the conspirators at Corral's house to disperse. Corral followed the instruction, however, the following morning an even larger number of plotters met at his house. A mob began forming in the streets of La Paz, being serenaded by Corral from one of his windows. At 8:00, the Prefect sent the police to disperse the crowd. Refusing the Prefect's demand to disperse and give up weapon, Corral's denial was followed by a loud applause from the crowd. Then, the chief of police, Espectador Rivas, ordered Corral's house to be surrounded. Corral shut his door, however, it was forcefully opened by the police, who captured him and 26 other conspirators. This controversy created a nationwide debate on whether Corral should be tried for treason or not. Nonetheless, on 23 October, Frías decreed a general amnesty to the conspirators involved in Corral's plot.

=== 1874 Boundary Treaty ===
==== Border conflict between Bolivia and Chile ====
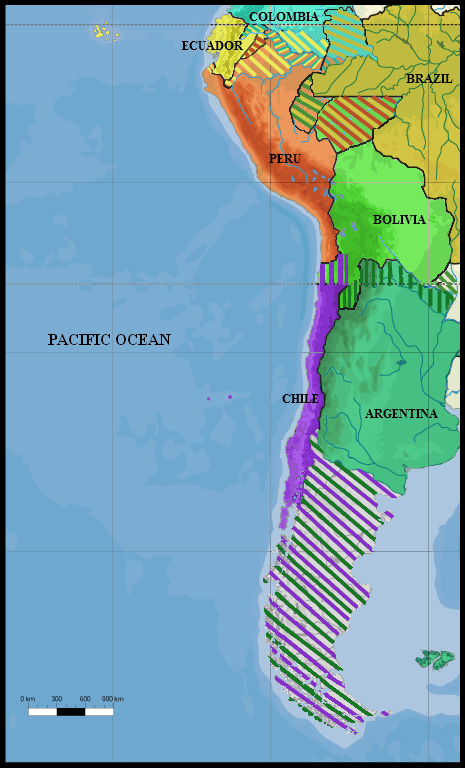
A map of South America depicting the disputed Atacama desert coast between Bolivia and Chile.

From the time of the Incas, the Atacama Province, known as Litoral during the Republican era of Bolivia, had been a part of their vast empire. Even once the Spanish colonized the region, the 25° parallel was recognized as the southernmost point of the Peruvian Viceroyalty. This fact was evident in the capitulations celebrated between the Crown of Spain and the conquistadores Francisco Pizarro and Diego de Almagro. When Pedro de Valdivia had been made captain-general of what became Chile, the range of the territory was to be between the 27° and 41° parallels. Centuries later, the Royal Ordinance of Intendants of 1782, decreed by the metropole, announced the Atacama Province was invariably and permanently attached to the Province of Potosí. On 10 October 1803, the Spanish Crown affirmed that the Viceroyalty of Peru was the rightful owner of the Atacama Province as far as the Paposo River, which has since dried out. When guano was discovered in the Litoral during the republican era, foreign companies were invited to exploit the deposits. These companies were assigned the area between the Loa and Paposo rivers by minister Hilarión Fernández and Frías on 28 March 1842. The illegal exploitation of guano was prosecuted by the Supreme Court of Bolivia, and even by British tribunals. On 31 October of that same year, Chile declared its ownership of all the guano deposits in the Atacama Province. A year later, the Chilean government officially created the Province of Atacama. Casimiro Olañeta and Frías were sent to negotiate with Chile, however, negotiations never took place. In 1847, Chilean guaneros penetrated Bolivian territory as far back as the Mejillones Bay, even building a fort there and placing the Chilean flag on top. The Prefect of Cobija destroyed the fort and dispersed the guaneros, maintaining sovereignty for a decade until it was challenged again. In 1857, José Goñi Prieto, at the helm of the Esmeralda, seized the Mejillones Bay. Negotiations were opened between the two governments, ending on 2 September 1861, with no results. Retaking Mejillones became a priority of the government, such that the National Assembly which met in Oruro in 1863 authorized the declaration of war with Chile if negotiations reached a dead end.

==== Chincha Islands War and the 1866 Treaty ====
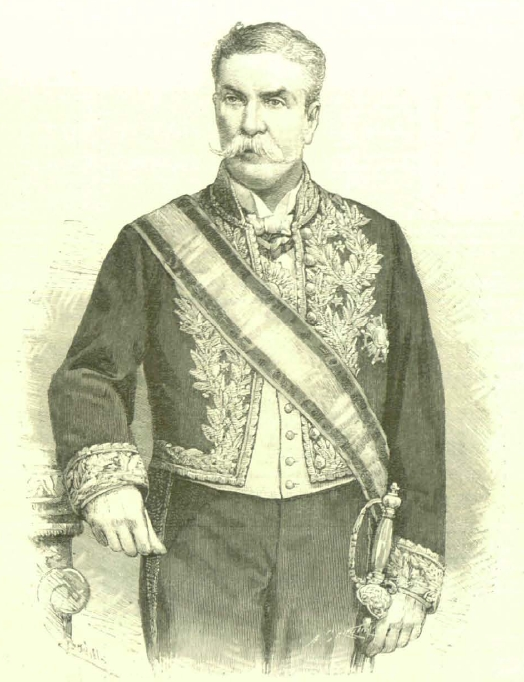
Vergara negotiated the boundary treaty of 1866 with President Melgarejo in hopes of ending Bolivian neutrality.

On 14 April 1864, the Chincha Islands, off the coast of Peru, were occupied by Spanish sailors. The Spanish Crown claimed that, since it had not recognized the independence of Peru, only a truce had stopped hostilities for the past decades. These guano-rich islands were coveted by the Spanish government, and their occupation led to a temporary ceasefire in the hostilities between Chile and Bolivia. Peru and Chile proclaimed an alliance against the Spanish invaders, known as the American Union, which Frías supported. This conflict against their former overlords became known as the Chincha Islands War. President Achá had been reluctant to join, since Spain had recognized Bolivian independence and the two countries had good relations ever since. However, his stance was not seen favorably by the public, which embraced Frías' criticisms of the government's inaction. However, Achá's reluctance was also based on the major disadvantages the allies would face against Spain. The war would be a maritime one and, with the inferiority of the allied navy, the Spanish could only be defeated if they were starved and had no port to refuel and equip themselves. Bolivian neutrality provided the Spanish with said ports, threatening the American Union. As such, in 1866, the Chilean government sent Aniceto Vergara Albano to negotiate with Melgarejo. Reaching and agreement with Vergara, Melgarejo scrapped the casus belli against Chile, issued in 1863 by the National Assembly, and signed a treaty in March of that year. On 10 August, Juan Ramón Muñoz, Bolivian Minister Plenipotentiary to Chile, consolidated the agreement with the Chilean Minister of Foreign Affairs, Álvaro Covarrubias. Thus, the Boundary Treaty of 1866 between Chile and Bolivia was concluded, yet never ratified. The treaty stipulated that the 24° parallel would serve as the border between the two nations; the territory between the 23° and 25° parallels would be mutually exploited and profits divided between the two countries; and the right to export the minerals found in the same condominial territory. Bolivia was obligated to open a customs office in Mejillones, and it was to be the only fiscal office which could deal with the production of guano and the exportation rights of the metals in the condominial territory. Between the 24° and 25° parallels, Chile had complete sovereignty and all the rights to import and export without having to declare through customs.

==== Agreement and ratification of the 1874 Treaty ====
The governments that followed Melgarejo also acknowledged the treaty, yet it was not put into effect even then. It was only, as aforementioned, on 5 December 1872, that an agreement was reached between the two nation's ministers of the exterior, known as the Lindsay-Corral Agreement. After much delay, the treaty was finally signed on 6 August 1874 in Sucre, sealed by the foreign ministers of each nation, Mariano Baptista and Carlos Walker Martínez. The treaty stipulated that the official border between the two countries was the 24° parallel, stretching from the Pacific coast to the Andes cordillera. Between the 23° and 24° parallels, the profits from the exploitation of already existing guanerias, and any further guano to be discovered in the future, were to be divided in half by the two countries. The rights to exploit minerals in the condominial territory was not to increase the quota on what was already being charged at the time. Furthermore, Chilean people and industries could not be levied any further taxes for 25 years after the signing of the treaty. Any Chilean imports entering the Bolivian Litoral through the condominial territory would not be subject to duties nor tariffs. This would apply for Bolivia in the territory between the 24° and 25° parallels. Finally, Chile officially renounced its rights to Mejillones and Antofagasta, for which Bolivia had to provide monetary compensation. The treaty and its stipulations were presented by Frías to the National Assembly, which had met on 21 August. A debate ensued and engulfed Bolivian politics for months to come. Finally, on 5 November, a proposal to renegotiate was presented and, on 9 November, the Boundary Treaty of 1874 was approved and promulgated with the proposed modifications made by the National Assembly. Frías was aware that the clause on mineral rights was considered unjust, as such, he created the Mining Code which emphasized the adjudication of inorganic or nonmetallic substances. The violation of this treaty by General Daza, in 1879, resulted in the occupation of Antofagasta by the Chilean Army and the subsequent declaration of war by the Bolivian National Assembly. Thus, igniting the War of the Pacific.

=== Quevedo's Revolution (1874–1875) ===
==== Mutiny of the third battalion ====
The third battalion of the Bolivian Army rebelled against its leaders on 30 November 1874, embarking upon a disorganized march toward the city of Cochabamba. At 18:30, the authorities of the city, who were celebrating some sort of feast in Calacala, formed a column and began marching. Quickly realizing they could not fight the rebels with such a diminutive force, they retreated to Quillacollo. The column was exiting the city, marching on Juan de Dios Street, when the battalion encountered them and fired. Carlos Villegas, the commander general of Cochabamba, tried to suppress the rebels but was captured and incarcerated. General Quevedo, who was on his way back from fulfilling his duties as a deputy in Sucre, negotiated with the insurgents and obtained the release of Villegas. Although pacified, the battalion demanded that their wages, not paid for over five months, be paid in full. On 1 December, the municipal bank loaned 4,000 pesos to the authorities, who used the money to pay the battalion's arrears. At 10:30, on 2 December, the same battalion declared itself in mutiny, yet again, and proclaimed General Daza as president. Quevedo again pacified the battalion, proclaiming himself superior military chief and commander of the Department of Cochabamba until a commission could decide how to best amend the situation. Thus, by 4 December, Quevedo was officially in charge of the Department and had named Miguel Aguirre as Prefect. After Quevedo appointed sub-prefects, he led the battalion out of Cochabamba on 7 December. When Frías became aware of the mutiny, he sent Daza and the first battalion to deal with the situation. On 9 December, the President passed a supreme decree which ordered the circulation of the powers which had been granted to the government by virtue of Article 20 of the Constitution. This Article gave the government emergency powers whenever facing a major rebellion and suspended some liberties. On 21 December, with the news of Daza's approach, the third battalion was completely dispersed. The following day, he entered Cochabamba and found the revolution completely extinguished.

==== Revolution spreads to La Paz ====
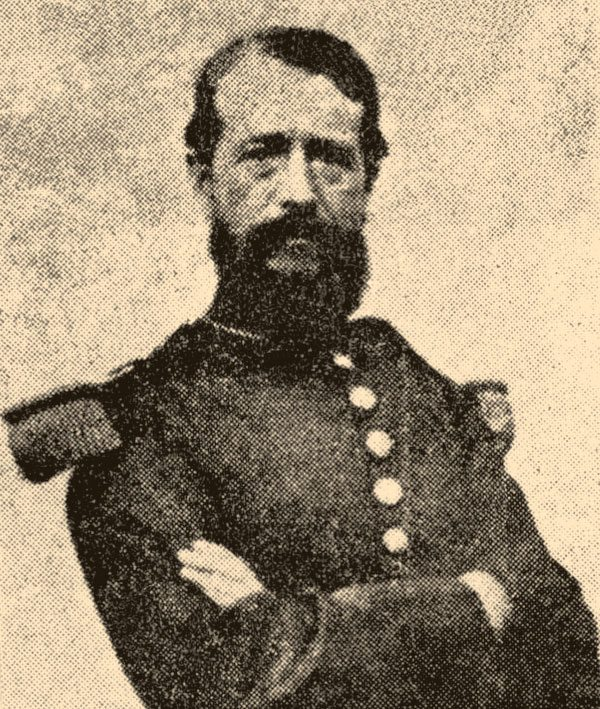
General Quevedo tirelessly conspired against President Frías.

In La Paz, news of the mutiny in Cochabamba gave the quevedistas and corralistas an opportunity to spread revolutionary ideas against the government. On 23 December, at 11:00, the second battalion, which was stationed in La Paz, mutinied. The signal was given by a sentinel who fired a shot and shouted: "Long live Quevedo!"; 25 minutes later, the battalion had seized the city. Although Quevedo had been defeated in the elections of 1873, he had not surrendered his aspirations of occupying the Palacio Quemado and had continued conspiring to take power by any means. An hour after the second battalion had seized the city, a representative of Quevedo entered the city and accepted the revolution in the name of the General. On 24 December, Generals Gregorio Pérez and Gonzalo Lanza declared themselves for the revolution, promising to maintain order in La Paz after the city witnessed three days of chaos that had left many dead. As promised, on the 25 and 26 of December, the revolutionary cuirassiers cleaned the city of looters and murderers. On 5 January 1875, Quevedo entered the city, paradoxically only months after he had voted in favor of Frías at the National Assembly, helping the President to solve the question of legitimacy with his vote. Although Quevedo had resources, he did not have the approval of the masses and lacked popularity, an issue which he had to solve in order to carry out his revolution.

Casimiro Corral had been living in Puno for the past months when the revolutions of Cochabamba and La Paz took place. Regardless of his opposition to Frías, on 1 January, he declared himself in favour of the government in a lengthy manifesto, where he decried the violence committed in La Paz by the revolutionaries. However, Corral's declaration carried no weight, as he truly intended to take over the revolution instead of preventing the fall of the government. As such, on 5 January, Corral and Quevedo met, and the two caudillos came to an agreement which was published on 9 January as a revolutionary manifesto. Corral, who had earned his popularity by rebelling against Melgarejo and playing a leading role the revolution that ousted him. However, he was now allied to one of the most prominent melgarejistas left in the country; the right-hand man of Melgarejo. Joining his contender, Corral, Quevedo would organize an army of 1,200 men, and had left La Paz on the morning of 10 January. The President, having heard of the revolution in Cochabamba, was head toward that city and was at the center of the government forces, personally leading his troops. Frías would camp in Calamarca, and departed in pursuit of Quevedo's army on 14 January at the head of an army of 600 men.

==== Battle of Chacoma ====
Quevedo stationed his army at the ranch of Chacoma, a place that was dominated by a gentle slope from the East, which was exactly where Frías was coming from. On 18 January, the government forces arrived and, catching the rebels by surprise, attacked. At first, there was heavy fire from rebel machine guns, their smoke darkening the atmosphere for a moment. Their projectiles fell two meters away from the government army's line, which, throwing a general hurrah, continued marching forward. Colonel Ramon González advanced with his company, fighting with "recklessness and courage"; Colonel Juan Granier entered the fight on foot at the head of his company. Even President Frias participated in the early stages of the battle. He remained in the action even after the combat began to grow more ferocious and, with his ministers Mariano Baptista and Daniel Calvo, refused to withdraw to the reserves. His son, Carlos Frías, tried to stop him, warning his father that he could get killed. The 70-year-old President replied: "What does it matter?". He then signalled his troops ahead in the midst of a barrage of bullets. The impetuous and aggressive advance of the government forces on enemy lines was firm and organized. Frías'charge was so forceful that, after sustaining a 25-minute fire, it was able to break the enemy line, only to find the rebel forces completely dispersed and defeated. Very few casualties were inflicted on the government forces. Among the dead were: Colonel Jacinto Matos, who was in the vanguard as captain, and two soldiers from the first battalion; Casto Eizaguirre, of the same company, and Lieutenant Colonel Rudesindo Niño de Guzmán: and 8 soldiers. Quevedo's troops suffered 100 casualties, and only 583 prisoners, out of the thousands of rebel soldiers present at the battle, were taken since many of them had fled at the beginning of the battle.

=== Revolution of Cobija and continued dissidence ===
On 16 January, a rebellion broke out in Cobija, proclaiming Quevedo as the supreme leader of Bolivia. The Prefect of Cobija, Emilio Fernández Costas, was replaced by the collaborator Raimundo Taborga. Fernández sent orders to his men to be stationed near La Chimba, and on 27 January, the rebels occupied the main plaza of Antofagasta. Juan de Dios Ribera had put himself at the head of the revolution in Cobija after the government authorities were completely expelled from the region. However, when they learned of Quevedo's defeat at Chacoma on 18 January, they submitted themselves to the government and requested guarantees. The government agreed and allowed them leave the country. By 3 February, the ring leaders had fled to Iquique, with General Daza finding the Litoral completely pacified by the time he arrived.

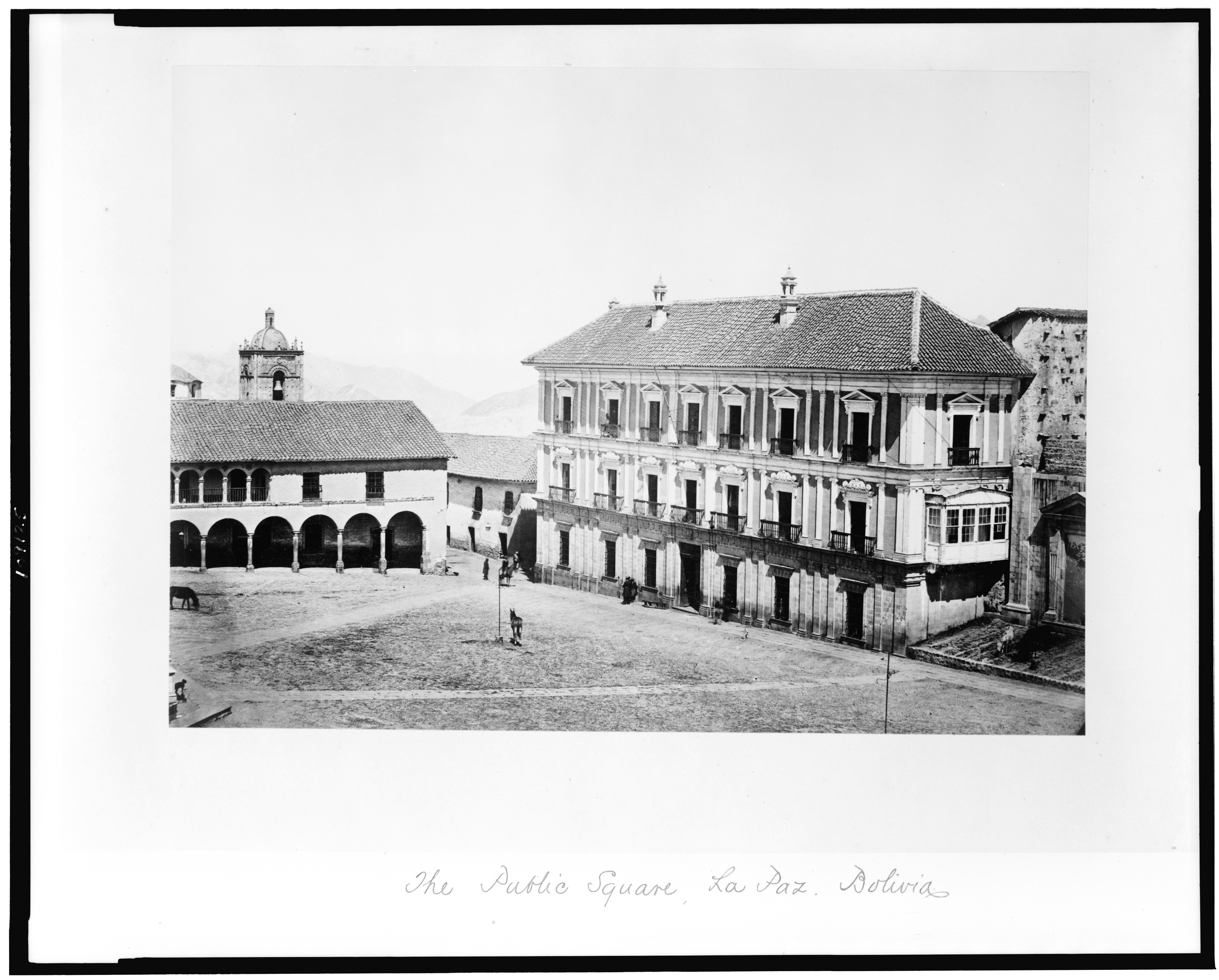
The Government Palace of La Paz in the 1860s.

The uprising in La Paz, staged by Quevedo's allies, was also quelled. Miguel Aguirre and Belisario Antezana rose in revolt soon after and recruited the leader of the Montoneros, Rufino Carrasco. They occupied Cochabamba with ease, leading to mass defections by the garrison of that city. Ultimately, Aguirre and Antezana counted with 500 men. They, however, lacked equipment and planned to sack the municipal branch of the Banco Nacional in Cochabamba, taking as much as 40,000 pesos. In Oruro, the revolution had been ended by Eliodoro Camacho, leading to Frías' decision to march on Cochabamba regardless of his inferior numbers. It was during his march to Cochabamba that yet another revolution exploded in La Paz, where Ministers Calvo and Baptista, alongside Colonel Juan Granier, had been left in charge. An attack on the Government Palace of La Paz was expected, leading to the fortification of the building by government forces. On 20 March, at 10:00, revolutionaries gathered in the remote outskirts of the city, and began to march upon the main plaza. Daniel Nuñez del Prado, head of the police at the time, gathered some men to defend the San Francisco square, suffering a total and complete defeat. Led by Colonels Carlos Resini and Modesto Moscoso, a massive mob fought ferociously for eight hours against the government forces barricaded in the Palace. By midnight, Colonel Manuel Othón Jofré attempted to break the siege, however, the charge failed and ended with the Colonel seriously injured.

At 14:00, part of the police defected to the revolutionaries, allowing for the rebels to advance toward the Cathedral Basilica of Our Lady of Peace and closer to the palace. Hoping to smoke out the entrenched defenders, Colonel Resini attempted to burn the palace eight times. Although the first seven times failed to set the building on fire, the eighth attempt sparked a fire which burnt the wooden beams underneath the roof tiles, causing a massive fire. By 15:00, the third floor was completely engulfed in flames; by 17:00, the second floor was consumed by the fire. Hours earlier, Colonel Granier had been informed of the assault, and had begun his march on the city. Around 18:00, Granier's troops had entered La Paz, at which time Calvo and Baptista had chosen to arm themselves and, alongside a small group, opened the gates and fire upon the enemies. The small group made its way to the Monastery of the Concepcionistas, seeking refuge, sustaining heavy fire and losing a few men. Rushing into the main plaza, the revolutionaries claimed victory, only to be surprised by Granier and his men. The rebels were defeated, bringing an end to the bloody and ferocious combat which had ensued for hours. The next day, 130 bodies were recovered. The burning of the Government Palace of La Paz gave it its current name. A letter which confirms the events of that day was sent from Colonel Resini to the Bishop of La Paz, Juan de Dios Bosque, and it reads as follows:

Illustrious Bishop. — There is a deep commotion in the city. The prelate cannot be indifferent to such a horrible manifestation. Your evangelical mission is to intervene and to put an end to so many deaths. It has been decided to burn down the palace; the situation demands it. A note from you, forcing the resisting troops in the palace to surrender, will end the chaos. To work for charity. Your attentive S. S. — Carlos Resini.

Frías continued his march on Cochabamba, sieging and attacking the enemy barricades outside the city. The following day, the rebel forces, led by Generals Gonzalo García Lanza and Gregorio Pérez, attempted to break the siege by taking Frías by surprise and engage in direct combat. However, they were repelled, defeated, and completely dispersed. The President then entered the city triumphantly and declared the victory of the constitutionalist cause. In order to ensure the end of the revolution, Frías marched to Oruro to put down the last revolt, ending Quevedo's revolution.

=== Daza's coup (1876) ===
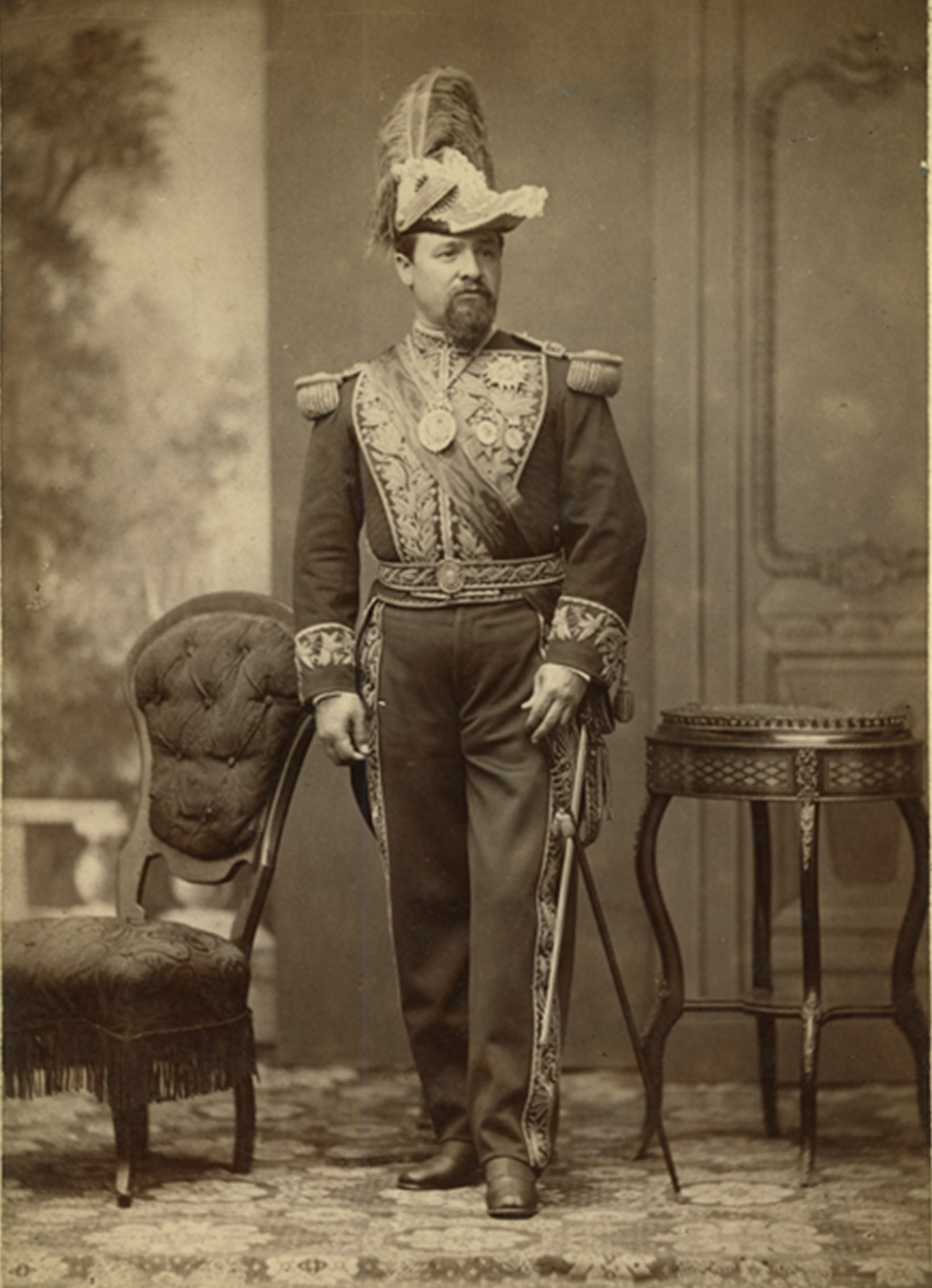
General Hilarión Daza in full presidential regalia.

With elections in the horizon, politicians began preparing for their respective campaign trails. Among the most prominent candidates were General Hilarión Daza and Belisario Salinas. Daza had assumed that the government would support his candidature, and if not, then that of Salinas. He was mistaken, as Frías refused to endorse any candidate. Daza was irate, not only because of the aforementioned fact, but also because he had been replaced as Minister of War by Eliodoro Camacho. Nonetheless, Daza controlled the army and his support grew exponentially. There were numerous rumors of a conspiracy which was unfolding against the government, and the administration was well aware. Fearing the worst, Frías sent a memorandum to the garrisons throughout the country ensuring their loyalty and securing equipment in case Daza did launch a coup. The memorandum was intercepted by Daza, who was furious after reading the contents. Regardless of this incident, Daza pledged his allegiance to the government, referring to Frías as his "father".

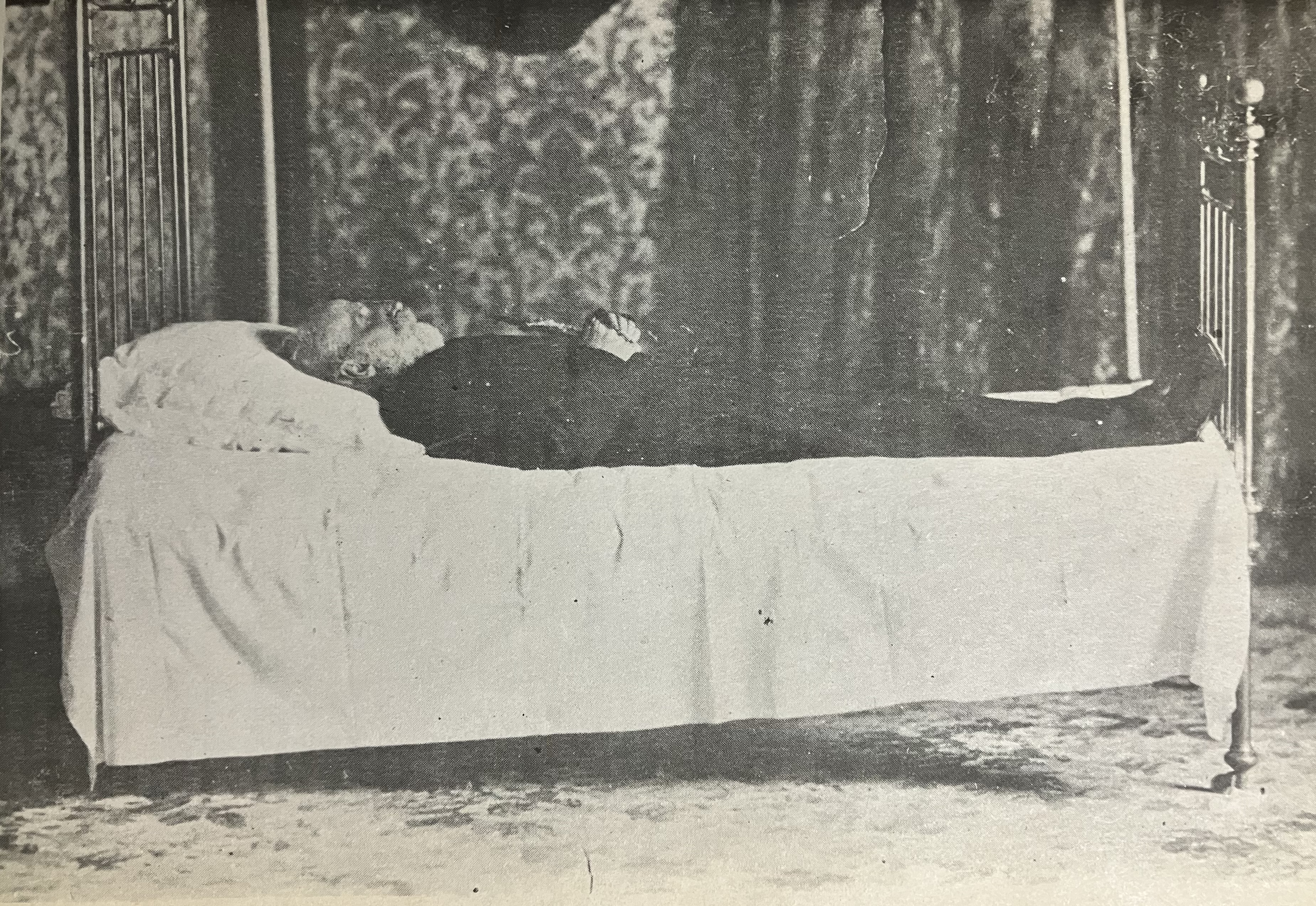
Tomás Frías on his deathbed in Florence, Italy (May 1884).

On 4 May 1876, Jorge Oblitas, a candidate in the elections, renounced his candidature, hastily meeting with Daza in his home, declaring he would support a coup against the government. Thus, the revolution started, with the government either frozen or impartial about the events. With the threat of an attack on the Government Palace in Sucre, Frías and his ministers were determined to remain inside and stand their ground. At 11:30, military trumpets and drums began to play outside the Palace, with sentinels being sent to block every exit. All of this for the imprisonment of four unarmed civilians. Frías tried to exit the building, only to be stopped by a sentinel. When stopped, Frías uttered the words: "I know you for some time now; you have known me; I am the president". After a long silence, a group of soldiers began to chant: "Long live the President of the Republic!", to which Frías replied: "That is me!". Immediately after this, an even louder cheer came from outside: "Long live General Daza!". Then, the sentinels at the door crossed their bayonets on Frías' chest, after which the president withdrew to his desk. Eventually, all ministers and the President were separated and guarded individually for the rest of the night. The next day, 5 May, all ministers were released except for Daniel Calvo and Mariano Baptista. Agustín Aspiazu, who had been appointed by Frías as Minister of War only recently, was allowed to leave since he was allied to Daza and had participated in the coup. Frías was then relocated to the Recoleta Convent, where President Pedro Blanco had been murdered decades earlier during a coup. After the seizure of power was complete, Frías was allowed to leave in exile, heading to Arequipa. There, he planned revolts in Cobija and Cochabamba. However, Daza had consolidated his power, forcing Frías to accept defeat and flee to Europe.

== Exile, death, and legacy ==
=== Post-presidency and last years ===
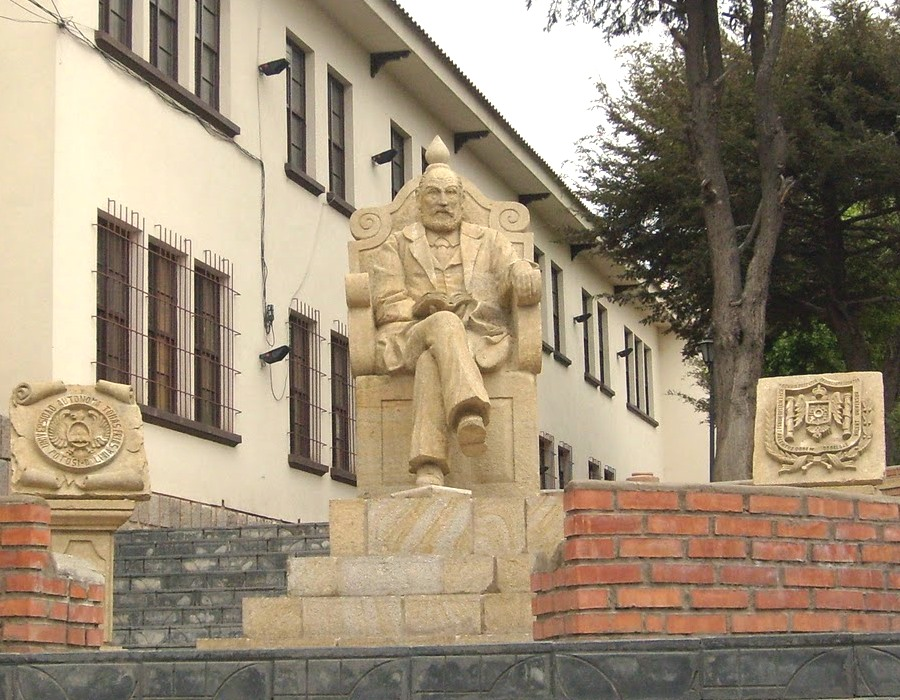
Statue erected in memory of Frías in front of the Tomás Frías Autonomous University.

When the War of the Pacific began, Frías offered his services and was given the position of Minister Plenipotentiary to France. Once in Paris, he asked for a wage cut in order to support the war effort. Once his services had concluded, he retired to Florence and spent the rest of his days there. It is said that, sensing his death, he asked the manager of the hotel he lived in to prepare a warm bath for him. After washing, he is said to have uttered: "Now let us wait for death". He died on 10 May 1884. Days after his death, his remains were transported back to Bolivia and were buried in his native Potosí.

=== Memorialization ===
Frías had a strong impact in Bolivian history and, for his important role in the development of Bolivia's education system, the Tomás Frías Autonomous University is named after him. Officially created by the Supreme Decree issued on 15 October 1892, it was initially known as the University of Potosí. However, where the university stood, a Free Faculty of Law had already been operating in 1876, subordinated to the Chancellery of Chuquisaca. On 30 November 1892, a regulatory decree was issued providing that the departments of Potosí and Oruro were independent of the Chancellery of Chuquisaca and La Paz respectively. On 3 February 1893, the University Council of Potosi was installed, under the leadership of chancellor and president Nicanor Careaga. By an act issued on 29 November 1924 (enacted on 2 December 1924) by President Bautista Saavedra, the University of Potosí changed its name to "bear the name of an eminent intellectual born in Potosí, Dr. Tomás Frías Ametller", recognizing his contribution to the organization of Bolivian universities.

On 4 October 1895, Presidente Mariano Baptista honored Frías by naming the Tomás Frías Province after him. In the law issued that date, Baptista refers to Frías as "an illustrious statesman".

== See also ==
- Cabinet of Tomás Frías I
- Cabinet of Tomás Frías II

Political offices
Preceded by Office established	Minister of Public Instruction; 1839–1840	Succeeded by Manuel Sánchez de Velasco
Vacant Title last held by Miguel María de Aguirre	Minister of Finance; 1841	Succeeded by Miguel María de Aguirre
Preceded by Manuel Molina	Minister of Finance; 1844	Succeeded by Miguel María de Aguirre
Preceded by Manuel de la Cruz Méndez	Minister of Public Instruction and Foreign Affairs; 1844–1847	Succeeded by Domingo Delgadillo
Preceded by Pedro José de Guerra	Minister of the Interior; Acting; 1847	Succeeded by Basilio Cuéllar
Preceded by Miguel María de Aguirre	Minister of Finance; 1847–1848	Vacant Title next held by Andrés María Torrico; Acting
Vacant Title last held by Miguel María de Aguirre	Minister of Finance; 1857–1858	Succeeded by Himself
Preceded by Himself	Minister of Finance and Foreign Affairs; 1858–1861	Vacant Title next held by Juan José Ibargüen
Vacant Title last held by Manuel de la Lastra	Minister of Finance; 1871	Succeeded by Casimiro Corral; Acting
Vacant Juan de Dios Bosque; Acting Title last held by Agustín Morales	President of Bolivia; 1872–1873	Succeeded by Adolfo Ballivián
Preceded by Adolfo Ballivián	President of Bolivia; 1874–1876	Succeeded by Hilarión Daza
