= Adolfo Ballivián =

18th president of Bolivia

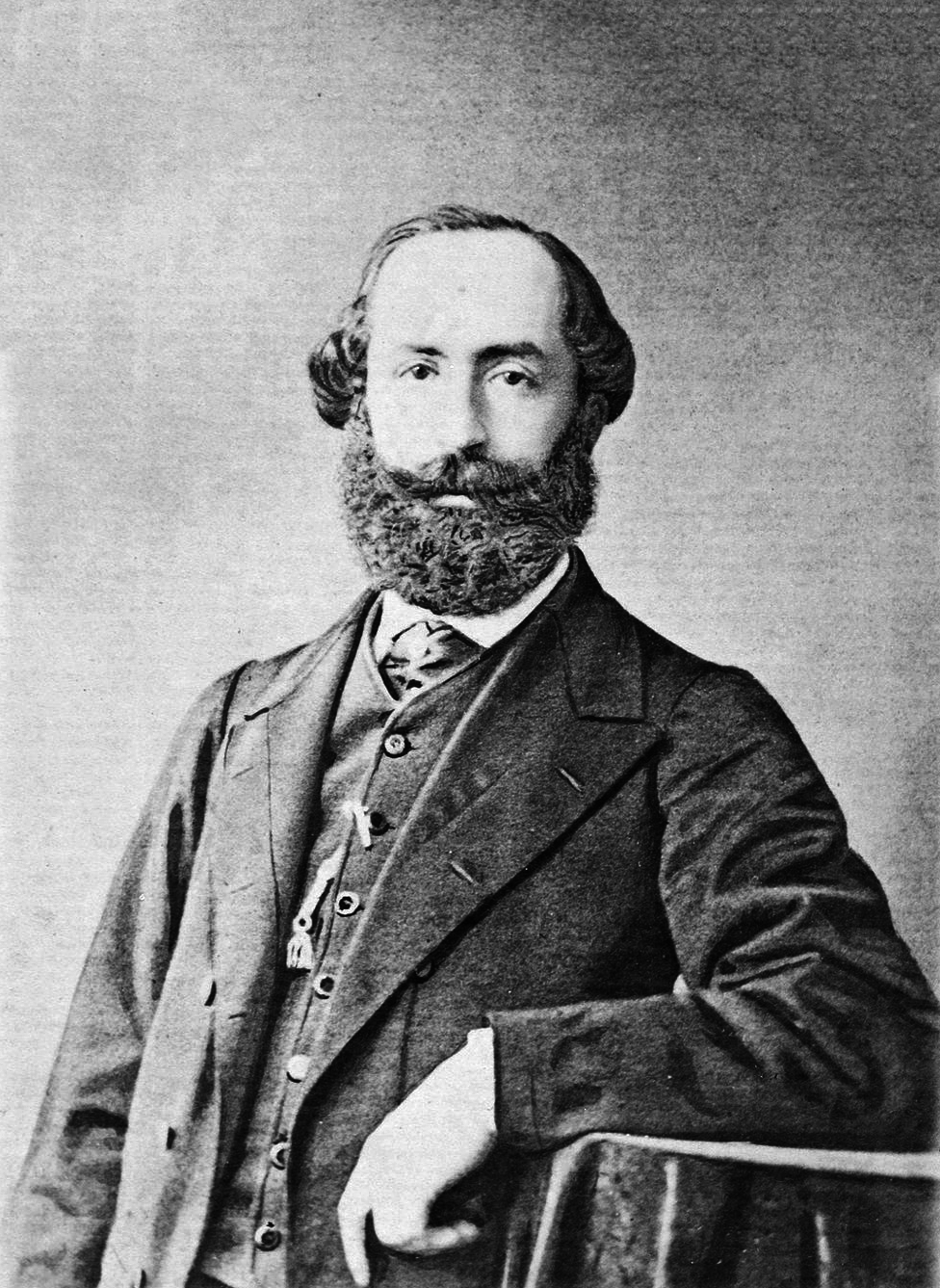
- Daguerreotype of Adolfo Ballivián in 1874 by Nicolás Acosta.

18th President of Bolivia
- In office 9 May 1873 – 14 February 1874
- Preceded by: Tomás Frías
- Succeeded by: Tomás Frías

Personal details
- Born: Adolfo Ballivián Coll; 15 November 1831 La Paz, Bolivia
- Died: 14 February 1874 (aged 42) La Paz, Bolivia
- Cause of death: Stomach cancer
- Party: Red Party
- Spouse: Carmen Grimwood Allende
- Parent(s): José Ballivián; Mercedes Coll

Military service
- Allegiance: Bolivia
- Branch/service: Bolivian Army
- Rank: Lieutenant colonel
- Battles/wars: Battle of Ingavi

Adolfo Ballivián Coll (15 November 1831 – 14 February 1874) was a Bolivian military officer and politician who served as the 18th president of Bolivia from 1873 to 1874. His presidency was brief, yet serious financial and legislative problems, worsened or neglected by previous administrations, began to appear. These had serious effects for Bolivia, leading up to the War of the Pacific.

== Early life ==
=== Youth and first exile ===
Adolfo Ballivián was born on November 15, 1831, in the city of La Paz, Bolivia. He was the son of former Bolivian president and war hero José Ballivián. Highly educated, he had the opportunity to travel to many places. He was a member of the armed forces, orator, composer of classical music, writer, and deputy.

From a very young age he accompanied his father in the War of the Confederation and also participated in the Battle of Ingavi. During his first trips, living in exile with his father, he met Carmen Grimwood Allende de Quillota in Valparaíso, Chile, whom he married.

=== Early political career and second exile ===
Following his father's unexpected death in Brazil in 1852, he returned to Bolivia, rejoined the army and rose to the rank of lieutenant colonel. He ran for Congress and also became a part-time journalist, serving as aide-de-camp to José María Linares. Between 1862 and 1864 he participated as a representative in the National Assembly, and was exiled from the country after the triumph of Mariano Melgarejo over José María de Achá. He was to spend seven years in exile and only returned to Bolivia after the death of President Agustín Morales.

== Return to Bolivia ==
=== Third exile and the death of Morales ===
He returned to Europe when relations between President Morales and Congress and civil society deteriorated in 1872. However, Morales was weary of Ballivián's presence in the country and sent him away on a diplomatic mission to Europe in May of that year. He was still in Europe when his name was invoked by congressional forces and constitutionalists to participate as a candidate in the 1873 elections, which had been quickly called after the unexpected assassination of President Morales. Tomás Frías, who had assumed the presidency by virtue of his position as the president of the Council of State, refused to finish the constitutional term and called elections.

=== The General Elections of 1873 ===
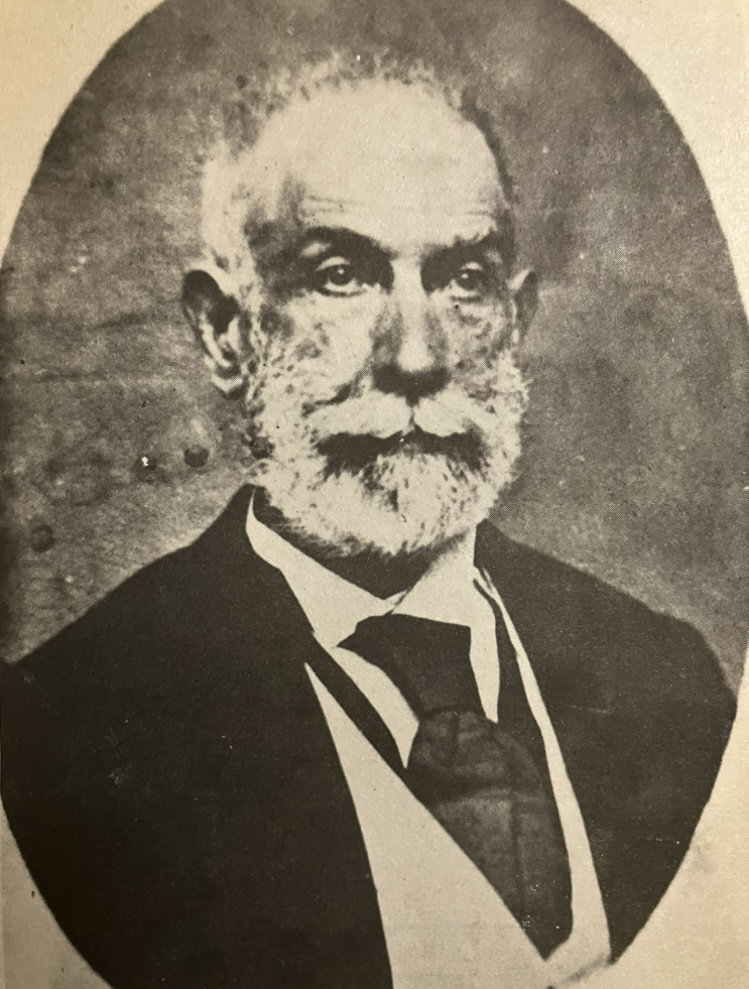
Frías was president after the death of Morales.

During the General Elections of 1873, Adolfo Ballivián, Casimiro Corral and Quintín Quevedo were the most prominent candidates. While the first two candidates represented their own constitutional faction, Quevedo represented the old melgarejista interests. This faction hoped to retake the lands which had been repatriated to its previous owners, seized by the government of Melgarejo and bestowed to his loyal allies. The top three candidates of the elections were Ballivián, Corral, and Quevedo, receiving 6,442, 5,352, and 3,313 votes respectively. There was a total of 16,674 votes, and none of the candidates achieved the majority necessary according to the Constitution, meaning that the National Assembly was now tasked to choose among the three candidates with the most votes. The first round concluded in 31 votes for Ballivián, 20 for Corral, and 6 for Quevedo. The second round, contested between Ballivián and Corral ended with the former obtaining 41 votes and the latter 19. Thus, Ballivián defeated both Corral and Quevedo and was proclaimed President of Bolivia. Both Corral and Quevedo, as they had promised prior to their respective candidatures, accepted and acknowledged the victor of the elections as the legitimate successor to the presidency. In the 1873 Bolivian general election, he was elected president. The elections have been characterized as the first free and fair elections in Bolivian history. Interestingly, Ballivián had been elected while he was still in Europe, only returning to Bolivia on April 21, 1873. By this time, the electoral question had been answered and Frías was ready to hand over the executive power to him.

== President of Bolivia ==
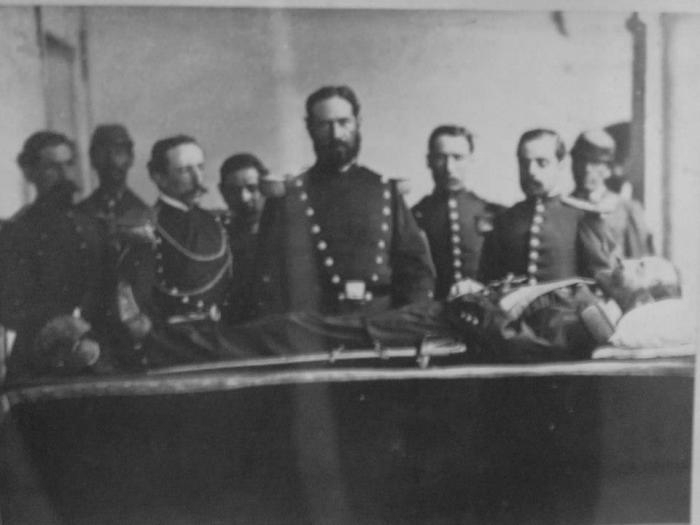
Ballivián lying in state after his death from stomach cancer.

Ballivián enjoyed a short "honeymoon" period and then faced the usual obstructionist opposition from politicians that was typical of those times. It also didn't help that his short presidential term coincided with a global drop in silver prices, which was Bolivia's most important export product at the time, along with tin. It was in this context that Congress denied Ballivián his urgent request to buy two new warships from Europe to equip the precarious, practically non-existent Bolivian Navy. This was a major concern due to challenges to Bolivian sovereignty over its Litoral emanating from Chile. This congressional rejection would be much lamented later by Bolivians when the War of the Pacific finally erupted in 1879. The fiscal and financial troubles of the country bothered him greatly; however, with his weakening health, he was forced to give Frías the executive power on January 31, 1874.

=== Sudden death ===
By February of 1874, it was discovered that President Ballivián suffered from stomach cancer just months after coming to power, and died on February 14, 1874. An account of his death is described as follows:

At eight o'clock, in the morning of February 14, a friend begged the family doctor to specify the prognosis. As agreed, to satisfy the patient's religious dispositions, the doctor replied: "I request a private meeting of colleagues, summon them"... The bishop-elect of La Paz was informed about the President's condition, as indicated by the doctor; being certain that he or the prelate would come at the appointed time. At eleven o'clock, the doctor, and a friend took Ballivián into their arms. They shook his head and asked him: "What do you want, sir?" Ballivián answered: "To die".

Soon thereafter, Ballivián died, held by his doctor and one of his dear friends. He was replaced by the president of the Council of State, the same Tomás Frías who had transferred the presidency to him only nine months prior, and had already been exercising the executive power since January 31.

Political offices
Preceded by Tomás Frías	President of Bolivia; 1873–1874	Succeeded by Tomás Frías
