= Guillermo Jiménez =

Guillermo Jiménez may refer to:

- Guillermo Jiménez Gallo (1913–1996), Bolivian soldier and politician, served in First Cabinet of Hugo Banzer
- Guillermo Jiménez Leal, (born 1947), Venezuelan singer, musician and poet
- Guillermo Jiménez Morales (born 1933), Mexican lawyer and politician, governor of Puebla in 1981–1987
