= Cabinet of Jorge Córdova =

Bolivian presidential administration and ministerial cabinet from 1855 to 1857

Cabinet of Jorge Córdova Córdova Cabinet
- 23rd Cabinet of the Bolivian Republic
- 1855–1857
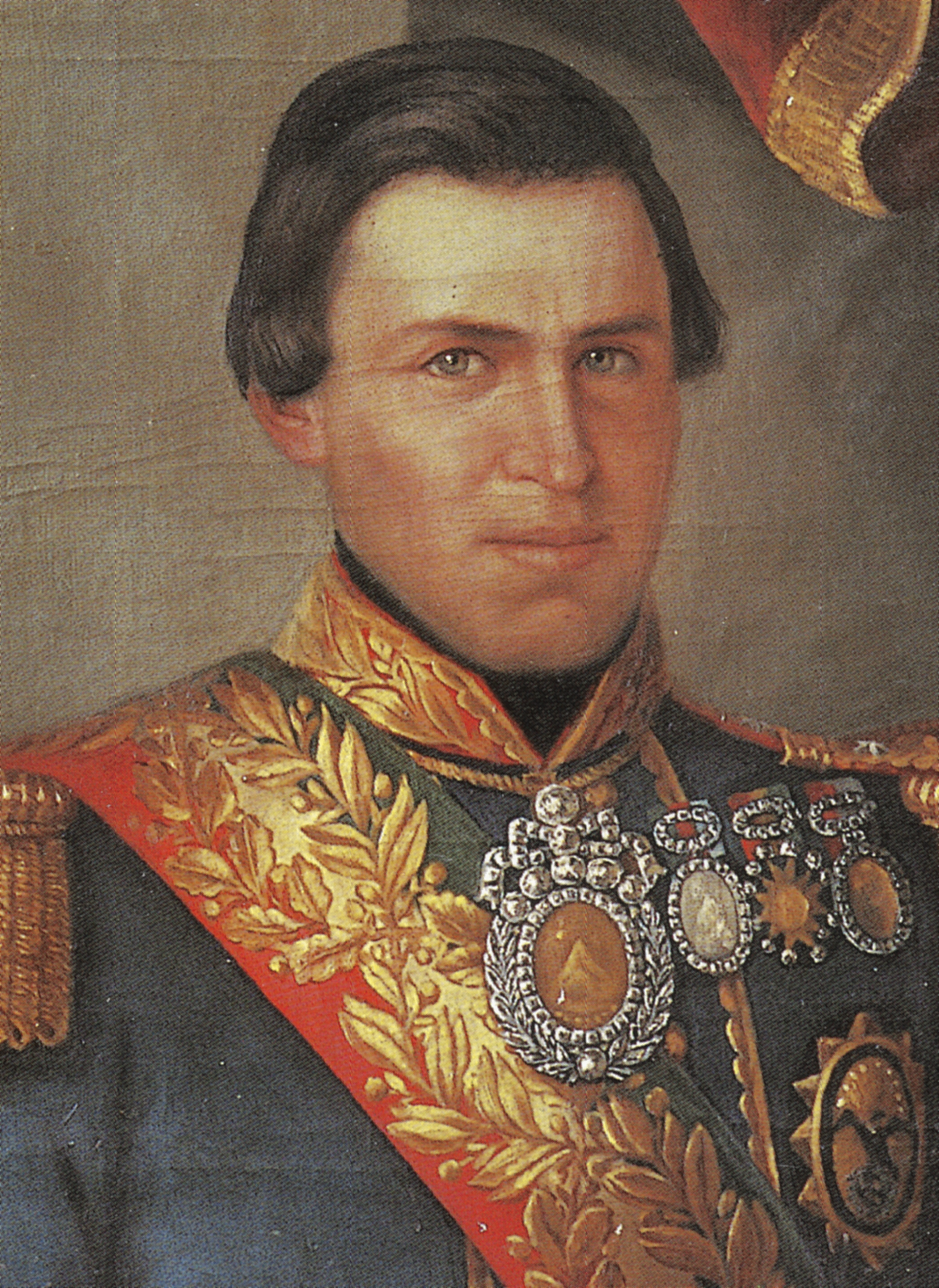
- Date formed: 17 August 1855
- Date dissolved: 9 September 1857 (2 years, 3 weeks and 2 days)

People and organisations
- President: Jorge Córdova
- No. of ministers: 4

History
- Election: 1855 general election
- Predecessor: Cabinet of Manuel Isidoro Belzu
- Successor: Cabinet of José María Linares

The Córdova Cabinet constituted the 23rd cabinet of the Bolivian Republic. It was formed on 17 August 1855, 2 days after Jorge Córdova was sworn-in as the 12th president of Bolivia following the 1855 general election, succeeding the Belzu Cabinet. It was dissolved on 9 September 1857 upon Córdova's overthrow in a coup d'état and was succeeded by the Cabinet of José María Linares.

== Composition ==
Portfolio	Minister	Party	Prof.	Took office	Left office	Term	Ref.
President	Jorge Córdova	Mil.	Mil.	15 August 1855	9 September 1857	756	
Minister General (Note: Exerts command of all ministerial portfolios, except war, while the respective ministries are organized.)	Juan de la Cruz Benavente	Ind.	Law.	15 August 1855	17 August 1855	2	
Minister of the Interior and Worship	Basilio Cuéllar	Ind.	Law.	17 August 1855	9 September 1857	754	
Minister of War	José María Pérez de Urdininea	Mil.	Mil.	15 August 1855	9 September 1857	756	(Note: Ex-president N° 03.)
Minister of Finance and Material Police	Miguel María de Aguirre	Ind.	Eco.	17 August 1855	9 September 1857	754	
Minister of Public Instruction and Foreign Affairs	Juan de la Cruz Benavente	Ind.	Law.	8 November 1854	9 September 1857	1,036	(Note: Belzu + Córdova.)

== History ==
Upon his assumption to office, Córdova charged all ministerial portfolios to Juan de la Cruz Benavente as minister general pending the formation of a proper ministerial cabinet. De la Cruz had already been serving as minister of public instruction and foreign affairs in the cabinet of Manuel Isidoro Belzu since 8 November 1854. A full council of ministers was appointed on 17 August 1855, two days later, composed of four ministers. In this cabinet, a new department, material police, was established as part of the Ministry of Finance.

One ex-president, José María Pérez de Urdininea (1828) was a member of this cabinet.

=== Cabinets ===
N°	Formed	Days	Decree
I	17 August 1855	754	Supreme Decree 17-08-1855

=== Structural changes ===
Portfolio	Part of	Transferred to	Date	Decree
Police	None	Ministry of Finance	17 August 1855	Supreme Decree 17-08-1855
