= Ministry of Government (Bolivia) =

Government ministry of Bolivia

- Incumbent; Roberto Ríos since 20 May 2025
- Member of: Cabinet
- Reports to: President of Bolivia
- Seat: La Paz
- Appointer: President of Bolivia
- Precursor: Ministry of the Interior
- Formation: 13 January 1826; 200 years ago
- First holder: Facundo Infante
- Deputy: Vice Ministry of Internal Regime and Police; Vice Ministry of Citizen Security; Vice Ministry of Social Defense and Controlled Substances
- Website: www.mingobierno.gob.bo/index.php/

The Ministry of Government (Spanish: Ministerio de Gobierno) is a ministry of the Plurinational State of Bolivia. It is tasked with regulating public policy. The current Minister of Government is Roberto Ríos since 20 May 2025.

== List of ministers ==
No.	Portfolio		Minister	Party	Prof.	Term	Days	N.C	P.C	President(s)	Note		
1	Government	Finance	Facundo Infante	Mil.	Mil.	13 January 1826 – 12 August 1828	942	2	1	Sucre	(Note: Creation of the Ministry of Government and the Ministry of Finance.) (Note: Spaniard.)		
1	Government	Finance	Facundo Infante	Mil.	Mil.	13 January 1826 – 12 August 1828	942	3	2	Sucre	(Note: Creation of the Ministry of Government and the Ministry of Finance.) (Note: Spaniard.)		
1	Government	Finance	Facundo Infante	Mil.	Mil.	13 January 1826 – 12 August 1828	942	3	2	Pérez	(Note: Creation of the Ministry of Government and the Ministry of Finance.) (Note: Spaniard.)		
2	Interior	Foreign Affairs	Casimiro Olañeta	Ind.	Law.	12 August 1828 – 1 February 1829	173	4	1	Velasco			
2	Interior	Foreign Affairs	Casimiro Olañeta	Ind.	Law.	12 August 1828 – 1 February 1829	173	4	1	Blanco Soto			
2	Interior	Foreign Affairs	Casimiro Olañeta	Ind.	Law.	12 August 1828 – 1 February 1829	173	4	1	Velasco			
3	Interior	Foreign Affairs	Mariano del Callejo	Ind.	Law.	1 February 1829 – 24 May 1829	112	4	1	Velasco			
Office vacant 24 May 1829 – 3 July 1829									16	5	1	Santa Cruz	
4	Interior	Foreign Affairs	Mariano Enrique Calvo	Ind.	Law.	3 July 1829 – 24 January 1832	935	(Note: Vice President No. 3, President #8.)		5	1	Santa Cruz	
–	Interior	Foreign Affairs	Casimiro Olañeta	Ind.	Law.	24 January 1832 – 25 January 1833	367	6	2			Santa Cruz	
–	Interior	Foreign Affairs	Mariano Enrique Calvo	Ind.	Law.	25 January 1833 – 16 August 1835	933	6	2			Santa Cruz	
5	Interior	Foreign Affairs	José Ignacio Sanjines	Ind.	Law.	16 August 1835 – 11 December 1837	848	7	3			Santa Cruz	
Office vacant 11 December 1837 – 28 March 1838									107	8	4	Santa Cruz	
–	Government	Foreign Affairs	Casimiro Olañeta	Ind.	Law.	28 March 1838 – 22 February 1839	331	(Note: Minister of the Peru–Bolivian Confederation.)		8	4	Santa Cruz	
6	Interior	Foreign Affairs	Manuel María de Urcullu	Ind.	Law.	22 February 1839 – 16 November 1839	267	9	1	Velasco	(Note: Minister General until 27 March 1839.)		
7	Interior	Foreign Affairs	José María Linares	Ind.	Law.	16 November 1839 – 10 June 1841	572	10	2	Velasco	(Note: President #13.)		
Office vacant 10 June 1841 – 18 October 1841									130	–	–	Ágreda	
Office vacant 10 June 1841 – 18 October 1841									130	–	–	Calvo	
Office vacant 10 June 1841 – 18 October 1841									130	–	–	Vacant	
Office vacant 10 June 1841 – 18 October 1841									130	11	1	Ballivián	
–	Interior	Foreign Affairs	Manuel María de Urcullu	Ind.	Law.	18 October 1841 – 25 April 1842	189			11	1	Ballivián	
–	Interior	Foreign Affairs	Casimiro Olañeta	Ind.	Law.	25 April 1842 – 25 June 1842	61	12	2			Ballivián	
8	Interior	Foreign Affairs	Manuel de la Cruz Mendez	Ind.	Law.	25 June 1842 – 4 November 1842	132	12	2			Ballivián	
9	Interior		Eusebio Gutierrez	Ind.	Law.	4 November 1842 – 19 June 1843	380	13	3			Ballivián	
10	Interior		Pedro Buitrago	Ind.	Law.	19 June 1843 – 9 August 1845	782	14	4			Ballivián	
11	Interior		Pedro José; Domingo de Guerra	Ind.	Mag.	9 August 1845 – 25 November 1847	838	14	4			Ballivián	
12	Interior		José Ugarte	Ind.	Law.	25 November 1847 – 23 December 1847	28	14	4			Ballivián	
13	Interior		Basilio Cuéllar	Ind.	Law.	23 December 1847 – 2 January 1848	10	15	1	Guilarte			
Office vacant 2 January 1848 – 18 January 1848									16	–	–	Vacant	
–	Interior	Foreign Affairs	Casimiro Olañeta	Ind.	Law.	18 January 1848 – 6 December 1848	323	16	1	Velasco	(Note: Minister General until 4 February 1848.)		
14	Interior	Foreign Affairs	Manuel José de Asín	Ind.	Law.	6 December 1848 – 9 June 1849	185	17	1	Belzu			
15	Interior	Foreign Affairs	Tomás Baldivieso	Ind.	Law.	9 June 1849 – 25 September 1851	838	18	2	Belzu			
16	Interior	Foreign Affairs	Juan Crisóstomo Unzueta	Ind.	Law.	25 September 1851 – 11 July 1852	382	19	3	Belzu			
Office vacant 11 July 1852 – 14 July 1852									3	Belzu	–	–	
17	Interior		Rudecindo Carvajal	Ind.	Law.	14 July 1852 – 6 July 1853	357	20	4	Belzu			
18	Interior	Worship	José Joaquín de Aguirre	Ind.	Law.	6 July 1853 – 15 August 1855	770	21	5	Belzu			
Office vacant 15 August 1855 – 17 August 1855									2	23	1	Córdova	
–	Interior	Worship	Basilio Cuéllar	Ind.	Law.	17 August 1855 – 9 September 1857	754			23	1	Córdova	
19	Government	Wor.	Ruperto Fernández	Ind.	Law.	9 September 1857 – 14 January 1861	1,223	24	1	Linares	(Note: Argentine.) (Note: Creation of the Office of Justice.)		
Office vacant 14 January 1861 – 21 January 1861									7	25	1	Junta	
20	Government	Justice	Manuel Morris	Ind.	Law.	21 January 1861 – 4 May 1861	103			25	1	Junta	
Office vacant 4 May 1861 – 17 May 1861									13	26	1	Achá	
–	Interior	Justice	Ruperto Fernández	Ind.	Law.	17 May 1861 – 29 November 1861	196			26	1	Achá	
21	Foreign Affairs	Gov.	Manuel Macedonia Salinas	Ind.	Law.	29 November 1861 – 18 October 1862	323	27	2	(Note: Becomes office under the Ministry of Foreign Affairs.)		Achá	
22	Government	Wor.	Lucas Mendoza de la Tapia	Ind.	Law.	18 October 1862 – 22 December 1862	65	27	2	(Note: Reinstated as independent ministry.)		Achá	
23	Government	Jus.	Juan de la Cruz Benavente	Ind.	Law.	22 December 1862 – 30 March 1863	98	27	2			Achá	
24	Foreign Affairs	Gov.	Rafael Bustillo	Ind.	Law.	30 March 1863 – 28 December 1864	639	28	4			Achá	
Office vacant 28 December 1864 – 29 December 1864									1	–	–	Melgarejo	
25	Foreign Affairs	Gov.	Mariano Donato Muñoz	Ind.	Law.	29 December 1864 – 15 January 1871	2,208	29	1	(Note: Minister General until 19 June 1867.)		Melgarejo	
25	Foreign Affairs	Gov.	Mariano Donato Muñoz	Ind.	Law.	29 December 1864 – 15 January 1871	2,208	30	2	(Note: Minister General until 19 June 1867.)		Melgarejo	
Office vacant 15 January 1871 – 25 January 1871									10	–	–	Morales	
26	Foreign Affairs	Government	Casimiro Corral	PC	Law.	25 January 1871 – 27 January 1873	733	31	1	(Note: Minister General until 22 June 1871.)		Morales	
26	Foreign Affairs	Government	Casimiro Corral	PC	Law.	25 January 1871 – 27 January 1873	733	32	2	(Note: Minister General until 22 June 1871.)		Morales	
26	Foreign Affairs	Government	Casimiro Corral	PC	Law.	25 January 1871 – 27 January 1873	733	32	2	(Note: Minister General until 22 June 1871.)	Frías		
27	Foreign Affairs	Government	Melchor Terrazas	Ind.	Law.	27 January 1873 – 9 May 1873	102	33	1		Frías		
28	Foreign Affairs	Government	Mariano Baptista	Ind.	Law.	9 May 1873 – 4 May 1876	1,091	34	1	Ballivián	(Note: First Vice President No. 6, President #23.)		
28	Foreign Affairs	Government	Mariano Baptista	Ind.	Law.	9 May 1873 – 4 May 1876	1,091	35	2	Frías	(Note: First Vice President No. 6, President #23.)		
29	Foreign Affairs	Government	Jorge Oblitas	PC	Law.	4 May 1876 – 17 August 1877	470	36	1	Daza	(Note: Second Vice President #7.)		
30	Foreign Affairs	Government	José Manuel del Carpio	PC	Law.	17 August 1877 – 27 May 1878	283	37	2	Daza	(Note: First Vice President #8.)		
31	Foreign Affairs	Government	Martín Lanza	Ind.	Law.	27 May 1878 – 7 February 1879	256	37	2	Daza			
32	Foreign Affairs	Government	Serapio Reyes Ortiz	PC	Law.	7 February 1879 – 28 December 1879	324	37	2	Daza	(Note: Second Vice President #9.)		
Office vacant 28 December 1879 – 20 January 1880									23	–	–	Vacant	
Office vacant 28 December 1879 – 20 January 1880									23	–	–	Campero	
–	General		Ladislao Cabrera	Mil.	Mil.	20 January 1880 – 15 April 1880	86	38	1	(Note: Minister General throughout term.)		Campero	
33	Foreign Affairs	Government	Jenaro Sanjinés	PC	Law.	15 April 1880 – 20 June 1880	66	38	1	(Note: Second Vice President #12.)		Campero	
34	Foreign Affairs	Government	Juan Crisóstomo Carrillo	PL	Law.	20 June 1880 – 18 December 1880	181	39	2			Campero	
35	Foreign Affairs	Government	Belisario Boeto	PC	Law.	18 December 1880 – 14 January 1881	27	39	2			Campero	
36	Foreign Affairs	Gov.	Daniel Nuñez del Prado	Ind.	Dr.	14 January 1881 – 4 August 1881	202	40	3			Campero	
37	Foreign Affairs	Government	Pedro José Zilveti	PL	Law.	4 August 1881 – 10 December 1882	493	41	4			Campero	
38	Foreign Affairs	Government	Antonio Quijarro	–	Law.	10 December 1882 – 24 February 1884	441	42	5			Campero	
39	Foreign Affairs	Government	Nataniel Aguirre	Ind.	Law.	24 February 1884 – 4 September 1884	193	42	5			Campero	
40	Government	Worship	Macedonio Doria Medina	PC	Law	4 September 1884 – 5 December 1885	457	43	1	Pacheco			
–	Government	Industry	José Manuel del Carpio	PC	Law.	5 December 1885 – 23 November 1887	718	44	2	Pacheco			
–	Government	Industry	José Manuel del Carpio	PC	Law.	5 December 1885 – 23 November 1887	718	45	3	Pacheco			
41	Government	Post and Telegraph	José Valerio Aldunate	–	Law.	23 November 1887 – 23 October 1888	335	46	4	Pacheco	(Note: Creation of the Office of Post and Telegraph.)		
41	Government	Post and Telegraph	José Valerio Aldunate	–	Law.	23 November 1887 – 23 October 1888	335	47	1	Arce	(Note: Creation of the Office of Post and Telegraph.)		
42	Gov.	P.T.	Telmo Ichaso	–	Law.	23 October 1888 – 11 August 1892	1,388	47	1	Arce			
Office vacant 11 August 1892 – 17 August 1892									6	–		–	Baptista
43	Government	Colonization	Luis Paz	–	Law.	17 August 1892 – 22 May 1895	1,008	49	1				Baptista
–	Government	Justice	Macedonio Doria Medina	PC	Law	22 May 1895 – 19 August 1896	455	50	2				Baptista
–	Government	Justice	Jenaro Sanjinés	PC	Law.	19 August 1896 – 28 November 1898	831	51	1	Fernández	(Note: Second Vice President No. 12 (in office).)		
44	Government	Jus.	Manuel O. Jofré	–	Law.	28 November 1898 – 12 April 1899	135	52	2	Fernández			
–	All ministries		José Manuel Pando	PL	Mil.	12 April 1899 – 25 October 1899	196	53	1	Junta	(Note: The Government Junta exercised the different ministerial portfolios jointly simultaneously.)		
–	All ministries		Serapio Reyes Ortiz	PL	Law.	12 April 1899 – 25 October 1899	196	53	1	Junta	(Note: The Government Junta exercised the different ministerial portfolios jointly simultaneously.)		
–	All ministries		Macario Pinilla Vargas	PL	Law.	12 April 1899 – 25 October 1899	196	53	1	Junta	(Note: The Government Junta exercised the different ministerial portfolios jointly simultaneously.)		
Office vacant 25 October 1899 – 27 October 1899									2	–	–	Pando	
45	Government	Justice	Carlos V. Romero	PL	Law.	27 October 1899 – 12 April 1901	532	54	1			Pando	
46	Government	Jus.	Aníbal Capriles Cabrera	PL	Law.	12 April 1901 – 19 March 1902	341	55	2	(Note: Second Vice President #13.)		Pando	
47	Government	Justice	Eliodoro Villazón	PL	Law.	19 March 1902 – 29 April 1902	41	55	2	(Note: First Vice President No. 15, President #27.)		Pando	
48	Government	Justice	José Carrasco Torrico	PL	Law.	29 April 1902 – 27 October 1903	546	55	2	(Note: Second Vice President #19.)		Pando	
49	Government	Development	Luis Ipiña	PL	Law.	27 October 1903 – 14 August 1904	292	56	3			Pando	
–	Government	Development	Aníbal Capriles Cabrera	PL	Law.	14 August 1904 – 30 November 1908	1,569	57	1	Montes			
–	Government	Development	José Carrasco Torrico	PL	Law.	30 November 1908 – 12 August 1909	255	58	2	Montes			
Office vacant 12 August 1909 – 14 August 1909									2	–	–	Villazón	
50	Government	Development	Angel Díez de Medina	PL	Law.	14 August 1909 – 15 October 1910	427	59	1	(Note: Died in office.)		Villazón	
51	Government	Development	Juan Misael Saracho	PL	Law.	15 October 1910 – 22 November 1911	403	59	1	(Note: Second and First Vice President No. 18 (in office).)		Villazón	
–	Government	Development	Aníbal Capriles Cabrera	PL	Law.	22 November 1911 – 21 September 1912	304	60	2			Villazón	
52	Government	Development	Macario Pinilla Vargas	PL	Law.	21 September 1912 – 14 August 1913	327	61	3	(Note: First Vice President No. 17 (in office).)		Villazón	
53	Government	Development	Claudio Pinilla	PL	Law.	14 August 1913 – 7 August 1914	358	62	1	Montes			
54	Government	Development	Juan María Zalles	PL	Law.	7 August 1914 – 3 April 1915	239	63	2	Montes			
55	Government	Development	Arturo Molina Campero	PL	Law.	3 April 1915 – 15 August 1917	865	63	2	Montes			
55	Government	Development	Arturo Molina Campero	PL	Law.	3 April 1915 – 15 August 1917	865	64	3	Montes			
56	Government	Development	Ricardo Mujía	PL	Law.	15 August 1917 – 11 December 1917	118	65	1	Gutiérrez			
57	Government	Development	Julio Zamora	PL	Law.	11 December 1917 – 16 December 1917	5	66	2	Gutiérrez			
58	Government	Development	Julio Anibal Gutiérrez	PL	Law.	16 December 1917 – 30 January 1919	410	66	2	Gutiérrez			
59	Government	Justice	Ismael Vázquez	PL	Law.	30 January 1919 – 3 September 1919	216	67	3	Gutiérrez	(Note: First Vice President No. 20 (in office).)		
60	Government	Justice	Aurelio Gamarra	PL	Law.	3 September 1919 – 4 October 1919	31	67	3	Gutiérrez			
61	Government	Justice	Ernesto Careaga Lanza	PL	Law.	4 October 1919 – 12 July 1920	282	68	4	Gutiérrez			
62	General		Froilán Zambrana	PR	Law.	12 July 1920 – 10 September 1920	60	69	1	Junta			
Office vacant 10 September 1920 – 20 September 1920									10	Junta	70	2	
63	Government		Abel Iturralde	PR	Law.	20 September 1920 – 3 January 1921	105			Junta	70	2	
64	General		Claudio Quintín Barrios	PR	Law.	3 January 1921 – 28 January 1921	25	71	3	Junta			
Office vacant 28 January 1921 – 31 January 1921									3	–	–	Saavedra	
65	Government	Post and Telegraph	José R. Estenssoro	PR	Law.	31 January 1921 – 10 April 1921	69	72	1			Saavedra	
66	Government	Post and Telegraph	Abdón Saavedra	PRS	Law.	10 April 1921 – 27 June 1922	443	73	2	(Note: Vice President No. 24. Brother of Bautisa Saavedra.)		Saavedra	
67	Government	Post and Telegraph	David Alvéstegui Laredo	Ind.	Law.	27 June 1922 – 23 January 1923	210	74	3			Saavedra	
68	Government	Post and Telegraph	Adolfo Flores	PR	Law.	23 January 1923 – 10 March 1923	46	74	3			Saavedra	
69	Government	Justice	Francisco Iraizós	PR	Law.	10 March 1923 – 3 February 1925	696	75	4			Saavedra	
70	Government	Justice	Aniceto Arce	PR	Law.	3 February 1925 – 20 February 1925	17	76	5			Saavedra	
71	Government	Justice	José Paravicini	PR	Law.	20 February 1925 – 3 September 1925	195	76	5			Saavedra	
72	Government	Justice	Manuel Mogro Moreno	PR	Law.	3 September 1925 – 10 January 1926	129	77	1	Guzmán			
73	Government	Justice	Adolfo Mier Revilla	–	Law.	10 January 1926 – 20 July 1926	191	78	1	Siles Reyes			
74	Government	Justice	Enrique Velasco y Galvarro	–	Law.	20 July 1926 – 14 March 1927	237	79	2	Siles Reyes			
75	Government	Justice	Felipe Segundo Guzmán	PRS	Law.	14 March 1927 – 12 November 1927	243	80	3	Siles Reyes	(Note: President #30.)		
75	Government	Justice	J. Minor Gainsborg	–	Law.	12 November 1927 – 2 June 1928	203	81	4	Siles Reyes			
76	Government	Justice	Mariano Zambrana	–	Law.	2 June 1928 – 13 December 1928	194	82	5	Siles Reyes			
–	Government	Justice	Francisco Iraizós	PR	Law.	13 December 1928 – 18 September 1929	279	83	6	Siles Reyes			
77	Government	Justice	Guillermo Viscarra	–	Law.	18 September 1929 – 10 March 1930	173	84	7	Siles Reyes			
78	Government	Justice	Germán Antelo Arauz	–	–	10 March 1930 – 17 June 1930	99	84	7	Siles Reyes			
78	Government	Justice	Germán Antelo Arauz	–	–	10 March 1930 – 17 June 1930	99	85	8	Siles Reyes			
78	Government	Justice	Germán Antelo Arauz	–	–	10 March 1930 – 17 June 1930	99	85	8	C.M.	(Note: Assumes executive power along with the rest of the Council of Ministers upon the resignation of Siles Reyes on 28 May 1930.)		
79	Government	Justice	David Toro	Mil.	Mil.	17 June 1930 – 28 June 1930	11	86	1	C.M.	(Note: President #35.)		
Office vacant 28 June 1930 – 2 July 1930									4	–	–	Blanco Galindo	
80	F.A.	Gov.	Oscar Mariaca Pando	PL	Mil.	2 July 1930 – 5 March 1931	246	87	1			Blanco Galindo	
81	Government	Justice	Luis Calvo	PRG	Law.	5 March 1931 – 9 March 1932	370	88	1	Salamanca			
82	Government	Justice	Enrique Hertzog	PRG	Dr.	9 March 1932 – 25 October 1932	230	89	2	Salamanca	(Note: President #42.)		
83	Government	Justice	Demetrio Canelas	PRG	Law.	25 October 1932 – 11 February 1933	109	90	3	Salamanca			
84	Government	Justice	José G. Almaráz	–	–	11 February 1933 – 30 November 1933	292	90	3	Salamanca			
84	Government	Justice	José G. Almaráz	–	–	11 February 1933 – 30 November 1933	292	91	4	Salamanca			
85	Government	Justice	Rafael de Ugarte	PRG	Law.	30 November 1933 – 9 August 1934	252	92	5	Salamanca	(Note: Vice President-elect (1934). Never took office.)		
86	Government	Justice	Joaquín Espada	PRG	Law.	9 August 1934 – 13 October 1934	65	93	6	Salamanca			
87	Government	Justice	Ovidio Urioste	–	Law.	13 October 1934 – 21 November 1934	39	93	6	Salamanca			
88	Government	Justice	José Antonio Quiroga H.	–	–	21 November 1934 – 29 November 1934	8	93	6	Salamanca			
89	Government	Justice	Tomás Manuel Elío	PL	Law.	29 November 1934 – 12 April 1935	134	94	1	Tejada Sorzano	(Note: Cabinet formed by Vice President José Luis Tejada Sorzano who had been acting president since 28 November. Tejada Sorzano officially assumed office as president on 1 December.)		
90	Government	Justice	José Aguirre Espada	–	–	12 April 1935 – 6 September 1935	147	95	2	Tejada Sorzano			
91	Government	Justice	Alfredo Peñaranda	Mil.	Mil.	6 September 1935 – 1 October 1935	25	96	3	Tejada Sorzano			
–	Government	Justice	José Aguirre Espada	–	–	1 October 1935 – 2 May 1936	214	96	3	Tejada Sorzano			
92	Government	Justice	Gabriel Palenque	–	–	2 May 1936 – 17 May 1936	15	96	3	Tejada Sorzano			
93	Government	Justice	Julio Viera	Mil.	Mil.	17 May 1936 – 13 July 1937	422	97	1	Busch			
93	Government	Justice	Julio Viera	Mil.	Mil.	17 May 1936 – 13 July 1937	422	97	1	Toro			
94	Government	Justice	Félix Tabera	Mil.	Mil.	13 July 1937 – 19 July 1937	6	98	1	Busch			
95	Government	Justice	César B. Menacho	Mil.	Mil.	19 July 1937 – 12 August 1938	389	98	1	Busch			
95	Government	Justice	César B. Menacho	Mil.	Mil.	19 July 1937 – 12 August 1938	389	99	2	Busch			
96	Government	Jus.	Gabriel Gosálvez	PRS	Eco.	12 August 1938 – 18 March 1939	218	100	3	Busch			
97	Government	Jus.	Vicente Leytón	–	Law.	18 March 1939 – 15 April 1940	394	100	3	Busch			
97	Government	Jus.	Vicente Leytón	–	Law.	18 March 1939 – 15 April 1940	394	101	1	Quintanilla			
98	Government	Jus.	Julio de la Vega	Mil.	Mil.	15 April 1940 – 11 November 1940	210	102	1	Peñaranda			
99	Government	Jus.	Demetrio Ramos	Mil.	Mil.	11 November 1940 – 12 June 1941	213	103	2	Peñaranda			
100	Government	Jus.	Zacarías Murillo	Mil.	Mil.	12 June 1941 – 1 October 1941	111	104	3	Peñaranda			
101	Government	Jus.	Adolfo Vilar Mendivil	PL	Law.	1 October 1941 – 20 July 1942	292	105	4	Peñaranda			
102	Government	Jus.	Bernardo Navajas Trigo	PL	Law.	20 July 1942 – 26 November 1942	129	105	4	Peñaranda			
103	Government	Jus.	Pedro Zilveti	PRS	Law.	26 November 1942 – 20 December 1943	389	106	5	Peñaranda			
103	Government	Jus.	Pedro Zilveti	PRS	Law.	26 November 1942 – 20 December 1943	389	107	6	Peñaranda			
104	Government	Jus.	Alberto Taborga	RADEPA	Mil.	20 December 1943 – 11 February 1944	53	108	1	Villarroel			
105	Government	Jus.	Alfredo Pacheco	RADEPA	Mil.	11 February 1944 – 8 August 1944	179	108	1	Villarroel			
105	Government	Jus.	Alfredo Pacheco	RADEPA	Mil.	11 February 1944 – 8 August 1944	179	109	2	Villarroel			
106	Government	Jus.	Alfonso Quinteros	RADEPA	Mil.	8 August 1944 – 31 December 1944	145	110	3	Villarroel			
107	Government	Jus.	Edmundo Nogales Ortiz	RADEPA	Mil.	31 December 1944 – 21 July 1946	567	111	4	Villarroel			
Office vacant 21 July 1946 – 24 July 1946									3	–	–	Guillén	
108	Gov.	P.W.	Cleto Cabrera García	Ind.	Mag.	24 July 1946 – 26 August 1946	33	112	1	(Note: No cabinet was officially formed but the members of the Government Junta exercised the different ministerial portfolios.)		Guillén	
108	Gov.	P.W.	Cleto Cabrera García	Ind.	Mag.	24 July 1946 – 26 August 1946	33	113	1	(Note: No cabinet was officially formed but the members of the Government Junta exercised the different ministerial portfolios.)	Monje		
Office vacant 26 August 1946 – 10 March 1947								113	1	196	Monje		
109	Government	Jus.	Luis Ponce Lozada	PURS	Law.	10 March 1947 – 11 September 1947	185	114	1	Hertzog			
109	Government	Jus.	Luis Ponce Lozada	PURS	Law.	10 March 1947 – 11 September 1947	185	115	2	Hertzog			
110	Government	Jus.	Alfredo Mollinedo	PURS	Dr.	11 September 1947 – 14 April 1950	946	116	3	Hertzog			
110	Government	Jus.	Alfredo Mollinedo	PURS	Dr.	11 September 1947 – 14 April 1950	946	117	4	Hertzog			
110	Government	Jus.	Alfredo Mollinedo	PURS	Dr.	11 September 1947 – 14 April 1950	946	118	5	Hertzog			
110	Government	Jus.	Alfredo Mollinedo	PURS	Dr.	11 September 1947 – 14 April 1950	946	119	6	Hertzog			
110	Government	Jus.	Alfredo Mollinedo	PURS	Dr.	11 September 1947 – 14 April 1950	946	120	7	Hertzog			
110	Government	Jus.	Alfredo Mollinedo	PURS	Dr.	11 September 1947 – 14 April 1950	946	121	1	Hertzog (Urriolagoitía)	(Note: Member of the first cabinet of Mamerto Urriolagoitía formed while he was acting president.)		
110	Government	Jus.	Alfredo Mollinedo	PURS	Dr.	11 September 1947 – 14 April 1950	946	122	2	Hertzog (Urriolagoitía)	(Note: Member of the second cabinet of Mamerto Urriolagoitía as acting president and first cabinet of Urriolagoitía as president.)		
110	Government	Jus.	Alfredo Mollinedo	PURS	Dr.	11 September 1947 – 14 April 1950	946	122	2	Urriolagoitía	(Note: Member of the second cabinet of Mamerto Urriolagoitía as acting president and first cabinet of Urriolagoitía as president.)		
111	Government	Jus.	Jorge Rodríguez	Mil.	Mil.	14 April 1950 – 29 June 1950	76	123	3	Urriolagoitía			
112	Government	Jus.	Ciro Félix Trigo	PURS	Law.	29 June 1950 – 10 August 1950	42	124	4	Urriolagoitía			
–	Government	Jus.	Luis Ponce Lozada	PURS	Law.	10 August 1950 – 15 February 1951	189	124	4	Urriolagoitía			
113	Government	Jus.	José Saavedra Suárez	PURS	–	15 February 1951 – 16 May 1951	90	125	5	Urriolagoitía			
114	Government	Jus.	Antonio Seleme	Mil.	Mil.	16 May 1951 – 11 April 1952	331	126	1	Ballivián			
Office vacant 11 April 1952 – 12 April 1952									1	–	–	Siles Zuazo	
115	Government	Jus.	César Aliaga Carrasco	Mil.	Pol.	12 April 1952 – 22 November 1952	224	127	1			Siles Zuazo	
115	Government	Jus.	César Aliaga Carrasco	Mil.	Pol.	12 April 1952 – 22 November 1952	224	127	1		Paz Estenssoro		
116	Government	Jus.	Federico Fortún Sanjinés	MNR	–	22 November 1952 – 6 August 1956	1,353	128	2		Paz Estenssoro		
116	Government	Jus.	Federico Fortún Sanjinés	MNR	–	22 November 1952 – 6 August 1956	1,353	129	3		Paz Estenssoro		
116	Government	Jus.	Federico Fortún Sanjinés	MNR	–	22 November 1952 – 6 August 1956	1,353	130	4		Paz Estenssoro		
116	Government	Jus.	Federico Fortún Sanjinés	MNR	–	22 November 1952 – 6 August 1956	1,353	131	5		Paz Estenssoro		
117	Government	Jus.	Arturo Fortún Sanjinés	MNR	–	6 August 1956 – 18 January 1957	165	132	1	Siles Zuazo			
118	Government	Jus.	Roberto Méndez Tejada	MNR	–	18 January 1957 – 20 July 1957	183	133	2	Siles Zuazo			
119	Government	Jus.	José Cuadros Quiroga	MNR	Jrnl.	20 July 1957 – 30 May 1958	314	133	2	Siles Zuazo			
120	Government	Jus.	Marcial Tamayo	MNR	Prof.	30 May 1958 – 17 August 1958	79	133	2	Siles Zuazo			
121	Government	Jus.	Wálter Guevara	MNR	Law.	17 August 1958 – 12 November 1959	452	134	3	Siles Zuazo	(Note: President #54.)		
122	Government	Jus.	Carlos Morales Guillén	MNR	Law.	12 November 1959 – 10 June 1960	211	134	3	Siles Zuazo			
123	Government	Jus.	Mario Diez de Medina	MNR	Law.	10 June 1960 – 6 August 1960	57	135	4	Siles Zuazo			
124	Government	Jus.	Eduardo Rivas Ugalde	MNR	Mil.	6 August 1960 – 8 January 1962	520	136	1	Paz Estenssoro			
125	Government	Jus.	José Antonio Arze Murillo	MNR	Law.	8 January 1962 – 3 February 1964	756	137	2	Paz Estenssoro			
125	Government	Jus.	José Antonio Arze Murillo	MNR	Law.	8 January 1962 – 3 February 1964	756	138	3	Paz Estenssoro			
126	Government	Jus.	Rúben Julio Castro	MNR	Law.	3 February 1964 – 31 March 1964	57	139	4	Paz Estenssoro			
127	Government	Jus.	José Fellman	MNR	Law.	31 March 1964 – 6 August 1964	128	139	4	Paz Estenssoro			
128	Government	Jus.	Ciro Humboltd Barrero	MNR	Law.	6 August 1964 – 4 November 1964	90	140	5	Paz Estenssoro			
Office vacant 4 November 1964 – 5 November 1964									1	–	–	Junta	
129	Government	Jus.	Oscar Quiroga Terán	Mil.	Mil.	5 November 1964 – 6 August 1966	639	141	1	Barrientos			
129	Government	Jus.	Oscar Quiroga Terán	Mil.	Mil.	5 November 1964 – 6 August 1966	639	141	1	Co–presidency			
129	Government	Jus.	Oscar Quiroga Terán	Mil.	Mil.	5 November 1964 – 6 August 1966	639	142	1	Ovando Candía			
130	Government	Jus.	Antonio Arguedas Mendieta	–	–	6 August 1966 – 21 July 1968	715	143	1	Barrientos			
130	Government	Jus.	Antonio Arguedas Mendieta	–	–	6 August 1966 – 21 July 1968	715	144	2	Barrientos			
130	Government	Jus.	Antonio Arguedas Mendieta	–	–	6 August 1966 – 21 July 1968	715	145	3	Barrientos			
131	Government	Jus.	David Fernández Viscarra	Mil.	Pol.	21 July 1968 – 27 April 1969	280	146	4	Barrientos			
131	Government	Jus.	David Fernández Viscarra	Mil.	Pol.	21 July 1968 – 27 April 1969	280	147	5	Barrientos			
Office vacant 27 April 1969 – 5 May 1969									8	–	–	Siles Salinas	
132	Government	Jus.	Eufronio Padilla	Mil.	Mil.	5 May 1969 – 26 September 1969	144	148	1			Siles Salinas	
133	Government	Jus.	Juan Ayoroa Ayoroa	Mil.	Mil.	26 September 1969 – 12 May 1970	375	149	1	Ovando Candía			
133	Interior	Migr.	Juan Ayoroa Ayoroa	Mil.	Mil.	12 May 1970 – 6 October 1970	375	150	2	Ovando Candía	(Note: The ministry of Government, Justice, and Immigration is changed. Creation of the Ministry of Interior, Migration, and Justice.)		
Office vacant 6 October 1970 – 9 October 1970									3	–	–	Junta	
Office vacant 6 October 1970 – 9 October 1970									3	–	–	Torres	
134	Interior	Migr.	Jorge Gallardo Lozada	MNRI	Law.	9 October 1970 – 21 August 1971	316	151	1			Torres	
134	Interior	Migr.	Jorge Gallardo Lozada	MNRI	Law.	9 October 1970 – 21 August 1971	316	152	2			Torres	
Office vacant 21 August 1971 – 22 August 1971									1	–	–	Banzer	
135	Interior	Migr.	Andrés Selich Chop	Mil.	Mil.	22 August 1971 – 28 December 1971	128	153	1			Banzer	
136	Interior	Migr.	Mario Adett Zamora	Mil.	Mil.	28 December 1971 – 23 April 1973	482	154	2			Banzer	
137	Interior	Migr.	Alfredo Arce Carpio	MNR	Law.	23 April 1973 – 21 May 1973	28	155	3			Banzer	
138	Interior	Migr.	Walter Castro Avendaño	Mil.	Mil.	21 May 1973 – 14 February 1974	269	155	3			Banzer	
138	Interior	Migr.	Walter Castro Avendaño	Mil.	Mil.	21 May 1973 – 14 February 1974	269	156	4			Banzer	
139	Interior	Migr.	Juan Pereda	Mil.	Mil.	14 February 1974 – 28 November 1977	1,383	157	5	(Note: President #52.)		Banzer	
139	Interior	Migr.	Juan Pereda	Mil.	Mil.	14 February 1974 – 28 November 1977	1,383	158	6			Banzer	
139	Interior	Migr.	Juan Pereda	Mil.	Mil.	14 February 1974 – 28 November 1977	1,383	159	7			Banzer	
140	Interior	Migr.	Guillermo Jiménez Gallo	Mil.	Mil.	28 November 1977 – 21 July 1978	235	159	7			Banzer	
Office vacant 21 July 1978 – 24 July 1978									3	–	–	Junta	
Office vacant 21 July 1978 – 24 July 1978									3	–	–	Pereda	
141	Interior	Migr.	Faustino Rico Toro	Mil.	Mil.	24 July 1978 – 24 November 1978	123	160	1			Pereda	
141	Interior	Migr.	Faustino Rico Toro	Mil.	Mil.	24 July 1978 – 24 November 1978	123	161	2			Pereda	
142	Interior	Migr.	Raúl López Leyton	Mil.	Mil.	24 November 1978 – 8 August 1979	257	162	1	Padilla			
142	Interior	Migr.	Raúl López Leyton	Mil.	Mil.	24 November 1978 – 8 August 1979	257	163	2	Padilla			
142	Interior	Migr.	Raúl López Leyton	Mil.	Mil.	24 November 1978 – 8 August 1979	257	164	3	Padilla			
Office vacant 8 August 1979 – 9 August 1979									1	–	–	Guevara	
143	Interior	Migr.	Jaime Aranibar Guevara	PRA	Eco.	9 August 1979 – 1 November 1979	84	165	1			Guevara	
143	Interior	Migr.	Jaime Aranibar Guevara	PRA	Eco.	9 August 1979 – 1 November 1979	84	166	2	(Note: Following the coup d'état, the Cabinet met in hiding until 15 November 1959.)		Guevara	
144	Interior	Migr.	Carlos Mena Burgos	Mil.	Mil.	1 November 1979 – 16 November 1979	15	167	1	Natusch			
Office vacant 16 November 1979 – 19 November 1979									3	–	–	Gueiler	
145	Interior	Migr.	Jorge Selum Vaca Díez	PCB	Eco.	19 November 1979 – 7 April 1980	140	168	1			Gueiler	
145	Interior	Migr.	Jorge Selum Vaca Díez	PCB	Eco.	19 November 1979 – 7 April 1980	140	169	2			Gueiler	
146	Interior	Migr.	Antonio Arnez Camacho	Mil.	Mil.	7 April 1980 – 17 July 1980	101	170	3			Gueiler	
Office vacant 17 July 1980 – 18 July 1980									1	–	–	García Meza	
147	Interior	Migr.	Luis Arce Gómez	Mil.	Mil.	18 July 1980 – 26 February 1981	223	171	1			García Meza	
148	Interior	Migr.	Celso Torrelio	Mil.	Mil.	26 February 1981 – 30 June 1981	124	172	2	(Note: President #58.)		García Meza	
149	Interior	Migr.	Jorge Salazar Crespo	Mil.	Mil.	30 June 1981 – 4 August 1981	35	172	2			García Meza	
Office vacant 4 August 1981 – 11 August 1981									7	–	–	Junta	
150	Interior	Migr.	Rolando Canido Vericochea	Mil.	Mil.	4 August 1981 – 4 September 1981	24	173	1			Junta	
Office vacant 4 September 1981 – 7 September 1981									3	–	–	Torrelio	
151	Interior	Migr.	Rómulo Mercado Garnica	Mil.	Mil.	7 September 1981 – 21 July 1982	317	174	1			Torrelio	
151	Interior	Migr.	Rómulo Mercado Garnica	Mil.	Mil.	7 September 1981 – 21 July 1982	317	175	2			Torrelio	
151	Interior	Migr.	Rómulo Mercado Garnica	Mil.	Mil.	7 September 1981 – 21 July 1982	317	175	2	Junta			
152	Interior	Migr.	Edgar Rojas Ruiz	Mil.	Mil.	21 July 1982 – 10 October 1982	81	176	1	Vildoso			
153	Interior	Migr.	Mario Roncal Antezana	MNRI	Law.	10 October 1982 – 25 August 1983	319	177	1	Siles Zuazo			
153	Interior	Migr.	Mario Roncal Antezana	MNRI	Law.	10 October 1982 – 25 August 1983	319	178	2	Siles Zuazo			
154	Interior	Migr.	Federico Álvarez Plata	MNRI	Law.	25 August 1983 – 10 May 1985	624	179	3	Siles Zuazo			
154	Interior	Migr.	Federico Álvarez Plata	MNRI	Law.	25 August 1983 – 10 May 1985	624	180	4	Siles Zuazo			
154	Interior	Migr.	Federico Álvarez Plata	MNRI	Law.	25 August 1983 – 10 May 1985	624	181	5	Siles Zuazo			
154	Interior	Migr.	Federico Álvarez Plata	MNRI	Law.	25 August 1983 – 10 May 1985	624	182	6	Siles Zuazo			
154	Interior	Migr.	Federico Álvarez Plata	MNRI	Law.	25 August 1983 – 10 May 1985	624	183	7	Siles Zuazo			
155	Interior	Migr.	Gustavo Sánchez Salazar	Ind.	–	10 May 1985 – 6 August 1985	88	184	8	Siles Zuazo			
156	Interior	Migr.	Federico Kaune Arteaga	MNR	Law.	6 August 1985 – 26 August 1985	20	185	1	Paz Estenssoro			
Office vacant 26 August 1985 – 27 August 1985								185	1	Paz Estenssoro	1		
157	Interior	Migr.	Fernando Barthelemy Martínez	MNR	Eco.	27 August 1985 – 26 February 1987	548	185	1	Paz Estenssoro			
157	Interior	Migr.	Fernando Barthelemy Martínez	MNR	Eco.	27 August 1985 – 26 February 1987	548	186	2	Paz Estenssoro			
158	Int.	Jus.	Juan Carlos Durán	MNR	Law.	26 February 1987 – 3 March 1989	736	187	3	Paz Estenssoro	(Note: Creation of the Office of Social Defense.)		
158	Int.	Jus.	Juan Carlos Durán	MNR	Law.	26 February 1987 – 3 March 1989	736	188	4	Paz Estenssoro			
159	Int.	Jus.	Eduardo Pérez Beltrán	MNR	Law.	3 March 1989 – 6 August 1989	156	189	5	Paz Estenssoro			
160	Int.	Jus.	Guillermo Capobianco Ribera	MIR	Jrnl.	6 August 1989 – 15 March 1991	586	190	1	Paz Zamora			
161	Int.	Jus.	Carlos Saavedra Bruno	MIR	Eco.	15 March 1991 – 6 August 1993	875	190	1	Paz Zamora			
161	Int.	Jus.	Carlos Saavedra Bruno	MIR	Eco.	15 March 1991 – 6 August 1993	875	191	2	Paz Zamora			
161	Int.	Jus.	Carlos Saavedra Bruno	MIR	Eco.	15 March 1991 – 6 August 1993	875	192	3	Paz Zamora			
161	Int.	Jus.	Carlos Saavedra Bruno	MIR	Eco.	15 March 1991 – 6 August 1993	875	193	4	Paz Zamora			
162	Government		Germán Quiroga Gómez	MNR	Eco.	6 August 1993 – 16 December 1994	497	194	1	Sánchez de Lozada	(Note: The Ministry of the Interior becomes the Ministry of Government.)		
162	Government		Germán Quiroga Gómez	MNR	Eco.	6 August 1993 – 16 December 1994	497	195	2	Sánchez de Lozada			
163	Government		Carlos Sánchez Berzain	MNR	Law.	16 December 1994 – 6 January 1995	497	195	2	Sánchez de Lozada	(Note: Minister of the Presidency assumes office as acting Minister of Government on 16 December 1994. Formally takes office on 6 January 1995.)		
163	Government		Carlos Sánchez Berzain	MNR	Law.	6 January 1995 – 1 December 1996	695	196	3	Sánchez de Lozada			
164	Government		Franklin Anaya Vásquez	MNR	Eco.	1 December 1996 – 14 January 1997	44	197	4	Sánchez de Lozada			
–	Government		Carlos Sánchez Berzain	MNR	Law.	14 January 1997 – 3 April 1997	79	197	4	Sánchez de Lozada			
165	Government		Victor Hugo Canelas	MNR	Psy.	3 April 1997 – 6 August 1997	125	197	4	Sánchez de Lozada			
166	Government		Guido Nayar	ADN	Law.	6 August 1997 – 21 June 1999	684	198	1	Banzer			
167	Government		Walter Guiteras Denis	ADN	Den.	21 June 1999 – 25 April 2000	309	199	2	Banzer			
168	Government		Guillermo Fortún Suárez	ADN	Eng.	25 April 2000 – 6 August 2001	468	200	3	Banzer			
168	Government		Guillermo Fortún Suárez	ADN	Eng.	25 April 2000 – 6 August 2001	468	201	4	Banzer			
Office vacant 6 August 2001 – 8 August 2001								201	4	Banzer	2		
Office vacant 6 August 2001 – 8 August 2001									–	–	2		Quiroga
169	Government		Leopoldo Fernández	ADN	–	8 August 2001 – 5 March 2002	209	202	1				Quiroga
170	Government		José Luis Lupo Flores	Ind.	Eco.	5 March 2002 – 6 August 2002	154	203	2	(Note: Described as an independent with close links to the MIR.)			Quiroga
171	Government		Alberto Gasser Vargas	MNR	Law.	6 August 2002 – 19 February 2003	197	204	1	Sánchez de Lozada			
172	Government		Yerko Kukoc del Carpio	MNR	Agr.	19 February 2003 – 17 October 2003	240	205	2	Sánchez de Lozada			
Office vacant 17 October 2003 – 19 October 2003									2	–	–	Mesa	
173	Government		Alfonso Ferrufino	MBL	Soc.	19 October 2003 – 17 August 2004	303	206	1			Mesa	
173	Government		Alfonso Ferrufino	MBL	Soc.	19 October 2003 – 17 August 2004	303	207	2			Mesa	
174	Government		Saúl Lara Torrico	MBL	Law.	17 August 2004 – 9 June 2005	296	207	2			Mesa	
174	Government		Saúl Lara Torrico	MBL	Law.	17 August 2004 – 9 June 2005	296	208	3			Mesa	
Office vacant 9 June 2005 – 14 June 2005									5	–	–	Rodríguez Veltzé	
175	Government		Gustavo Avila Bustamante	–	–	14 June 2005 – 22 January 2006	222	209	1			Rodríguez Veltzé	
Office vacant 22 January 2006 – 23 January 2006									1	–	–	Morales	
176	Government		Alicia Muñoz Alá	MAS	Anth.	23 January 2006 – 23 January 2007	365	210	1	(Note: First female Minister of Government.)		Morales	
177	Government		Alfredo Rada	MAS	Soc.	23 January 2007 – 23 January 2010	1,096	211	2			Morales	
177	Government		Alfredo Rada	MAS	Soc.	23 January 2007 – 23 January 2010	1,096	212	3			Morales	
178	Government		Sacha Llorenti	MAS	Law.	23 January 2010 – 27 September 2011	612	213	4			Morales	
178	Government		Sacha Llorenti	MAS	Law.	23 January 2010 – 27 September 2011	612	214	5			Morales	
179	Government		Wilfredo Chávez	MAS	Law.	27 September 2011 – 23 January 2012	118	214	5			Morales	
180	Government		Carlos Romero	MAS	Law.	23 January 2012 – 15 July 2014	904	215	6			Morales	
180	Government		Carlos Romero	MAS	Law.	23 January 2012 – 15 July 2014	904	216	7			Morales	
181	Government		Jorge Pérez Valenzuela	MAS	Prof.	15 July 2014 – 23 January 2015	192	216	7			Morales	
182	Government		Hugo Moldiz	MAS	Law.	23 January 2015 – 25 May 2015	122	217	8			Morales	
–	Government		Carlos Romero	MAS	Law.	25 May 2015 – 10 November 2019	1,630	217	8			Morales	
–	Government		Carlos Romero	MAS	Law.	25 May 2015 – 10 November 2019	1,630	218	9			Morales	
–	Government		Carlos Romero	MAS	Law.	25 May 2015 – 10 November 2019	1,630	219	10			Morales	
Office vacant 10 November 2019 – 13 November 2019									3	–	–	Áñez	
183	Government		Arturo Murillo	MDS	Bus.	13 November 2019 – 6 November 2020	359	220	1			Áñez	
183	Government		Arturo Murillo	MDS	Bus.	13 November 2019 – 6 November 2020	359	221	2			Áñez	
Office vacant 6 November 2020 – 9 November 2020									3	–	–	Áñez	
Office vacant 6 November 2020 – 9 November 2020									3	–	–	Arce	
184	Government		Eduardo del Castillo	MAS	Law.	9 November 2020–17 May 2025	1650	222	1			Arce	
185	Government		Roberto Ríos	MAS		20 May 2025–incumbent	476	223	2		-	Arce	

== Bibliography ==
- Gisbert, Carlos D. Mesa (2003). Presidentes de Bolivia: entre urnas y fusiles : el poder ejecutivo, los ministros de estado (in Spanish). Editorial Gisbert.
