= Cabinet of Manuel Isidoro Belzu =

Bolivian presidential administration and ministerial cabinet from 1848 to 1855

Cabinet of Manuel Isidoro Belzu Belzu Cabinet
- 17th–22nd Cabinet of the Bolivian Republic
- 1849–1855
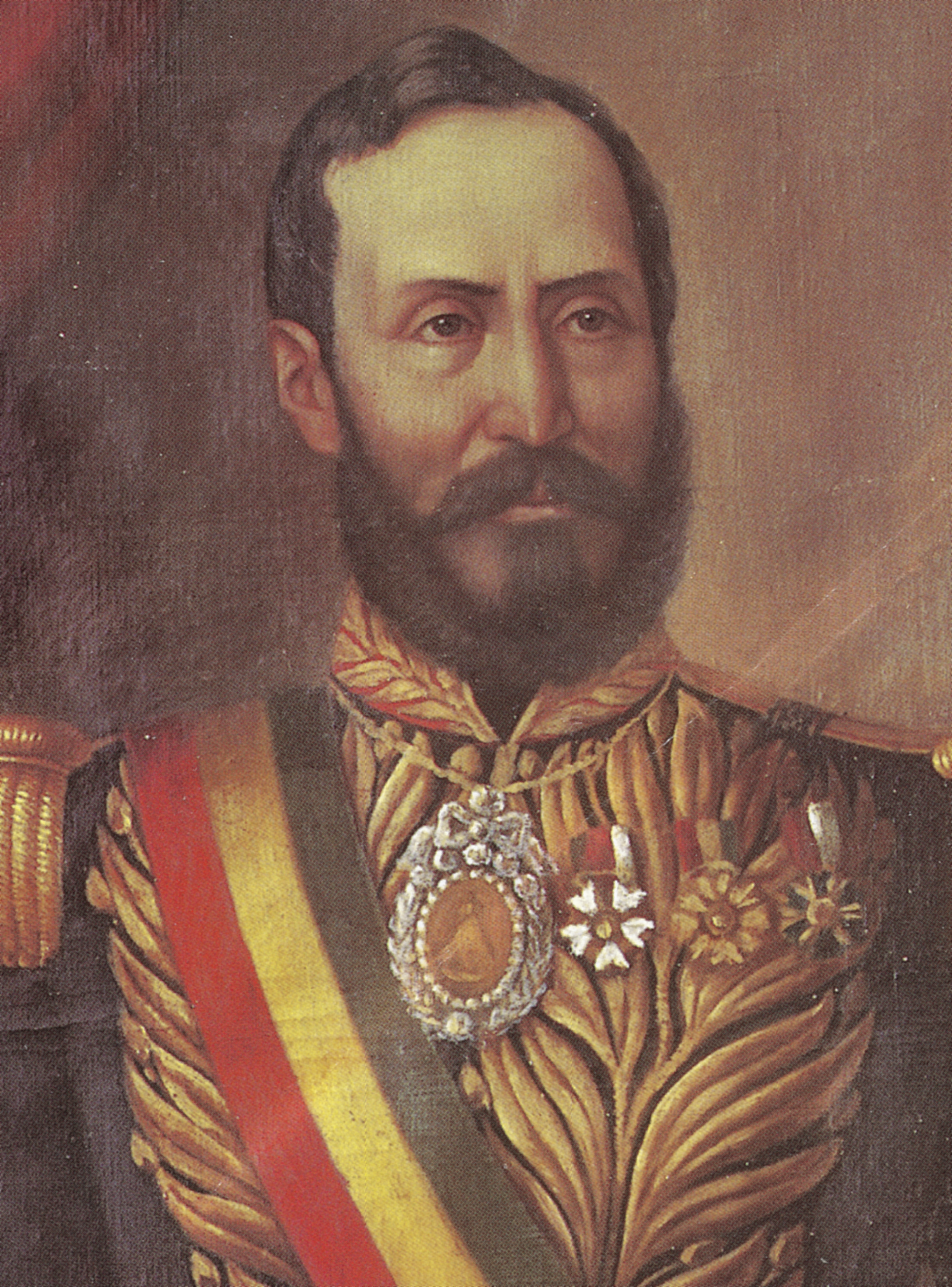
- Date formed: 10 February 1849
- Date dissolved: 15 August 1855 (6 years, 6 months and 5 days)

People and organisations
- President: Manuel Isidoro Belzu
- No. of ministers: 4
- Total no. of members: 15 (incl. former members) (Note: Acting senior officers are not included in this count.)

History
- Election: 1850 general election
- Predecessor: Fourth Cabinet of José Miguel de Velasco
- Successor: Cabinet of Jorge Córdova

The Belzu Cabinet constituted the 17th to 22nd cabinets of the Bolivian Republic. It was formed on 10 February 1849, 66 days after Manuel Isidoro Belzu was installed as the 11th president of Bolivia following a coup d'état, succeeding the Fourth Velasco Cabinet. It was dissolved on 15 August 1855 upon the end of Belzu's term and was succeeded by the Cabinet of Jorge Córdova.

== Composition ==
Portfolio	Minister	Party	Prof.	Took office	Left office	Term	Ref.
President	Manuel Isidoro Belzu	Mil.	Mil.	6 December 1848	15 August 1850	2,443	
President	Manuel Isidoro Belzu	Mil.	Mil.	15 August 1850	15 August 1855	2,443	
Secretary General (Note: Exerts command of all ministerial portfolios while the respective ministries are organized.)	Manuel José de Asín	Ind.	Jur.	13 December 1848	17 January 1849	35	
Secretary General	Lucas Mendoza de la Tapia	Ind.	Mag.	17 January 1849	10 February 1849	24	
Minister of the Interior and Foreign Affairs	Manuel José de Asín	Ind.	Jur.	10 February 1849	18 March 1849	36	
Secretary General	Tomás Baldivieso	Ind.	Mag.	18 March 1849	9 June 1849	921	
Minister of the Interior and Foreign Affairs	Tomás Baldivieso	Ind.	Mag.	9 June 1849	25 September 1851	921	
Minister of the Interior and Foreign Affairs	Juan Crisòstomo Unzueta	Ind.	Mag.	25 September 1851	23 April 1852	293	
Secretary General	Juan Crisòstomo Unzueta	Ind.	Mag.	23 April 1852	11 July 1852	293	
Minister of the Interior	Juan Crisòstomo Unzueta	Ind.	Mag.	11 July 1852	14 July 1852	293	
Minister of the Interior	Rudesindo Carvajal	Ind.	Law.	14 July 1852	6 September 1852	400	
Minister of the Interior	Rudesindo Carvajal	Ind.	Law.	6 September 1852	6 July 1853	400	
Minister of the Interior and Worship	Rudesindo Carvajal	Ind.	Law.	6 July 1853	18 August 1853	400	
Minister of the Interior and Worship	Joaquín de Aguirre	Ind.	Law.	18 August 1853	28 November 1853	530	
Minister of the Interior	Joaquín de Aguirre	Ind.	Law.	28 November 1853	6 December 1853	530	
Secretary General	Joaquín de Aguirre	Ind.	Law.	6 December 1853	31 January 1854	530	
Minister of the Interior and Worship	Joaquín de Aguirre	Ind.	Law.	31 January 1854	28 November 1854	530	
Secretary General	Joaquín de Aguirre	Ind.	Law.	28 November 1854	24 December 1854	530	
Minister of the Interior and Worship	Joaquín de Aguirre	Ind.	Law.	24 December 1854	30 January 1855	530	
Minister of the Interior and Worship	José María Valda (Note: As Senior Officer of the Ministry of the Interior.)	Ind.	Law.	30 January 1855	15 August 1855	197	
Minister of War	José Gabriel Tellez	Mil.	Mil.	10 February 1849	31 January 1853	1,451	
Minister of War	Gonzalo Lanza	Mil.	Mil.	31 January 1853	21 July 1853	171	
Minister of War	Juan Crisóstomo Hermosa (Note: As Senior Officer of the Ministry of War.)	Mil.	Mil.	21 July 1853	24 December 1854	521	
Minister of War	Luciano Alcoreza	Mil.	Mil.	24 December 1854	15 August 1855	234	
Minister of Finance	Lucas Mendoza de la Tapia (Note: As Minister of Public Instruction; acting for Tomás Frías who never took office.)	Ind.	Mag.	10 February 1849	9 June 1849	119	
Minister of Finance	Rafael Bustillo	Ind.	Law.	9 June 1849	9 September 1851	822	
Minister of Finance	Tomás Baldivieso (Note: As Minister of the Interior.)	Ind.	Mag.	9 September 1851	25 September 1851	16	
Minister of Finance	Melchor Urquidi	Ind.	Mag.	25 September 1851	31 January 1853	494	
Minister of Finance	Atanacio Hernández	Ind.	Law.	31 January 1853	18 August 1853	199	
Minister of Finance	Manuel Eusebio Réyes (Note: As Senior Officer of the Ministry of Finance.)	Ind.	Law.	18 August 1853	28 November 1853	102	
Minister of Finance and Foreign Affairs	Rafael Bustillo	Ind.	Law.	28 November 1853	31 January 1854	64	
Minister of Finance	Manuel Eusebio Réyes	Ind.	Law.	31 January 1854	8 November 1854	281	
Minister of Finance	Rafael Bustillo	Ind.	Law.	8 November 1854	30 January 1855	83	
Minister of Finance	Manuel Eusebio Réyes	Ind.	Law.	30 January 1855	15 August 1855	197	
Minister of Public Instruction	Lucas Mendoza de la Tapia	Ind.	Mag.	10 February 1849	29 August 1849	200	
Minister of Public Instruction and Worship	José Manuel Loza	Ind.	Chan.	29 August 1849	3 January 1850	127	
Minister of Public Instruction and Worship	José Agustin de la Tapia	Ind.	Chan.	3 January 1850	25 September 1851	630	
Minister of Public Instruction and Worship	Domingo Delgadillo	Ind.	Chan.	25 September 1851	11 July 1852	290	
Minister of Public Instruction and Foreign Affairs	Rafael Bustillo	Ind.	Law.	11 July 1852	14 July 1852	360	
Minister of Public Instruction, Foreign Affairs, and Worship	Rafael Bustillo	Ind.	Law.	14 July 1852	6 July 1853	360	
Minister of Public Instruction and Foreign Affairs	Joaquín de Aguirre	Ind.	Law.	6 July 1853	18 August 1853	43	
Minister of Public Instruction and Foreign Affairs	Rafael Bustillo	Ind.	Law.	18 August 1853	28 November 1853	102	
Minister of Public Instruction and Worship	José Agustin de la Tapia	Ind.	Law.	28 November 1853	31 January 1854	64	
Minister of Public Instruction and Foreign Affairs	Rafael Bustillo	Ind.	Law.	31 January 1854	8 November 1854	281	
Minister of Public Instruction and Foreign Affairs	Juan de la Cruz Benavente	Ind.	Law.	8 November 1854	9 September 1857	1,036	(Note: Belzu + Córdova.)

== History ==
A few days after his assumption to office, Belzu charged all ministerial portfolios to Manuel José de Asín, as secretary general pending the formation of a proper ministerial cabinet. This charged was transferred to Lucas Mendoza de la Tapia on 17 January 1849. A full council of ministers was appointed on 10 February 1849, almost 2 months since the formation of the General Secretariat.

Due to various circumstances during Belzu's rule, the four ministries were reunited into a single General Secretariat during which time the minister of the interior was charged with executing all ministerial portfolios. This occurred on four occasions in 1849, 1852, from 1853 to 1854, and 1854. The longest of these was the first which lasted for 83 days between 18 March and 9 June 1849 while the shortest was the last at 26 days from 28 November to 24 December 1854.

The most prolific member of this cabinet was Rafael Bustillo who served a total of six different times, switching between the public instruction and finance portfolios. His longest single term was spent as minister of finance, lasting 822 days between 9 June 1849 and 9 September 1851. His shortest, at 64 days, came when he was reappointed to that position from 28 November 1853 to 31 January 1854. Cumulatively, he spent 1712 days (4 years and 8 months) as a government minister.

=== Cabinets ===
N°	Formed	Days	Decree
I	10 February 1849	119	Supreme Decree 10-02-1849
II	9 June 1849	838	Supreme Decree 09-06-1849
III	25 September 1851	290	Supreme Decree 25-09-1851
IV	11 July 1852	403	Supreme Decree 11-07-1852
V	18 August 1853	166	Supreme Decree 18-08-1853
VI	31 January 1854	561	Supreme Decree 31-01-1854

=== Structural changes ===
Portfolio	Part of	Transferred to	Date	Decree
Worship	None	Ministry of Public Instruction	29 August 1849	Supreme Decree 29-08-1849
Worship	Ministry of Public Instruction	None	11 July 1852	Supreme Decree 11-07-1852
Foreign Affairs	Ministry of the Interior	Ministry of Public Instruction	11 July 1852	Supreme Decree 11-07-1852
Worship	None	Ministry of Public Instruction	14 July 1852	Supreme Decree 14-07-1852
Worship	Ministry of Public Instruction	Ministry of the Interior	6 July 1853	Supreme Decree 06-07-1853
Worship	Ministry of the Interior	Ministry of Public Instruction	28 November 1853	Supreme Decree 28-11-1853
Foreign Affairs	Ministry of Public Instruction	Ministry of Finance	28 November 1853	Supreme Decree 28-11-1853
Foreign Affairs	Ministry of Finance	Ministry of Public Instruction	31 January 1854	Supreme Decree 31-01-1854
Worship	Ministry of Public Instruction	Ministry of the Interior	31 January 1854	Supreme Decree 31-01-1854
