= Cabinet of José María de Achá =

Bolivian presidential administration and ministerial cabinet from 1861 to 1864

Cabinet of José María de Achá Achá Cabinet
- 26th–29th Cabinet of the Bolivian Republic
- 1861–1864
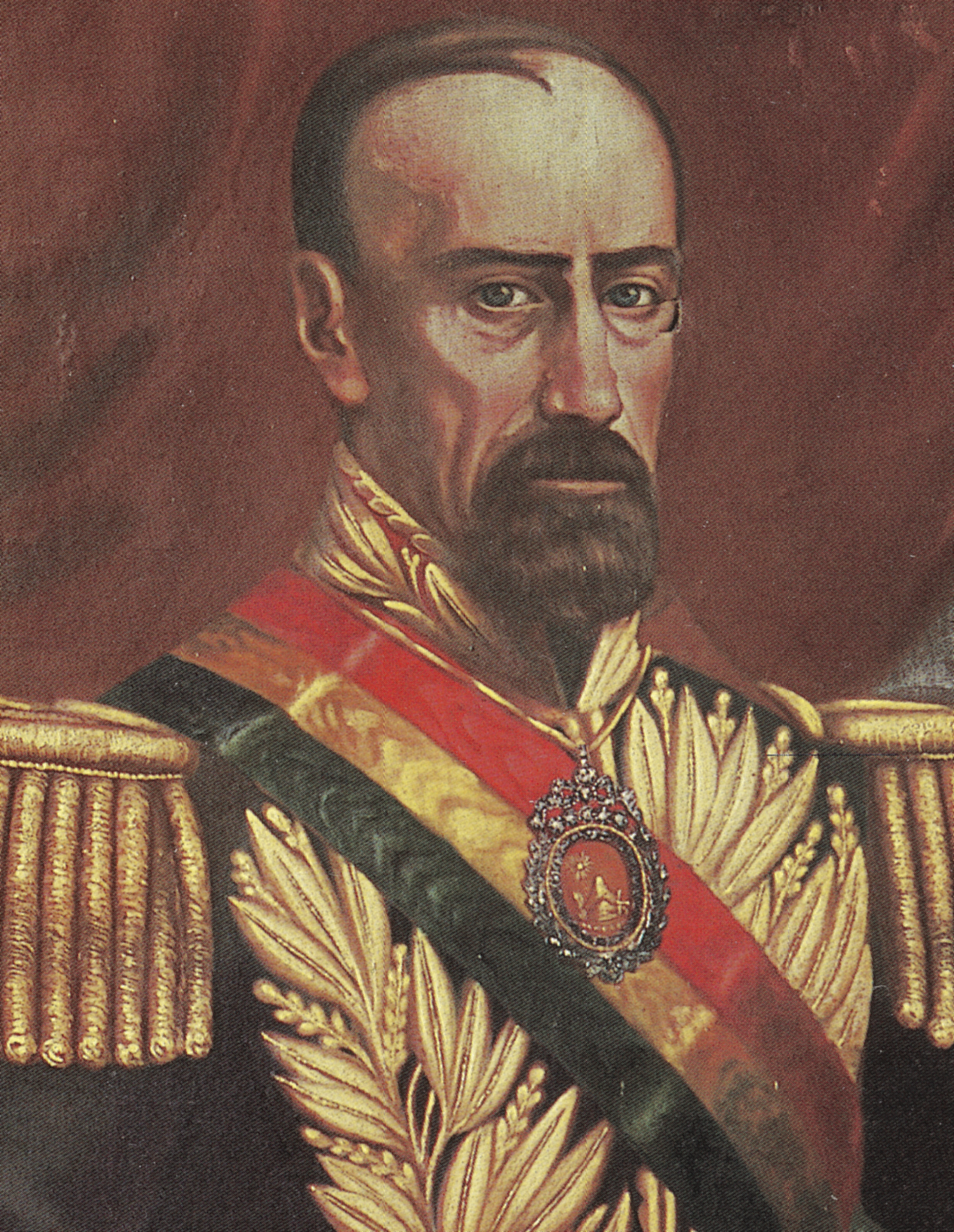
- Date formed: 17 May 1861
- Date dissolved: 28 December 1864 (3 years, 7 months, 1 week and 4 days)

People and organisations
- President: José María de Achá
- No. of ministers: 4
- Total no. of members: 18 (incl. former members)

History
- Election: 1862 general election
- Legislature terms: 1861–1862 Constituent National Assembly; 1862–1864 National Assembly
- Predecessor: Government Junta
- Successor: Cabinet of Mariano Melgarejo

The Achá Cabinet constituted the 26th to 29th cabinets of the Bolivian Republic. It was formed on 17 May 1861, 13 days after José María de Achá was sworn-in as the 14th president of Bolivia following his election by the Constituent National Assembly, succeeding the Government Junta. It was dissolved on 28 December 1864 upon Achá's overthrow in a coup d'état and was succeeded by the Cabinet of Mariano Melgarejo.

== Composition ==
Portfolio	Minister	Party	Prof.	Took office	Left office	Term	Ref.
President	José María de Achá	Mil.	Mil.	4 May 1861	15 August 1862	1,334	
President	José María de Achá	Mil.	Mil.	15 August 1862	28 December 1864	1,334	
Minister of the Interior and Justice	Ruperto Fernández	Ind.	Law.	17 May 1861	29 November 1861	196	(Note: Argentine.)
Minister of the Interior, Justice, and Foreign Affairs	Manuel Macedonio Salinas	Ind.	Law.	29 November 1861	5 December 1861	323	
Secretary General (Note: Exerts command of all ministerial portfolios while the respective ministries are organized.)	Manuel Macedonio Salinas	Ind.	Law.	5 December 1861	23 December 1861	323	
Minister of Government and Foreign Affairs	Manuel Macedonio Salinas	Ind.	Law.	23 December 1861	6 September 1862	323	
Minister of Government, Worship, and Foreign Affairs	Manuel Macedonio Salinas	Ind.	Law.	6 September 1862	18 October 1862	323	
Minister of Government, Worship, and Foreign Affairs	Lucas Mendoza de la Tapia	Ind.	Mag.	18 October 1862	22 December 1862	65	
Minister of Government, Justice, and Foreign Affairs	Juan de la Cruz Benavente	Ind.	Law.	22 December 1862	28 March 1863	96	
Minister of Government, Justice, and Foreign Affairs	Marceliano Cárdenas	Ind.	Law.	28 March 1863	30 March 1863	2	
Minister of Government, Worship, and Foreign Affairs	Rafael Bustillo	Ind.	Law.	30 March 1863	1 November 1864	582	
Minister of Government, Worship, and Foreign Affairs	Serapio Reyes Ortiz	Ind.	Law.	1 November 1864	28 December 1864	57	(Note: Second Vice President N° 09 (Arce).)
Minister of War	Manuel de Sagárnaga	Mil.	Mil.	17 May 1861	20 June 1861	34	
Minister of War	Celedonio Ávila	Mil.	Mil.	20 June 1861	19 September 1862	456	
Minister of War	Sebastián Ágreda	Mil.	Mil.	19 September 1862	22 December 1862	94	(Note: Ex-president N° 07.)
Minister of War	Juan Sánchez	Mil.	Mil.	22 December 1862	11 May 1863	140	
Minister of War	Sebastián Ágreda	Mil.	Mil.	11 May 1863	28 December 1864	597	
Minister of Finance and Foreign Affairs	Rafael Bustillo	Ind.	Law.	17 May 1861	29 November 1861	196	
Minister of Finance	Rudesindo Carvajal	Ind.	Law.	29 November 1861	23 December 1861	323	
Minister of Finance and Worship	Rudesindo Carvajal	Ind.	Law.	23 December 1861	6 September 1862	323	
Minister of Finance	Rudesindo Carvajal	Ind.	Law.	6 September 1862	18 October 1862	323	
Minister of Finance	Aniceto Arce	Ind.	Law.	18 October 1862	22 December 1862	65	(Note: President N° 22; First Vice President N° 04 (Campero).)
Minister of Finance	Melchor Urquidi	Ind.	Mag.	22 December 1862	10 January 1864	384	
Minister of Finance	Miguel María de Aguirre	Ind.	Eco.	10 January 1864	28 December 1864	353	
Minister of Public Instruction and Worship	Manuel Macedonio Salinas	Ind.	Law.	17 May 1861	24 November 1861	196	
Secretary General	Manuel Macedonio Salinas	Ind.	Law.	24 November 1861	29 November 1861	196	
Minister of Public Instruction and Worship	Manuel José Cortés	Ind.	Law.	29 November 1861	23 December 1861	388	
Minister of Public Instruction and Justice	Manuel José Cortés	Ind.	Law.	23 December 1861	22 December 1862	388	
Minister of Public Instruction and Worship	Serapio Reyes Ortiz	Ind.	Law.	22 December 1862	7 January 1863	16	
Minister of Public Instruction and Worship	Rafael Bustillo	Ind.	Law.	7 January 1863	30 March 1863	82	
Minister of Public Instruction and Justice	Juan de la Cruz Rengel	Ind.	Law.	30 March 1863	10 January 1864	286	
Minister of Public Instruction and Justice	Saturnino Sanjinez	Ind.	Mag.	10 January 1864	26 January 1864	16	
Minister of Public Instruction and Justice	Diego Monroy	Ind.	Law.	26 January 1864	28 December 1864	337	

== History ==
One future president and one ex-president, Sebastián Ágreda (1841) and Aniceto Arce (1882–1892) were members of this cabinet.

=== Cabinets ===
N°	Formed	Days	Decree
I	17 May 1861	196	Supreme Decree 17-05-1861
II	29 November 1861	388	Supreme Decree 29-11-1861
III	22 December 1862	98	Supreme Decree 22-12-1862
IV	30 March 1863	639	Supreme Decree 30-03-1863

=== Structural changes ===
Portfolio	Part of	Transferred to	Date	Decree
Interior	Ministry of Government	Ministry of the Interior	4 May 1861	Law 04-05-1861
Foreign Affairs	Ministry of Foreign Affairs	Ministry of Finance	17 May 1861	Supreme Decree 17-05-1861
Foreign Affairs	Ministry of Finance	Ministry of the Interior	29 November 1861	Supreme Decree 29-11-1861
Interior	Ministry of the Interior	Ministry of Government	23 December 1861	Supreme Decree 23-12-1861
Justice	Ministry of the Interior	Ministry of Public Instruction	23 December 1861	Supreme Decree 23-12-1861
Worship	Ministry of Public Instruction	Ministry of Finance	23 December 1861	Supreme Decree 23-12-1861
Worship	Ministry of Finance	Ministry of the Government	6 September 1862	Supreme Decree 06-09-1862
Worship	Ministry of the Government	Ministry of Public Instruction	22 December 1862	Supreme Decree 22-12-1862
Justice	Ministry of Public Instruction	Ministry of the Government	22 December 1862	Supreme Decree 22-12-1862
Justice	Ministry of the Government	Ministry of Public Instruction	30 March 1863	Supreme Decree 30-03-1863
Worship	Ministry of Public Instruction	Ministry of the Government	30 March 1863	Supreme Decree 30-03-1863
