= Cabinet of Narciso Campero =

Bolivian presidential administration and ministerial cabinet from 1880 to 1884

Cabinet of Narciso Campero Campero Cabinet
- 39th–41st Cabinet of the Republic of Bolivia
- 1880–1884
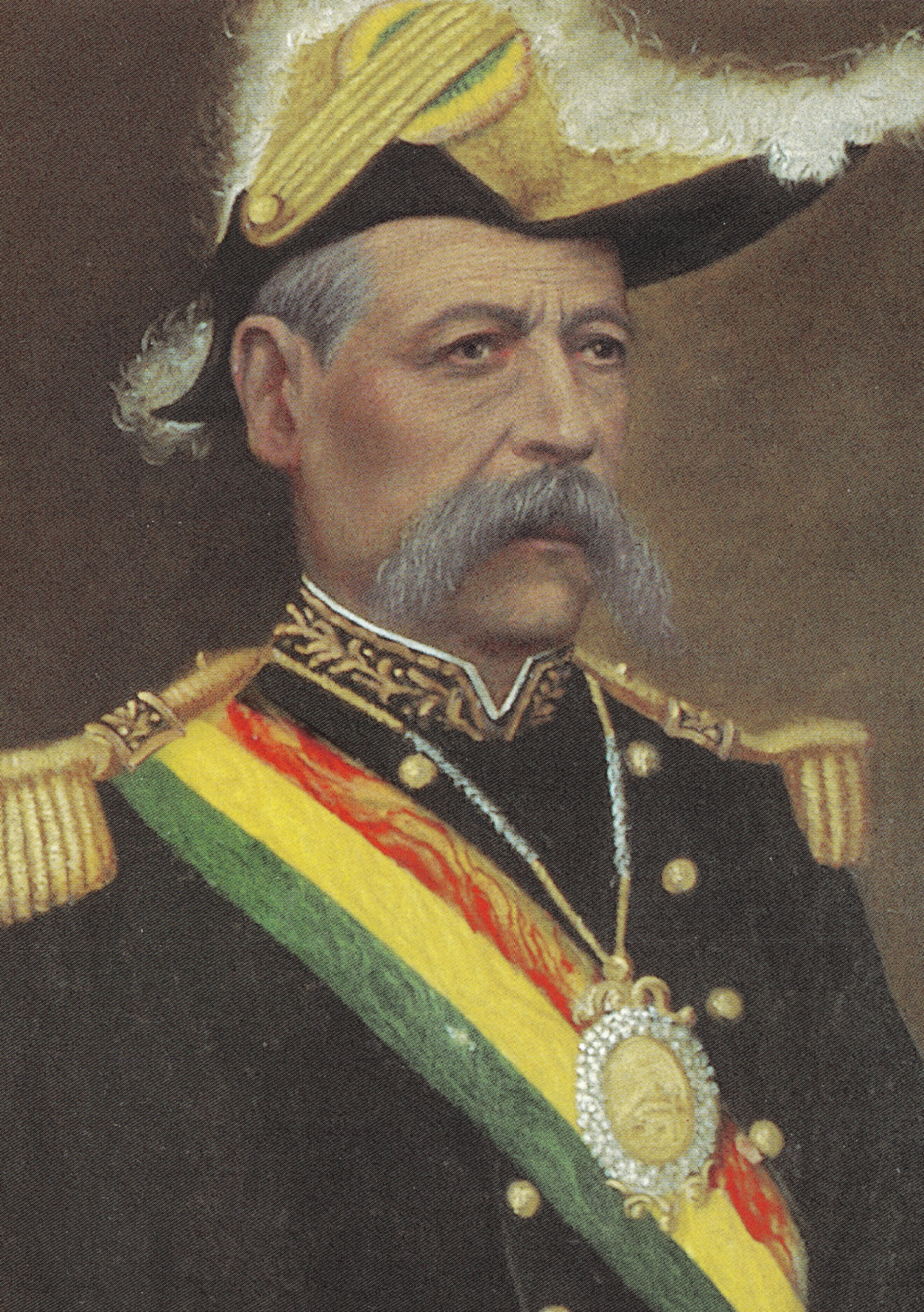
- Date formed: 20 June 1880
- Date dissolved: 4 September 1884 (4 years, 2 months and 15 days)

People and organisations
- President: Narciso Campero
- Vice President: Aniceto Arce (until 11 March 1881); Belisario Salinas
- No. of ministers: 4
- Total no. of members: 16 (incl. former members)
- Member party: Constitutional Party

History
- Predecessor: Cabinet of Hilarión Daza
- Successor: Cabinet of Gregorio Pacheco

The Campero Cabinet constituted the 39th to 41st cabinets of the Republic of Bolivia. It was formed on 20 June 1880, five months after Narciso Campero was installed as the 20th president of Bolivia following the War of the Pacific, succeeding the Daza Cabinet. It was dissolved on 4 September 1884 upon the end of Campero’s term and was succeeded by the Cabinet of Gregorio Pacheco.

== Composition ==
Portfolio	Minister	Party	Prof.	Took office	Left office	Term	Ref.
President	Narciso Campero	Ind.	Mil.	19 January 1880	31 May 1880	1,690	
President	Narciso Campero	Ind.	Mil.	31 May 1880	4 September 1884	1,690	
Vice President	Office vacant 19 January 1880 – 31 May 1880					133	
First Vice President	Aniceto Arce	PC	Law.	31 May 1880	11 March 1881	284	(Note: President N° 22.)
First Vice President	Office vacant 11 March 1881 – 4 September 1884					1,273	
Second Vice President	Belisario Salinas	PC	Law.	31 May 1880	4 September 1884	1,557	
Secretary General (Note: Exerts command of all ministerial portfolios while the respective ministries are organized.)	Ladislao Cabrera	Ind.	Law.	19 January 1880	2 June 1880	135	
Minister of Government and Foreign Affairs	Jenaro Sanjinés (Note: As senior officer of the Ministry of Government and Foreign Affairs.)	PC	Mag.	2 June 1880	20 June 1880	18	(Note: Second Vice President N° 12 (Fernández).)
Minister of Government and Foreign Affairs	Juan Crisóstomo Carrillo	Ind.	Mag.	20 June 1880	18 December 1880	181	
Minister of Government and Foreign Affairs	Belisario Boeto	PC	Mag.	18 December 1880	14 January 1881	27	
Minister of Government and Public Instruction	Daniel Nuñez del Prado	Ind.	Phys.	14 January 1881	31 January 1881	202	
Minister of Government and Foreign Affairs	Daniel Nuñez del Prado	Ind.	Phys.	31 January 1881	4 August 1881	202	
Minister of Government and Foreign Affairs	Pedro José Zilveti	Ind.	Law.	4 August 1881	10 December 1882	493	
Minister of Government and Foreign Affairs	Antonio Quijarro	Ind.	His.	10 December 1882	7 January 1884	393	
Minister of Government and Foreign Affairs	Pedro H. Várgas (Note: As minister of justice, public instruction, and worship.)	Ind.	Law.	7 January 1884	22 February 1884	46	
Minister of Government and Foreign Affairs	Nataniel Aguirre	Ind.	Law.	22 February 1884	4 September 1884	195	
Minister of War	Andrés Soto (Note: As general assistant of the Armed Forces.)	Mil.	Mil.	2 June 1880	20 June 1880	18	
Minister of War	Belisario Salinas	PC	Law.	20 June 1880	18 December 1880	181	(Note: Second Vice President N° 05 (Campero; incumbent).)
Minister of War	Nataniel Aguirre	Ind.	Law.	18 December 1880	4 August 1881	229	
Minister of War	José Manuel Rendon	Mil.	Mil.	4 August 1881	24 November 1883	842	
Minister of War	Jenaro Palazélos	Mil.	Mil.	24 November 1883	4 September 1884	285	
Ministry of Finance and Industry	Eliodoro Villazón (Note: As senior officer of the Ministry of Finance and Industry.)	Ind.	Fin.	2 June 1880	20 June 1880	18	(Note: President N° 27; First Vice President N° 15 (Montes).)
Ministry of Finance and Industry	Antonio Quijarro	Ind.	His.	20 June 1880	18 December 1880	181	
Ministry of Finance and Industry	Eliodoro Villazón	Ind.	Fin.	18 December 1880	4 August 1881	229	
Ministry of Finance and Industry	Antonio Quijarro	Ind.	His.	4 August 1881	10 December 1882	493	
Ministry of Finance and Industry	Fidel Araníbar	Ind.	Law.	10 December 1882	4 September 1884	634	
Minister of Justice, Public; Instruction, and Worship	Nicolás Acosta (Note: As senior officer of the Ministry of Justice, Public Instruction, and Worship.)	Ind.	Law.	2 June 1880	20 June 1880	18	
Minister of Justice, Public; Instruction, and Worship	José María Calvo	Ind.	Jur.	20 June 1880	18 December 1880	181	
Minister of Justice, Public; Instruction, and Worship	Bernardino Sanjinés Uriarte	Ind.	Law.	18 December 1880	14 January 1881	27	
Minister of Foreign Affairs, Justice, and Worship	Daniel Nuñez del Prado (Note: As minister of government and public instruction.)	Ind.	Phys.	14 January 1881	31 January 1881	17	
Minister of Justice, Public; Instruction, and Worship	Federico Jiménez	Ind.	Law.	31 January 1881	4 August 1881	185	
Minister of Justice, Public; Instruction, and Worship	Pedro H. Várgas	Ind.	Law.	4 August 1881	4 September 1884	1,127	

== History ==
N°	Formed	Days	Decree
I	20 June 1880	181	Supreme Decree 20-06-1880
II	18 December 1880	229	Supreme Decree 18-12-1880
III	4 August 1881	52,460	Supreme Decree 04-08-1881
