= Cabinet of Hilarión Daza =

Bolivian presidential administration and ministerial cabinet from 1876 to 1879

Cabinet of Hilarión Daza Daza Cabinet
- 36th–38th Cabinet of the Republic of Bolivia
- 1876–1879
- Date formed: 28 October 1876
- Date dissolved: 28 December 1879 (3 years and 2 months)

People and organisations
- President: Hilarión Daza
- No. of ministers: 4
- Total no. of members: 10 (incl. former members)
- Member party: Constitutional Party

History
- Predecessor: Cabinet of Tomás Frías II
- Successor: Cabinet of Narciso Campero

The Daza cabinet constituted the 36th to 37th cabinets of the Republic of Bolivia. It was formed on 28 October 1876, four months after Hilarión Daza was installed) as the 19th president of Bolivia following a coup d'état, succeeding the Frías cabinet. It was dissolved on 28 December 1879 upon Daza's overthrow in another coup d'état and was succeeded by the Cabinet of Narciso Campero.

== Composition ==
Portfolio	Minister	Party	Prof.	Took office	Left office	Term	Ref.
President	Hilarión Daza	Mil.	Mil.	4 May 1876	28 December 1879	1,333	
President of the Council of Ministers (Note: On 17 April 1879, Daza delegated command to his council of ministers while he took command of the armed forces in the War of the Pacific. Given the absence of Minister of Government Serapio Reyes Ortiz, Pedro José de Guerra, senior minister of the Supreme Court, was entrusted to precide over the council of ministers. On 11 September, de Guerra died and was replaced by Reyes Ortiz.)	Pedro José de Guerra (Note: As President of the Supreme Court of Justice; acting for Serapio Reyes Ortiz. Died in office.)	Ind.	Mag.	17 April 1879	11 September 1879	147	
President of the Council of Ministers	Serapio Reyes Ortiz (Note: As Minister of Government.)	PC	Law.	11 September 1879	28 December 1879	108	(Note: Second Vice President N° 09 (Arce).)
Secretary general (Note: Exerts command of all ministerial portfolios while the respective ministries are organized.)	Jorge Oblitas	PC	Law.	4 May 1876	28 October 1876	470	(Note: Second Vice President N° 07 (Pacheco).)
Minister of Government and Foreign Affairs	Jorge Oblitas	PC	Law.	28 October 1876	17 August 1877	470	
Minister of Government and Foreign Affairs	José Manuel del Carpio	PC	Jur.	17 August 1877	7 May 1878	263	(Note: First Vice President N° 08 (Arce).)
Minister of Government and Foreign Affairs	Luciano Valle (Note: As Senior Officer of the Ministry of Government.)	Ind.	–	7 May 1878	6 June 1878	30	
Minister of Government and Foreign Affairs	Martín Lanza	PC	Jur.	6 June 1878	2 February 1879	241	
Minister of Government and Foreign Affairs	Serapio Reyes Ortiz	PC	Law.	2 February 1879	28 December 1879	329	
Minister of War	Carlos de Villegas	Mil.	Mil.	28 October 1876	7 May 1878	556	
Minister of War	Benjamin Lens (Note: As Senior Officer of the Ministry of War.)	Ind.	–	7 May 1878	6 June 1878	30	
Minister of War	Manuel Othon Jofré	Mil.	Mil.	6 June 1878	28 December 1879	570	
Minister of Finance and Industry	Manuel Ignacio Salvatierra	Ind.	Law.	28 October 1876	7 May 1878	556	
Minister of Finance and Industry	Manuel Peñafiel (Note: As Senior Officer of the Ministry of Finance.)	Ind.	–	7 May 1878	6 June 1878	30	
Minister of Finance and Industry	Eulogio Doria Medina	PC	Eco.	6 June 1878	28 December 1879	570	
Minister of Justice, Public; Instruction, and Worship	José Manuel del Carpio	PC	Jur.	28 October 1876	17 August 1877	293	
Minister of Justice, Public; Instruction, and Worship	Agustín Aspiazu	Ind.	Wri.	17 August 1877	7 May 1878	263	
Minister of Justice, Public; Instruction, and Worship	Ceferino Méndez (Note: As Senior Officer of the Ministry of Justice.)	Ind.	–	7 May 1878	6 June 1878	30	
Minister of Justice, Public; Instruction, and Worship	José Manuel del Carpio	PC	Jur.	6 June 1878	2 February 1879	241	
Minister of Justice, Public; Instruction, and Worship	Julio Méndez	Ind.	Law.	2 February 1879	28 December 1879	329	

== History ==
=== Cabinet ===
N°	Formed	Days	Decree
I	28 October 1876	293	Supreme Decree 01-10-1876
II	17 August 1877	283	Supreme Decree 17-08-1877
III	6 June 1878	570	Supreme Decree 27-05-1878
