= Cabinet of José María Linares =

Bolivian presidential administration and ministerial cabinet from 1857 to 1861

Cabinet of José María Linares Linares Cabinet
- 24th Cabinet of the Bolivian Republic
- 1857–1861
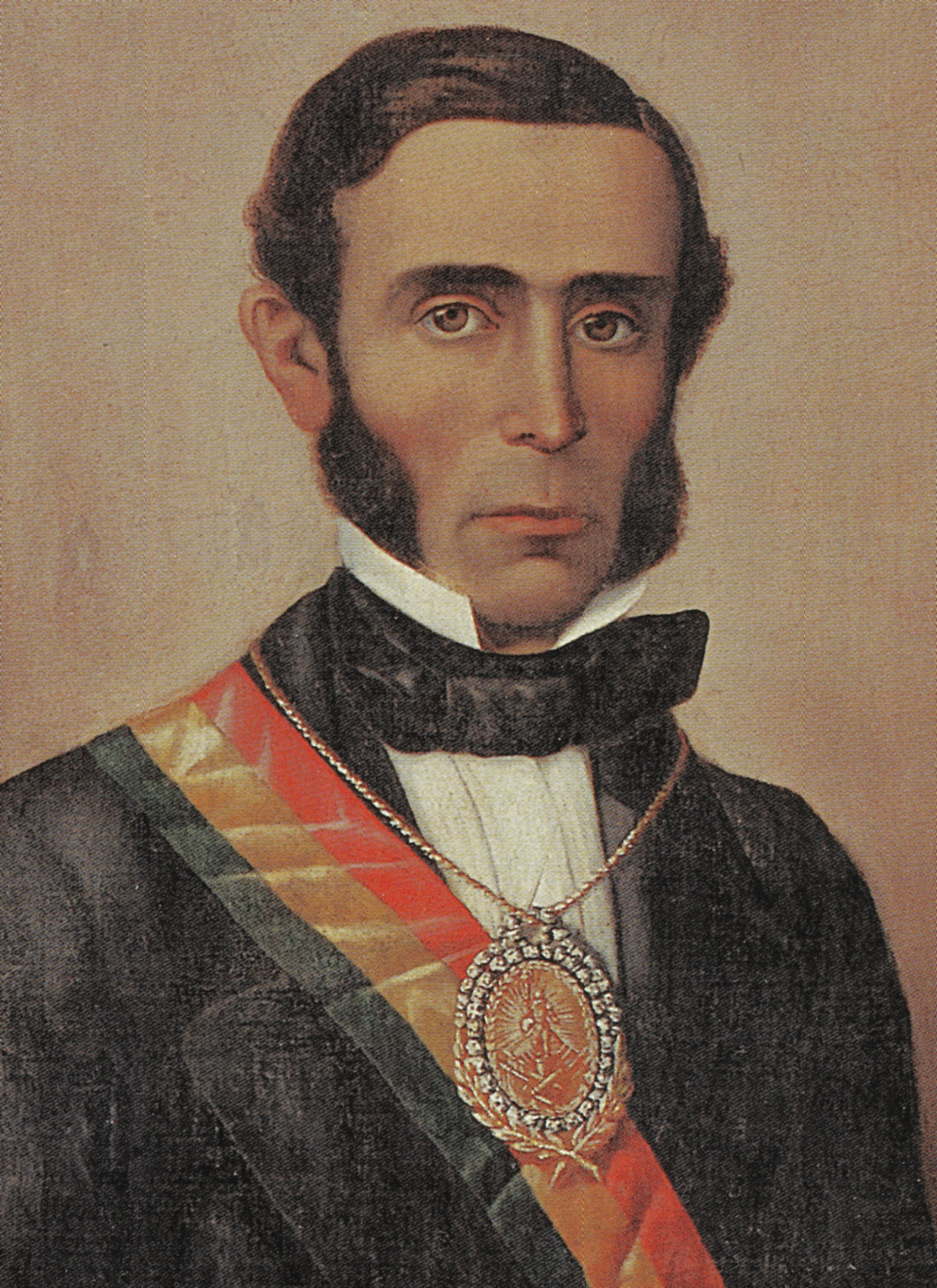
- Date formed: 9 December 1857
- Date dissolved: 14 January 1861 (3 years, 1 month and 5 days)

People and organisations
- President: José María Linares
- No. of ministers: 5
- Total no. of members: 7 (incl. former members)

History
- Predecessor: Cabinet of Jorge Córdova
- Successor: Government Junta

The Linares Cabinet constituted the 24th cabinet of the Bolivian Republic. It was formed on 9 December 1857, 91 days after José María Linares was installed as the 13th president of Bolivia following a coup d'état, succeeding the Córdova Cabinet. It was dissolved on 14 January 1861 upon Linares' overthrow in another coup d'état and was succeeded by a Government Junta.

== Composition ==
Portfolio	Minister	Party	Prof.	Took office	Left office	Term	Ref.
President	José María Linares	Ind.	Law.	9 September 1857	14 January 1861	1,223	
Secretary General (Note: Exerts command of all ministerial portfolios while the respective ministries are organized.)	Ruperto Fernández	Ind.	Law.	9 September 1857	9 December 1857	1,223	(Note: Argentine.)
Minister of Government, Worship, and Justice	Ruperto Fernández	Ind.	Law.	9 December 1857	10 November 1858	1,223	
Minister of Government and Justice	Ruperto Fernández	Ind.	Law.	10 November 1858	14 January 1861	1,223	
Minister of War	Gregorio Pérez	Mil.	Mil.	9 December 1857	5 June 1858	178	
Minister of War	Lorenzo Velasco Flor (Note: As Adjutant General of the Minister of War.)	Mil.	Mil.	5 June 1858	5 October 1858	122	
Minister of War	José María de Achá	Mil.	Mil.	5 October 1858	14 January 1861	832	(Note: President N° 14.)
Minister of Development	Manuel Buitrago	Ind.	Law.	9 December 1857	14 January 1861	1,132	
Minister of Finance	Tomás Frías	Ind.	Law.	9 December 1857	10 November 1858	1,132	(Note: President N° 17 (twice president).)
Minister of Finance and Foreign Affairs	Tomás Frías	Ind.	Law.	10 November 1858	14 January 1861	1,132	
Minister of Public Instruction and Foreign Affairs	Lucas Mendoza de la Tapia	Ind.	Mag.	9 December 1857	10 November 1858	346	
Minister of Public Instruction and Worship	Lucas Mendoza de la Tapia	Ind.	Mag.	10 November 1858	20 November 1858	346	
Minister of Public Instruction and Worship	Evaristo Valle	Ind.	Law.	20 November 1858	14 January 1861	786	

== History ==
Upon his assumption to office, Linares charged all ministerial portfolios to Ruperto Fernández as secretary general pending the formation of a proper ministerial cabinet. A full council of ministers was appointed on 9 December 1857, three months later, composed of four ministers. In this cabinet, a new ministry, the Ministry of Development, was established.

Two future presidents, José María de Achá (1861–1864) and Tomás Frías (1872–1873; 1874–1876) were members of this cabinet.

=== Cabinets ===
N°	Formed	Days	Decree
I	9 December 1857	1,132	Supreme Decree 09-12-1857

=== Structural changes ===
Portfolio	Part of	Transferred to	Date	Decree
Development	None	Ministry of Development	9 December 1857	Supreme Decree 09-12-1857
Justice	None	Ministry of Government	9 December 1857	Supreme Decree 09-12-1857
Worship	Ministry of Government	Ministry of Public Instruction	10 November 1858	Supreme Decree 10-11-1858
Foreign Affairs	Ministry of Public Instruction	Ministry of Finance	10 November 1858	Supreme Decree 10-11-1858
