= First cabinet of Hugo Banzer =

General Hugo Banzer Suárez took the Presidency of Bolivia on 21 August 1971 and formed his cabinet.

Ministry / Date	Foreign and Religious Affaire	Interior	National Defense	Planning and Co-ordination	Finance	Education and Culture
22.08.1971	Mario Gutiérrez Gutiérrez, FSB	Andrés Selich Chop, mil	Jaime Florentino Mendieta Vargas, mil	Edwin Rodríguez Aguirre, MNR	Raúl Lema Peláez, MNR	Augusto Mendizábal Moya, FSB
28.12.1971		Mario Adett Zamora, mil		Julio Prado Salmón, MNR	Edwin Rodríguez Aguirre, MNR	Mario Méndez Elías, FSB
24.08.1972					Luis Bedregal Rodo, MNR	
04.09.1972						
04.09.1972						Jaime Tapia Alipaz, FSB
03.10.1972						
22.11.1972						
23.04.1973		Alfredo Arce Carpio, MNR				
21.05.1973		Walter Castro Avendaño, mil				
04.08.1973						
10.09.1973					Armando Pinell Centellas, MNR	
13.09.1973						
09.10.1973				Fernando Paz Baldivieso, MNR		
26.11.1973	Alberto Guzmán Soriano, mil				Jaime Quiroga Mattos, ind	Mario Serrate Ruíz, FSB
04.12.1973				Sergio Otero Gómez, MNR		
14.02.1974		Juan Pereda Asbún, mil				
23.04.1974						
08.07.1974			René Bernal Escalante, mil		Victor Castillo Suárez, mil	Waldo Bernal Pereira, mil
12.07.1974						
09.11.1974				Juan Lechín Suárez, mil		
12.01.1976					Carlos Calvo Galindo, ind	
19.04.1976	Oscar Adriázola Valda, mil					
28.05.1976						
09.11.1976						Jaime Niño de Guzmán Quiroz, mil
13.10.1977					David Blanco Zabala, ind	
28.11.1977		Guillermo Jiménez Gallo, mil				
23.12.1977			Hugo Bretel Barba, mil			

Ministry / Date	Transport and Communications	Labor and Union Affairs	Industry y Commerce	Mining and Metallurgy	Energy and Hydrocarbons	Agriculture and Peasant Affairs (*)
22.08.1971	Ambrosio García Rivera, FSB	Ciro Humboldt Barrero, MNR	Héctor Ormachea Peñaranda, MNR	Carlos Serrate Reich, MNR	Roberto Capriles Gutiérrez, FSB	José Gil Reyes, mil
28.12.1971				Edmundo Nogales Ortíz, MNR		
24.08.1972				Raúl Lema Patino, MNR		
04.09.1972						
04.09.1972						
03.10.1972						
22.11.1972						
23.04.1973		Guillermo Fortún Suárez, MNR	Juan Pereda Asbún, mil			Alberto Natusch Busch, mil
21.05.1973						
04.08.1973						
10.09.1973		Angel Gemio Ergueta, MNR		Javier Bedregal Gutierrez, MNR		
13.09.1973						
09.10.1973						
26.11.1973		Alfredo Franco Guachalla, MNR		Raúl Lema Patino, MNR		
04.12.1973						
14.02.1974			Miguel Ayoroa Montaño, mil		Guillermo Jiménez Gallo, mil	
23.04.1974						
08.07.1974	Wálter Nuñez Rivero, mil	Mario Vargas Salinas, mil		José Antonio Zelaya Salinas, mil		
12.07.1974						
09.11.1974	Julio Trigo Ramírez, mil		Víctor González Fuentes, mil			
12.01.1976						
19.04.1976						
28.05.1976			Alfonso Villalpando Armaza, mil			
09.11.1976			Carlos Rodrigo Lea Plaza, mil	Alfonso Villalpando Armaza, mil		
13.10.1977	Fadrique Muñoz Reyes, ind				Luis Cordero Montellano, mil	
28.11.1977				Ernesto Camacha Hurtado, mil		
23.12.1977						

(*) 03.10.1972 – 14.02.1974 Agriculture

Ministry / Date	Health and Social Security	Housing and Urbanism	Press and Information	Secretary to the Cabinet	Peasant Affairs	State	Coordination
22.08.1971	Carlos Valverde Barbery, FSB	Sergio Leigue Suárez, FSB	Hugo Gonzáles Rioja, FSB	Alfredo Arce Carpio, MNR	no	no	no
28.12.1971					no	no	no
24.08.1972			Guillermo Fortún Suárez, MNR		no	no	no
04.09.1972					no	Alfredo Arce Carpio, MNR	no
04.09.1972		Arturo Cronembold Parada, FSB		Carlos Iturralde Ballivián, FSB	no		no
03.10.1972					Guido Humerez Cabrera, mil		no
22.11.1972	Luis Leigue Suárez, FSB	Germán Azcárraga Jiménez, FSB					no
23.04.1973			Jaime Caballero Tamayo, MNR	Mario Escobari Guerra, mil	Ramón Azero Sanzetenea, mil		no
21.05.1973							no
04.08.1973						Waldo Cerruto Calderón de la Barca, ind	no
10.09.1973				Guido Valle Antelo, ind			no
13.09.1973			Guillermo Bulacia Salek, MNR				no
09.10.1973							no
26.11.1973							no
04.12.1973							no
14.02.1974				no	no		Roberto Capriles Gutiérrez, FSB
23.04.1974				no	no	Edwin Tapia Frontanilla, FRB	
08.07.1974				no	no		Juan Lechín Suárez, mil
12.07.1974	Jorge Torres Navarro, mil	José Patiño Ayoroa, mil	no	no	no		
09.11.1974		Walter Núñez Rivero, mil	no	no	no	no	no
12.01.1976		Santiago Maesse Roca, mil	no	no	no	no	no
19.04.1976			no	no	no	no	no
28.05.1976			no	no	no	no	no
09.11.1976	Guido Vildoso Calderón, mil		no	no	no	no	no
13.10.1977		Fernando Guillen Monje, mil	no	no	no	no	no
28.11.1977			no	no	no	no	no
23.12.1977			no	no	no	no	no

mil – military

ind – independent

FSB – Bolivian Socialist Falange

MNR – Revolutionary Nationalist Movement

FRB – Barrientista Revolutionary Force
