= Cabinet of Mariano Melgarejo =

Bolivian presidential administration and ministerial cabinet from 1864 to 1871

Cabinet of Mariano Melgarejo Melgarejo Cabinet
- 30th Cabinet of the Republic of Bolivia (Note: 30th cabinet of the Bolivian Republic; 1st cabinet of the Republic of Bolivia.)
- 1867–1871
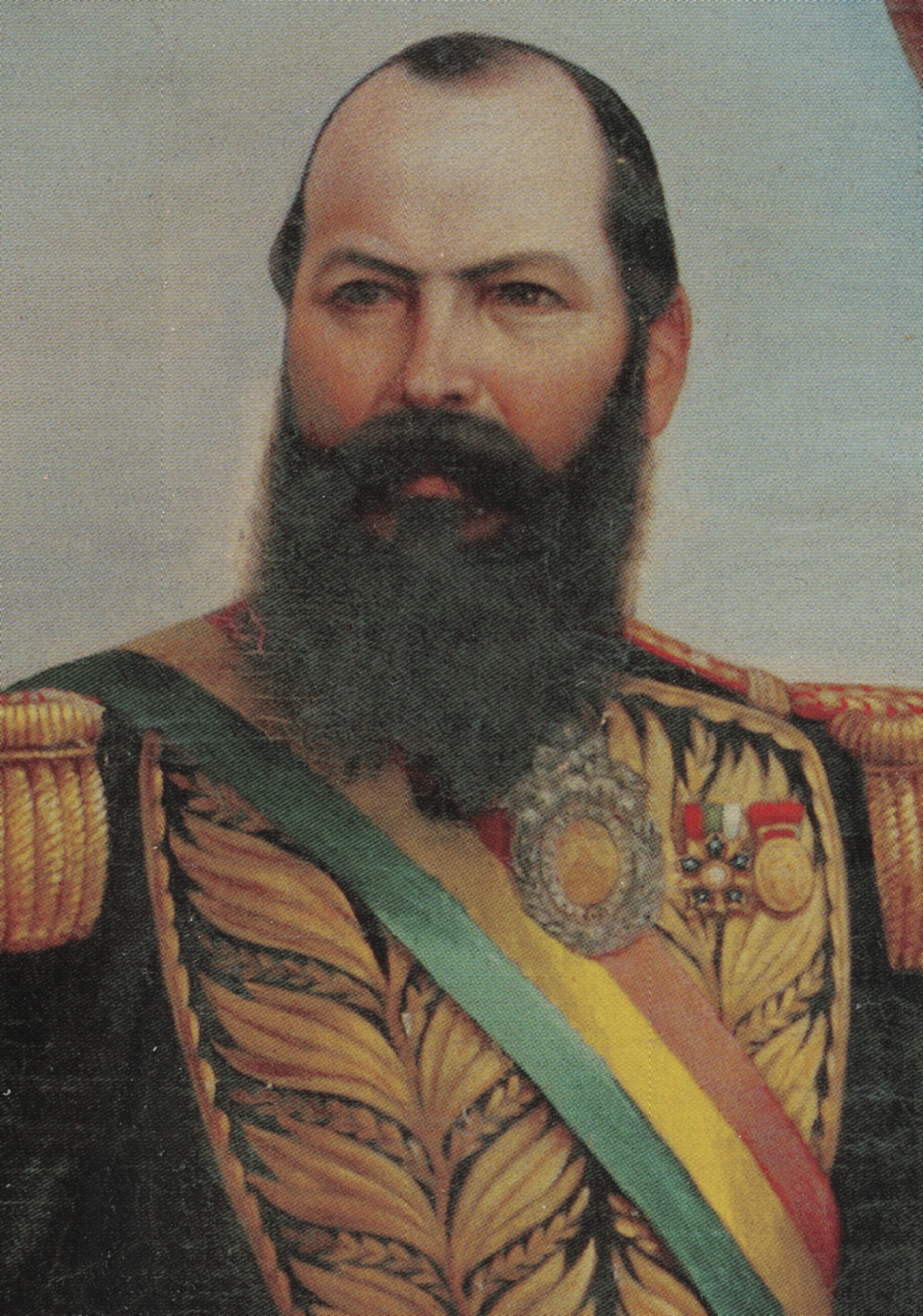
- Date formed: 19 June 1867
- Date dissolved: 15 January 1871 (3 years, 6 months, 3 weeks and 6 days)

People and organisations
- President: Mariano Melgarejo
- Chief of the Cabinet: Mariano Donato Muñoz
- No. of ministers: 5
- Total no. of members: 9 (incl. former members)

History
- Election: 1868 general election
- Predecessor: Cabinet of José María de Achá
- Successor: Cabinet of Agustín Morales

The Melgarejo Cabinet constituted the 30th cabinet of the Republic of Bolivia. (Note: Until 1868, the Bolivian Republic.) It was formed on 19 June 1867 after Mariano Melgarejo was installed as the 15th president of Bolivia following the coup d'état, succeeding the Achá Cabinet. It was dissolved on 15 January 1871 upon Melgarejo's overthrow in another coup d'état and was succeeded by the Cabinet of Agustín Morales.

== Composition ==
Portfolio	Minister	Party	Prof.	Took office	Left office	Term	Ref.
President	Mariano Melgarejo	Mil.	Mil.	28 December 1864	15 August 1870	2,209	
President	Mariano Melgarejo	Mil.	Mil.	15 August 1870	15 January 1871	2,209	
Chief of the Cabinet	Mariano Donato Muñoz	Ind.	Law.	19 June 1867	15 January 1871	1,306	
Secretary General (Note: Exerts command of all ministerial portfolios, except war, while the respective ministries are organized.)	Mariano Donato Muñoz	Ind.	Law.	29 December 1861	19 June 1867	3,304	
Minister of Government, Justice, and Foreign Affairs	Mariano Donato Muñoz	Ind.	Law.	19 June 1867	16 February 1869	3,304	(Note: Also appointed Chief of the Cabinet.)
Minister of Government and Foreign Affairs	Mariano Donato Muñoz	Ind.	Law.	16 February 1869	15 January 1871	3,304	
Minister of War	Juan Sánchez	Mil.	Mil.	29 December 1861	24 April 1865	1,212	(Note: Died in office.)
Minister of War	Pedro Olañeta	Mil.	Mil.	24 April 1865	24 August 1867	852	
Minister of War	Nicolás Rojas	Mil.	Mil.	24 August 1867	22 December 1868	486	(Note: Retains the character and treatment of Minister of State during his absence.)
Minister of War	Gonzalo Lanza	Mil.	Mil.	22 December 1868	11 July 1869	201	
Minister of War	Nicolás Rojas	Mil.	Mil.	11 July 1869	9 October 1869	90	
Minister of War	Gonzalo Lanza	Mil.	Mil.	9 October 1869	15 January 1871	463	
Minister of Finance	Aniceto Vergara	Ind.	Law.	19 June 1867	24 August 1867	66	(Note: Chilean.)
Minister of Finance	Manuel de la Lastra	Ind.	Law.	24 August 1867	15 January 1871	1,240	
Minister of Public Instruction and Worship	Ánjel Remijio Revollo	Ind.	Law.	19 June 1867	25 August 1868	433	
Minister of Public Instruction and Worship	Mariano Donato Muñoz (Note: As Minister of Government.)	Ind.	Law.	25 August 1868	18 September 1868	24	
Minister of Public Instruction and Worship	Manuel José Ribera	Ind.	Law.	18 September 1868	16 February 1869	849	
Minister of Public Instruction and Justice	Manuel José Ribera	Ind.	Law.	16 February 1869	15 January 1871	849	
Minister of Industry and Worship	Mariano Montero	Ind.	–	16 February 1869	15 January 1871	698	

== History ==
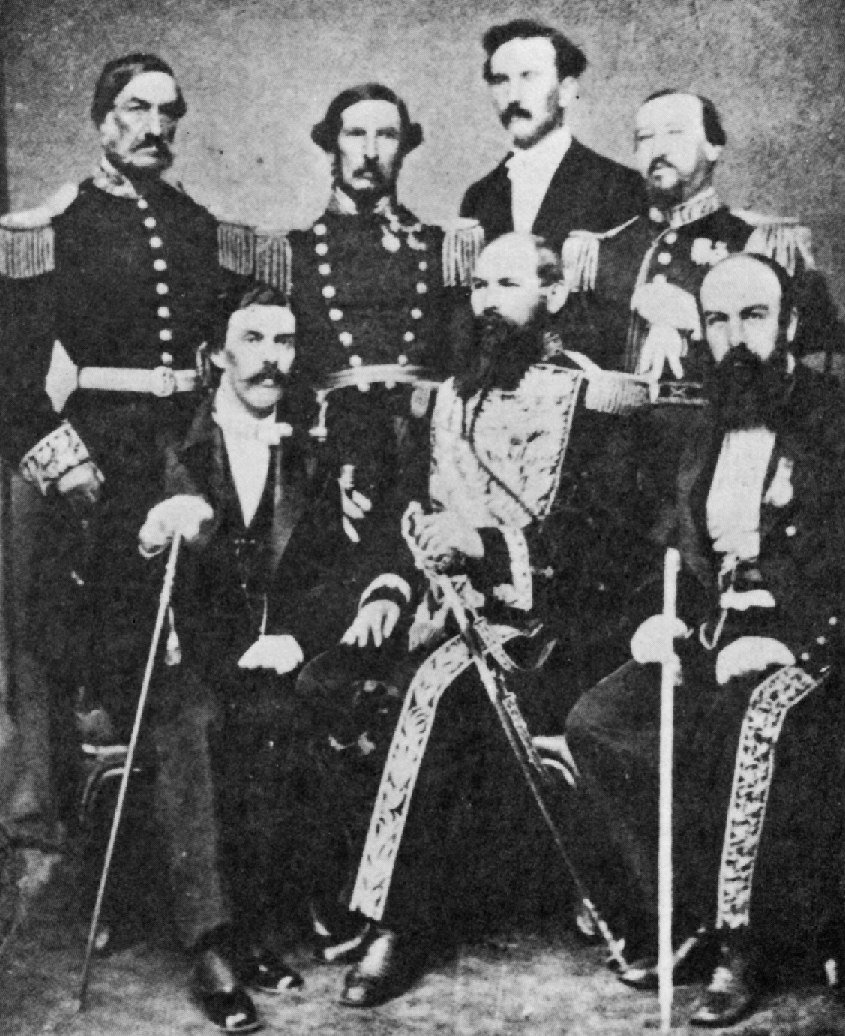
Melgarejo (center) with Prime Minister Muñoz (far-right) and other members of his ministerial cabinet.

Upon his assumption to office, Melgarejo charged all ministerial portfolios to Mariano Donato Muñoz as secretary general pending the formation of a proper ministerial cabinet. A full council of ministers was appointed on 19 June 1867, two and a half years later, composed of four ministers. In addition to the four ministries, Muñoz was appointed to the position of head of the cabinet, a position tantamount to a prime minister, with the power to preside over the cabinet in the event of the absence of the president. On 16 February 1869, a new office, dubbed as the Ministry of Industry and Worship, was established.

=== Cabinets ===
N°	Formed	Days	Decree
I	19 June 1867	1,306	Supreme Decree 19-06-1867

=== Structural changes ===
Portfolio	Part of	Transferred to	Date	Decree
Justice	Ministry of Public Instruction	Ministry of Government	19 June 1867	Supreme Decree 19-06-1867
Worship	Ministry of Government	Ministry of Public Instruction	19 June 1867	Supreme Decree 19-06-1867
Worship	Ministry of Public Instruction	Ministry of Industry	16 February 1869	Supreme Decree 16-02-1869
Industry	None	Ministry of Industry	16 February 1869	Supreme Decree 16-02-1869
Justice	Ministry of Government	Ministry of Public Instruction	16 February 1869	Supreme Decree 16-02-1869
