= Government Junta of Bolivia (1861) =

Military junta ruling Bolivia (1861)

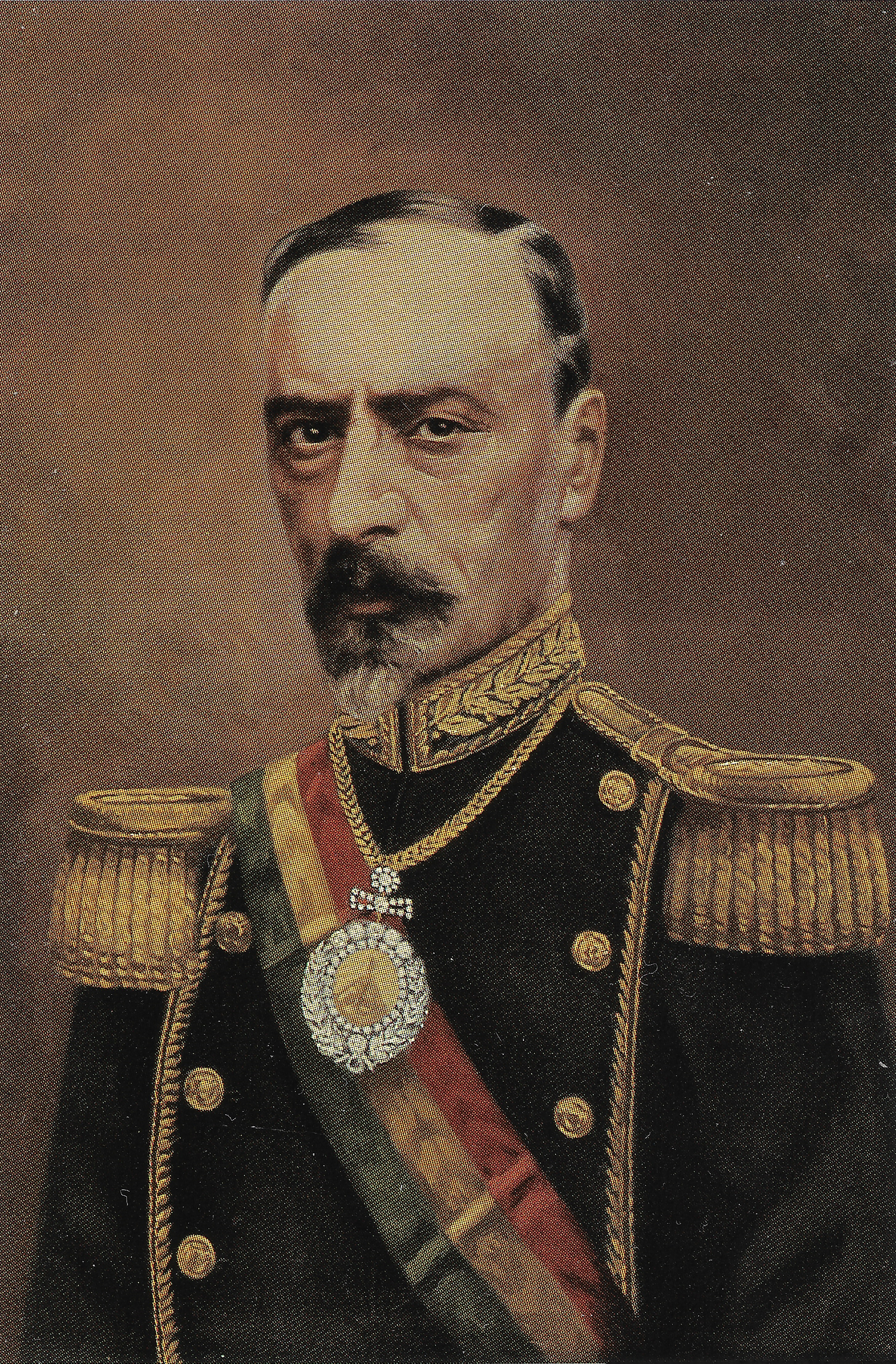
José María de Achá, a member of the junta, was elected president by the National Constituent Assembly

The Government Junta of Bolivia (Spanish: Junta de Gobierno), officially known as the Governmental Junta of the Republic (Spanish: Junta Gubernativa de la República), or also as the Governmental Junta Charged with Supreme Command of the Nation (Spanish: Junta Gubernativa Encargada del Mando Supremo de la Nación), was a civil-military junta which ruled Bolivia from 14 January to 4 May 1861. It was chaired by a triumvirate of three men; two Bolivians and one Argentine: José María de Achá, Manuel Antonio Sánchez, and Ruperto Fernández, all of whom came to power after a coup d'état which ousted the government of José María Linares, the very president they had previously served under. The junta was dissolved on 4 May 1861 when the National Constituent Assembly elected Achá as the provisional president.

== History ==
=== 1861 coup d'état ===
On 14 January 1861, Ruperto Fernández and José María de Achá, ministers of state in the government and war portfolios, joined by Prefect of La Paz Manuel Antonio Sánchez, rebelled against the president they had been serving under, launching a coup d'état which ousted José María Linares. In their manifesto to the nation, the newly formed junta justified its actions as a "regenerative revolution" against the dictatorship President Linares had imposed in 1858.

=== National Constituent Assembly ===
Immediately on 15 January 1861, the junta released the call for the convocation of a constituent assembly. The legislature was tasked with drafting a new constitution, the seventh such charter in Bolivian history, and was to elect a provisional president from among the triumvirs. Legislative elections were carried out in what was considered to be a generally democratic manner, resulting in the establishment of a multi-party assembly with members "from all walks of life". Upon its installation at the Loreto chapel on 1 May, the junta officially ceased its executive functions and transferred them to the assembly, chaired by Adolfo Ballivián. The same day, the assembly redelegated command to the junta until it could finish deliberating on who would lead the provisional government.

Considering that Sánchez had died in April, the assembly was given the choice between Achá and Fernández. The fact that Fernández was of Argentine origin was a factor taken into account and the assembly opted to declare him Bolivian by birth. Nonetheless, on 4 May, the assembly elected Achá provisional president by a vote of 860–16.

== Composition ==
Cabinet of the Governmental Junta Junta-Achá Cabinet
- 25th Cabinet of the Bolivian Republic
- 1861
- Date formed: 21 January 1861
- Date dissolved: 4 May 1861 (3 months, 1 week and 6 days)

People and organisations
- Chairman: José María de Achá; Ruperto Fernández; Manuel Antonio Sánchez (Note: Died in office of natural causes.)
- No. of ministers: 5

History
- Election: 1861 legislative
- Legislature term: 1861–1862 Constituent National Assembly
- Predecessor: Cabinet of José María Linares
- Successor: Cabinet of José María de Achá

Portfolio	Minister	Party	Prof.	Took office	Left office	Term	Ref.
Government Junta of the Republic	José María de Achá	Mil.	Mil.	14 January 1861	4 May 1861	110	
Government Junta of the Republic	Ruperto Fernández	Ind.	Law.	14 January 1861	4 May 1861	110	(Note: Argentine.)
Government Junta of the Republic	Manuel Antonio Sánchez	Mil.	Mil.	14 January 1861	9 April 1861	85	
Minister of Foreign Affairs	Ricardo José Bustamante	Ind.	Wri.	21 January 1861	4 May 1861	103	
Minister of Government and Justice	Manuel Morris	Ind.	Law.	21 January 1861	4 May 1861	103	
Minister of War	Pedro Cueto	Mil.	Mil.	21 January 1861	4 May 1861	103	
Minister of Finance	Juan José Ibargüen	Ind.	–	21 January 1861	4 May 1861	103	
Minister of Public Instruction and Worship	Jacinto Villamil	Ind.	Law.	21 January 1861	4 May 1861	103	

=== Structural changes ===
Portfolio	Part of	Transferred to	Date	Decree
Development	Ministry of Development	None	21 January 1861	Supreme Decree 21-01-1861
Foreign Affairs	Ministry of Finance	Ministry of Foreign Affairs	21 January 1861	Supreme Decree 21-01-1861
