= Alberto Guzmán Soriano =

Bolivian politician (1923–1989)

Alberto Guzmán Soriano (19 February 1923 – 11 November 1989) was foreign minister of Bolivia ("chancellor", or "canceller" in Spanish) from 1973 to 1976 under President Hugo Banzer. He was foreign minister during the negotiations of the Charaña Accords, whose goal was to give Bolivia access to the Pacific Ocean again, and which ultimately failed because of Peru's veto.
