= Guillermo Jiménez Leal =

Guillermo Jiménez Leal (born 18 May 1947 in Libertad, Barinas state, Venezuela) is a Venezuelan singer, musician and poet who is renowned for his distinctive style of Llanos music.

He spent part of his musical career in France, immersing himself in the rich Paris music scene among European and other Latin American musicians. This influenced and forged his style, tempering the usual sharp tone and rapid tempo of Llanos music and leading to him adapting traditional Venezuelan musical elements for a broader world audience.
