= Alfredo Arce Carpio =

Bolivian politician

Minister of the Interior, Migration, and Justice
- In office 23 April 1973 – 21 May 1973
- President: Hugo Banzer
- Preceded by: Mario Adett Zamora
- Succeeded by: Walter Castro Avendaño

Minister of State
- In office 4 September 1972 – 4 August 1973
- President: Hugo Banzer
- Preceded by: José Ortíz Mercado
- Succeeded by: Waldo Cerruto Calderón

Secretary of the Cabinet
- In office 22 August 1971 – 4 September 1972
- President: Hugo Banzer
- Preceded by: Mario Velarde Dorado
- Succeeded by: Carlos Iturralde Ballivián

Personal details
- Born: Alfredo Arce Carpio; 19 March 1941 La Paz, Bolivia
- Died: 9 February 2001 (aged 59) La Paz, Bolivia
- Manner of death: Assassination
- Party: Nationalist Democratic Action (1979–2001); Revolutionary Nationalist Movement (before 1979)
- Education: Higher University of San Andrés

Alfredo Arce Carpio (19 March 1941 – 9 February 2001) was a Bolivian politician, legal figure, and intellectual. He studied law at the Universidad Mayor de San Andrés. Arce Carpio went on to become a judge, later serving as General Counsel of the Presidency and a congressman in Bolivia.

In the field of politics, Arce Carpio held various positions in the first government of Hugo Banzer Suárez, including Minister of Government, Justice, and Immigration, and minister without portfolio. In 1987, he was involved in a drug scandal, which led to his suspension from membership in the Nationalist Democratic Action (ADN).

Political offices
Vacant Title last held by Mario Velarde Dorado	Secretary of the Cabinet; 1971–1972	Succeeded by Carlos Iturralde Ballivián
Vacant Title last held by José Ortíz Mercado	Minister of State; 1972–1973	Succeeded by Waldo Cerruto Calderón
Preceded by Mario Adett Zamora	Minister of the Interior, Migration, and Justice; 1973	Succeeded by Walter Castro Avendaño
