= Juan de la Cruz Benavente =

Bolivian lawyer and politician

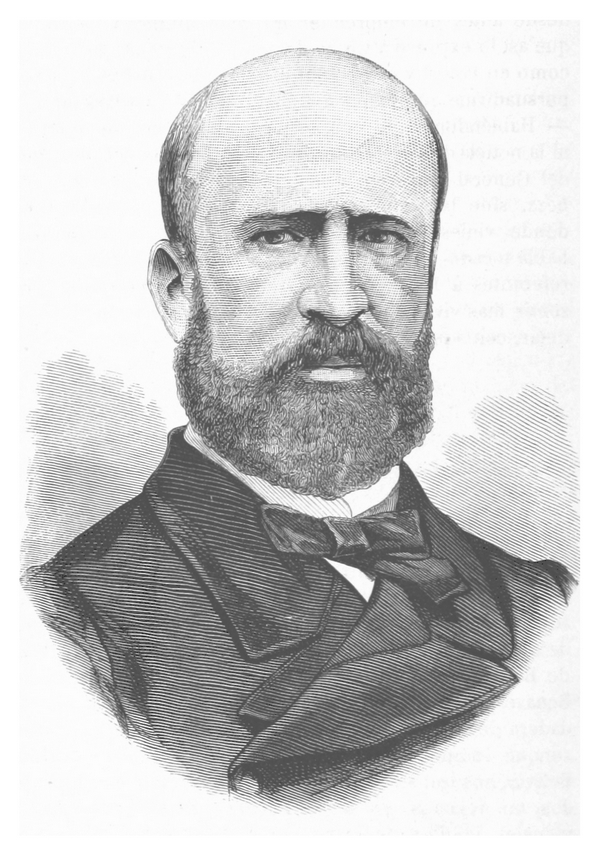

Minister of Government, Justice, and Foreign Affairs
- In office 22 December 1862 – 28 March 1863
- President: José María de Achá
- Preceded by: Lucas Mendoza de la Tapia
- Succeeded by: Marceliano Cárdenas (acting)

Minister General
- In office 15 August 1855 – 17 August 1855
- President: Jorge Córdova
- Preceded by: Office established José María Valda (as acting Minister of the Interior)
- Succeeded by: Office dissolved Basilio Cuéllar (as Minister of the Interior)

Minister of Public Instruction and Foreign Affairs
- In office 8 November 1854 – 9 September 1857
- President: Manuel Isidoro Belzu; Jorge Córdova
- Preceded by: Rafael Bustillo
- Succeeded by: Lucas Mendoza de la Tapia

Personal details
- Born: Juan de la Cruz Benavente c. 1818
- Died: 27 March 1876 (aged 57–58)

Juan de la Cruz Benavente (c. 1818 – 27 March 1876) was a Bolivian lawyer and politician who served as minister of government and foreign affairs from 1862 to 1863. He previously served as minister of public instruction and foreign affairs from 1854 to 1857. In 1863, he was named Bolivia's Minister Plenipotentiary in Peru and was charged with the negotiations that led to the signing of the Treaty of Defensive Alliance with Peru on February 6, 1873.

== Bibliography ==
- Cayo Córdova, Percy: El entorno internacional y la política exterior en el periodo 1870–1876. Tercera parte de Historia Marítima del Perú. La República – 1870 a 1876 (Tomo IX, Volumen 1). Instituto de Estudios Históricos Marítimos del Perú. Lima-Perú, 1993.
- Basadre Grohmann, Jorge: Historia de la República del Perú (1822–1933), 18 tomos. Editada por la Empresa Editora El Comercio S. A. Lima, 2005. ISBN 9972-205-62-2 Edición digital: Perú Quiosco

Political offices
Preceded by Rafael Bustillo	Minister of Public Instruction and Foreign Affairs; 1854–1857	Succeeded by Lucas Mendoza de la Tapia
Preceded by José María Valda as acting Minister of the Interior	Minister General; 1855	Succeeded by Basilio Cuéllar as Minister of the Interior
Preceded by Lucas Mendoza de la Tapia	Minister of Government, Justice, and Foreign Affairs; 1862–1863	Succeeded by Marceliano Cárdenas; Acting
