= Cabinet of Enrique Peñaranda =

Bolivian presidential administration and ministerial cabinet from 1940 to 1943

Peñaranda cabinet
- 102nd–107th Cabinet of the Republic of Bolivia
- 1940–1943
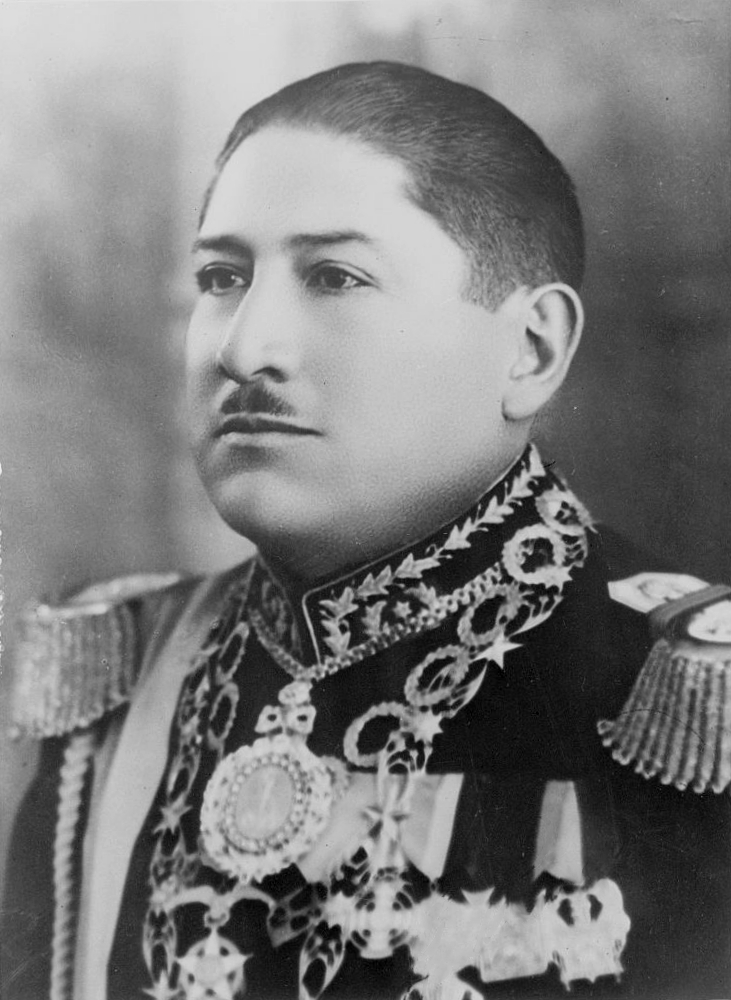
- Date formed: 15 April 1940
- Date dissolved: 20 December 1943

People and organisations
- President: Enrique Peñaranda
- No. of ministers: 9 (on 20 December 1943)
- Total no. of members: 34 (including former members)
- Member parties: Liberal Party (PL); Socialist Republican Party (PRS); Genuine Republican Party (PRG); United Socialist Party (PSU) (from 16 September 1943)
- Status in legislature: Majority government (1940–1943); National unity government (1943)

History
- Election: 1940 general election
- Legislature terms: 1940–1942; 1942–1944
- Predecessor: Cabinet of Carlos Quintanilla (interim)
- Successor: Cabinet of Gualberto Villarroel

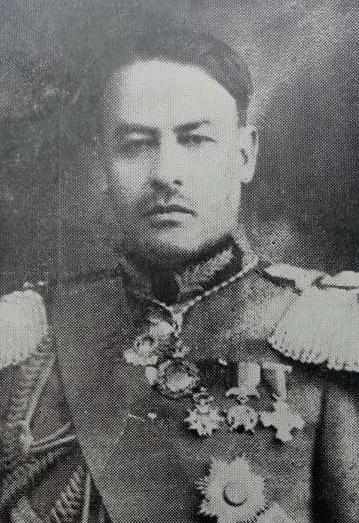
Minister of Defense Carlos Blanco Galindo had been Interim President from 1930 to 1931

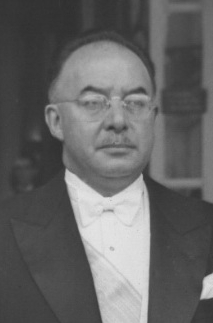
Minister of Work and Health Enrique Hertzog would be elected president in 1947

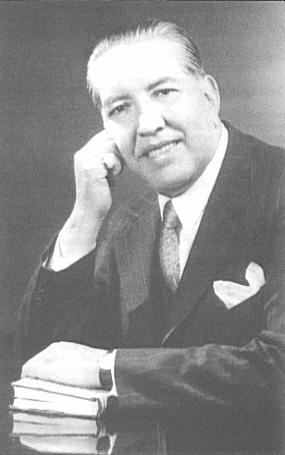
Foreign Minister Tomás Manuel Elío held the office four times prior and negotiated a ceasefire to the Chaco War

Enrique Peñaranda assumed office as the 38th President of Bolivia on 15 April 1940, and his term was terminated by a coup d'état on 20 December 1943. A general in the Chaco War, Peñaranda was brought forth by the traditional conservative political parties, sidelined since the end of the Chaco War, as their candidate in the 1940 general elections.

Peñaranda formed six cabinets during his under 44-month presidency, constituting the 102nd to 107th national cabinets of Bolivia.

== Cabinet ministers ==
Cabinet of Bolivia Presidency of Enrique Peñaranda, 1940–1943
Office		Name	Party	Prof.	Term	Days	N.C (Note: Denoting which national cabinet the minister was originally a part of.)	P.C (Note: Denoting which presidential cabinet the minister was originally a part of.)
President		Enrique Peñaranda	CONC	Mil.	15 April 1940 – 20 December 1943	1344	–	–
Minister of Foreign Affairs and Worship (Chancellor)		Alberto Ostria Gutiérrez	–	Law.	26 August 1939 – 1 October 1941	767	101 (Note: Originally a member of the 101st national cabinet of Bolivia.)	1 (Note: Originally a member of the Quintanilla ministerial cabinet.)
Minister of Foreign Affairs and Worship (Chancellor)		Alberto Ostria Gutiérrez	–	Law.	26 August 1939 – 1 October 1941	767	103	2
Minister of Foreign Affairs and Worship (Chancellor)		Alberto Ostria Gutiérrez	–	Law.	26 August 1939 – 1 October 1941	767	104	3
Minister of Foreign Affairs and Worship (Chancellor)		Eduardo Anze Matienzo	–	Law.	1 October 1941 – 26 November 1942	421	105	4
Minister of Foreign Affairs and Worship (Chancellor)		Tomás Manuel Elío	PL	Law.	26 November 1942 – 16 September 1943	294	106	5
Minister of Foreign Affairs and Worship (Chancellor)		Carlos Salinas Aramayo	PSU	Law.	16 September 1943 – 20 December 1943	95	107	6
Minister of Government and Justice	Minister of Propaganda	Julio de la Vega	Military	Mil.	15 April 1940 – 11 November 1940	210	102	1
Minister of Government and Justice	Minister of Immigration	Demetrio Ramos	Military	Mil.	11 November 1940 – 12 June 1941	213	103	2
Minister of Government and Justice	Minister of Immigration	Zacarías Murillo	Military	Mil.	12 June 1941 – 1 October 1941	111	104	3
Minister of Government and Justice	Minister of Immigration	Adolfo Vilar Mendivil	PL	Law.	1 October 1941 – 20 July 1942	292	105	4
Minister of Government and Justice	Minister of Immigration	Bernardo Navajas Trigo	PL	Law.	20 July 1942 – 26 November 1942	129	105	4
Minister of Government and Justice	Minister of Immigration	Pedro Zilveti (Note: Acting Foreign Minister in the absence of Tomás Manuel Elío from 30 April to 1 July 1943.)	PRS	Law.	26 November 1942 – 20 December 1943	389	106	5
Minister of Government and Justice	Minister of Immigration	Pedro Zilveti	PRS	Law.	26 November 1942 – 20 December 1943	389	107	6
Minister of National Defense	–	Demetrio Ramos	Military	Mil.	15 April 1940 – 11 November 1940	210	102	1
Minister of National Defense	Minister of Colonization	Carlos Blanco Galindo	Military	Mil.	11 November 1940 – 12 June 1941	213	103	2
Minister of National Defense	Minister of Colonization	Jose Miguel Candia	Military	Mil.	12 June 1941 – 20 December 1943	921	104	3
Minister of National Defense	Minister of Colonization	Jose Miguel Candia	Military	Mil.	12 June 1941 – 20 December 1943	921	105	4
Minister of National Defense	Minister of Colonization	Jose Miguel Candia	Military	Mil.	12 June 1941 – 20 December 1943	921	106	5
Minister of National Defense	Minister of Colonization	Jose Miguel Candia	Military	Mil.	12 June 1941 – 20 December 1943	921	107	6
Minister of Finance and Statistics		Edmundo Vásquez	PRS	Law.	15 April 1940 – 11 November 1940	210	102	1
Minister of Finance and Statistics		Joaquín Espada	PRG	Law.	11 November 1940 – 16 September 1943	1039	103	2
Minister of Finance and Statistics		Joaquín Espada	PRG	Law.	11 November 1940 – 16 September 1943	1039	104	3
Minister of Finance and Statistics		Joaquín Espada	PRG	Law.	11 November 1940 – 16 September 1943	1039	105	4
Minister of Finance and Statistics		Joaquín Espada	PRG	Law.	11 November 1940 – 16 September 1943	1039	106	5
Minister of Finance and Statistics		Luis Calvo	PRG	–	16 September 1943 – 20 December 1943	95	107	6
Minister of Economy		Office blank 15 April 1940 – 12 June 1941						
Minister of Economy		Víctor Paz Estenssoro	PSI	Law.	12 June 1941 – 17 June 1941	5	104	3
Minister of Economy		Office vacant 17 June 1941 – 23 July 1941					104	3
Minister of Economy		Alberto Crespo Gutiérrez	–	–	23 July 1941 – 16 September 1943	785	104	3
Minister of Economy		Alberto Crespo Gutiérrez	–	–	23 July 1941 – 16 September 1943	785	105	4
Minister of Economy		Alberto Crespo Gutiérrez	–	–	23 July 1941 – 16 September 1943	785	106	5
Minister of Economy		Germán Chávez	PL	–	16 September 1943 – 20 December 1943	95	107	6
Minister of Industry and Commerce		Hugo Ernst Rivera	PSU	Dip.	15 April 1940 – 11 November 1940	210	102	1
Minister of Industry and Commerce		Office discontinued from 11 November 1940						
Minister of Public Works and Communications		Justo Rodas Eguino	PRS	Law.	15 April 1940 – 11 November 1940	210	102	1
Minister of Public Works and Communications		Oscar Mariaca Pando	PL	Mil.	11 November 1940 – 9 May 1941	179	103	2
Minister of Public Works and Communications		Adolfo Vilar Mendivil	PL	Law.	9 May 1941 – 12 June 1941	34	103	2
Minister of Public Works and Communications		Justo Rodas Eguino (Note: Acting Foreign Minister in the absence of Eduardo Anze Matienzo from 4 January to 5 February 1942.)	PRS	Law.	12 June 1941 – 26 November 1942	532	104	3
Minister of Public Works and Communications		Justo Rodas Eguino	PRS	Law.	12 June 1941 – 26 November 1942	532	105	4
Minister of Public Works and Communications		Julio Sanjinés	Military	Mil.	26 November 1942 – 16 September 1943	294	106	5
Minister of Public Works and Communications		José Salmón Ballivián	–	–	16 September 1943 – 20 December 1943	95	107	6
Minister of Mining and Petrol		Alfredo Jordán	PL	Law.	15 April 1940 – 11 November 1940	210	102	1
Minister of Mining and Petrol		Edmundo Vásquez	PRS	Law.	11 November 1940 – 12 June 1941	213	103	2
Minister of Mining and Petrol		Office discontinued from 12 June 1941						
Minister of Work and Social Security	–	Bernardo Navajas Trigo	PL	Law.	15 April 1940 – 11 November 1940	210	102	1
Minister of Work and Social Security	Minister of Health	Abelardo Ibáñez Benavente	–	Dr.	11 November 1940 – 26 November 1942	745	103	2
Minister of Work and Social Security	Minister of Health	Abelardo Ibáñez Benavente	–	Dr.	11 November 1940 – 26 November 1942	745	104	3
Minister of Work and Social Security	Minister of Health	Abelardo Ibáñez Benavente	–	Dr.	11 November 1940 – 26 November 1942	745	105	4
Minister of Work and Social Security	Minister of Health	Juan Manuel Balcázar	PRS	Dr.	26 November 1942 – 16 September 1943	294	106	5
Minister of Work and Social Security	Minister of Health	Enrique Hertzog	PRG	Dr.	16 September 1943 – 20 December 1943	95	107	6
Minister of Health and Hygiene		Abelardo Ibáñez Benavente	–	Dr.	15 April 1940 – 11 November 1940	210	102	1
Minister of Health and Hygiene		Office under the Ministry of Work and Social Security from 11 November 1942						
Minister of Education, Fine Arts, and Indigenous Affairs		Gustavo Adolfo Otero (Note: Acting Foreign Minister in the absence of Alberto Ostria Gutiérrez from 20 January to 3 February 1941.)	–	Wri.	15 April 1940 – 12 June 1941	423	102	1
Minister of Education, Fine Arts, and Indigenous Affairs		Gustavo Adolfo Otero	–	Wri.	15 April 1940 – 12 June 1941	423	103	2
Minister of Education, Fine Arts, and Indigenous Affairs		Adolfo Vilar Mendivil	PL	Law.	12 June 1941 – 1 October 1941	111	104	3
Minister of Education, Fine Arts, and Indigenous Affairs		Arturo Pinto Escalier (Note: Acting Foreign Minister in the absence of Eduardo Anze Matienzo from 5 to 11 February 1942.)	PRG	Dr.	1 October 1941 – 26 November 1942	292	105	4
Minister of Education, Fine Arts, and Indigenous Affairs		Rubén Terrazas	PRG	Law.	26 November 1942 – 16 September 1943	294	106	5
Minister of Education, Fine Arts, and Indigenous Affairs		Francisco Lazcano Soruco	PSU	–	16 September 1943 – 20 December 1943	95	107	6
Minister of Agriculture	Minister of Irrigation, Immigration, and Colonization	Alcides Arguedas	PL	Wri.	15 April 1940 – 11 November 1940	210	102	1
Minister of Agriculture	Minister of Irrigation, Mining, and Petrol	Edmundo Vásquez	PRS	Law.	11 November 1940 – 12 June 1941	213	103	2
Minister of Agriculture	–	Office vacant 12 June 1941 – 26 November 1942					104	3
Minister of Agriculture	–	Office vacant 12 June 1941 – 26 November 1942					105	4
Minister of Agriculture	Minister of Livestock	Arturo Galindo	PL	Law.	26 November 1942 – 16 September 1943	294	106	5
Minister of Agriculture	Minister of Livestock and Colonization (Note: Acting/Interim?)	Julio Céspedes Añez	PRS	–	16 September 1943 – 20 December 1943	95	107	6

== Composition ==
=== First cabinet ===
Peñaranda's first cabinet was formed upon taking office on 15 April 1940 and was the 102nd national cabinet of Bolivia. Foreign Minister Alberto Ostria Gutiérrez was the only holdover from the interim Carlos Quintanilla government. Military figures Julio de la Vega and Demetrio Ramos were made Minister of Government, Justice, and Propaganda and Minister of National Defense respectively. Alcides Arguedas, a Liberal Party writer, journalist, and critic of the previous leftist governments, was made Minister of Agriculture, Irrigation, Colonization, and Immigration. Another noted writer, Gustavo Adolfo Otero was made Minister of Education, Fine Arts, and Indigenous Affairs. The Office of Fine Arts under the Ministry of Education and the Office of Irrigation under the Ministry of Agriculture were both newly established as part of this cabinet.

=== Second cabinet ===
Peñaranda's second cabinet was formed on 11 November 1940 and was the 103rd national cabinet of Bolivia. With the resignation of Arguedas, the offices he held were redistributed to different ministers. In this and future cabinets, the Office of Immigration would be held by the Ministry of Government and the Office of Colonization by the Ministry of Defense. The Ministry of Mining and Petrol was assigned to the new Minister of Agriculture and Irrigation, Edmundo Vásquez. The Ministries of Propaganda and Industry and Commerce were discontinued. As was the Ministry of Hygiene, with the Ministry of Health falling under the purview of the Ministry of Work and Social Security. Health Minister Abelardo Ibáñez Benavente also became Minister of Work.

=== Third and fourth cabinets ===
Peñaranda's third cabinet was formed on 12 June 1941 and was the 104th national cabinet of Bolivia. This cabinet saw the establishment of the Ministry of Economy separate from the Ministry of Finance and Statistics. Future President Víctor Paz Estenssoro was its first minister, though he only held the office for five days.

Peñaranda's third cabinet was formed on 1 October 1941 and was the 105th national cabinet of Bolivia. The Ministry of Agriculture remained vacant in both the third and fourth cabinets.

=== Fifth and sixth cabinets ===
Peñaranda's fifth cabinet was formed on 26 November 1942 and was the 106th national cabinet of Bolivia. The Ministry of Agriculture was filled once again with the addition of the new Ministry of Livestock, though with the Ministry of Mining and Petrol being discontinued.

Peñaranda's sixth and final cabinet was formed on 16 September 1943 and was the 107th national cabinet of Bolivia. Faced with opposition from the left-wing in Congress, Peñaranda attempted to form a national unity government for his seventh cabinet. Representatives from the United Socialist Party (PSU) were invited to join the administration. These were Carlos Salinas Aramayo (Foreign Minister), the then-leader of the PSU, and Francisco Lazcano Soruco (Education).

In December of the same year, Enrique Peñaranda would be deposed by liberal forces of the Revolutionary Nationalist Movement (MNR) and left-wing young officers led by Gualberto Villarroel.

=== Established Ministries ===
- Office of Fine Arts (under Education): Gustavo Adolfo Otero, first holder from 15 April 1940
- Office of Irrigation (under Agriculture): Alcides Arguedas (PL), first holder from 15 April 1940
- Ministry of Economy: Víctor Paz Estenssoro (PSI), first holder from 12 June 1941
- Office of Livestock (under Agriculture): Arturo Galindo (PL), first holder from 26 November 1942

== Analysis ==
The six cabinets of Enrique Peñaranda reflected a brief return to the traditional political order Bolivia had seen prior to the Chaco War. The majority of ministerial positions were filled by members of the Genuine Republican (PRG), Socialist Republican (PRS), and Liberal (LP), parties which had been sidelined by the Military Socialist administrations of David Toro and Germán Busch. Three Bolivian presidents served in the Peñaranda administration. Minister of Defense Carlos Blanco Galindo had served as Interim President from 1930 to 1931. Finance Minister Víctor Paz Estenssoro and Health and Labor Minister Enrique Hertzog would both be elected president in the late 1940s and early 1950s.

== Gallery ==
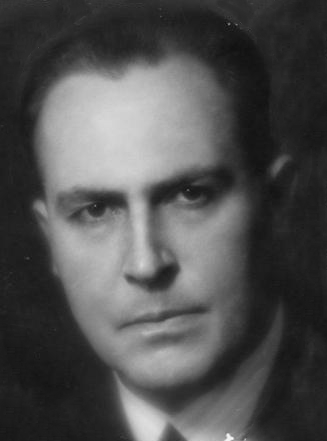
Alberto Ostria Gutiérrez –
Minister of Foreign Affairs

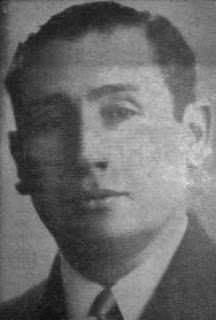
Eduardo Anze Matienzo –
Minister of Foreign Affairs

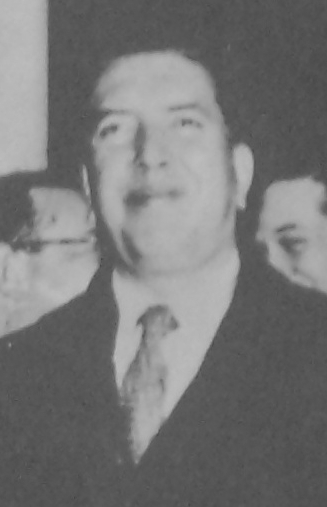
Tomás Manuel Elío –
Minister of Foreign Affairs (PL)

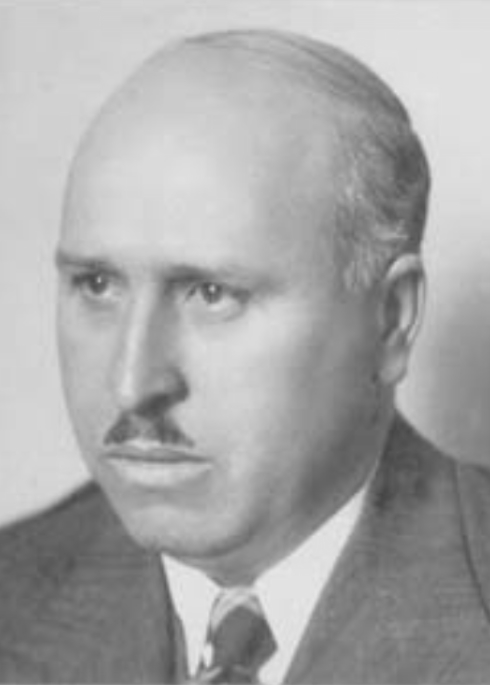
Carlos Salinas Aramayo –
Minister of Foreign Affairs (PSU)

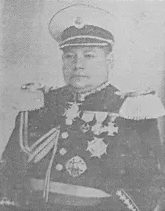
Demetrio Ramos –
Minister of Government and Minister of National Defense

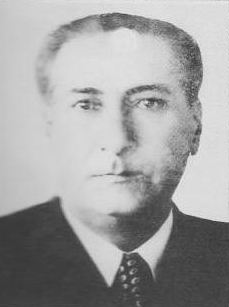
Adolfo Vilar Mendivil –
Minister of Government, Minister of Public Works, and Minister of Education (PL)

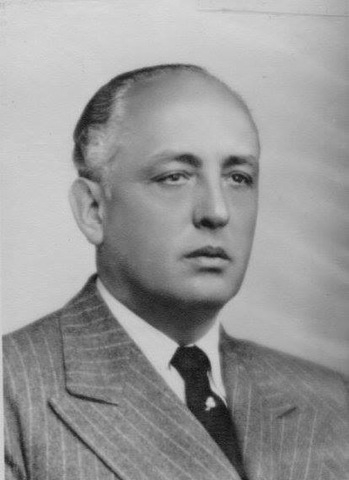
Pedro Zilveti –
Minister of Government (PRS)

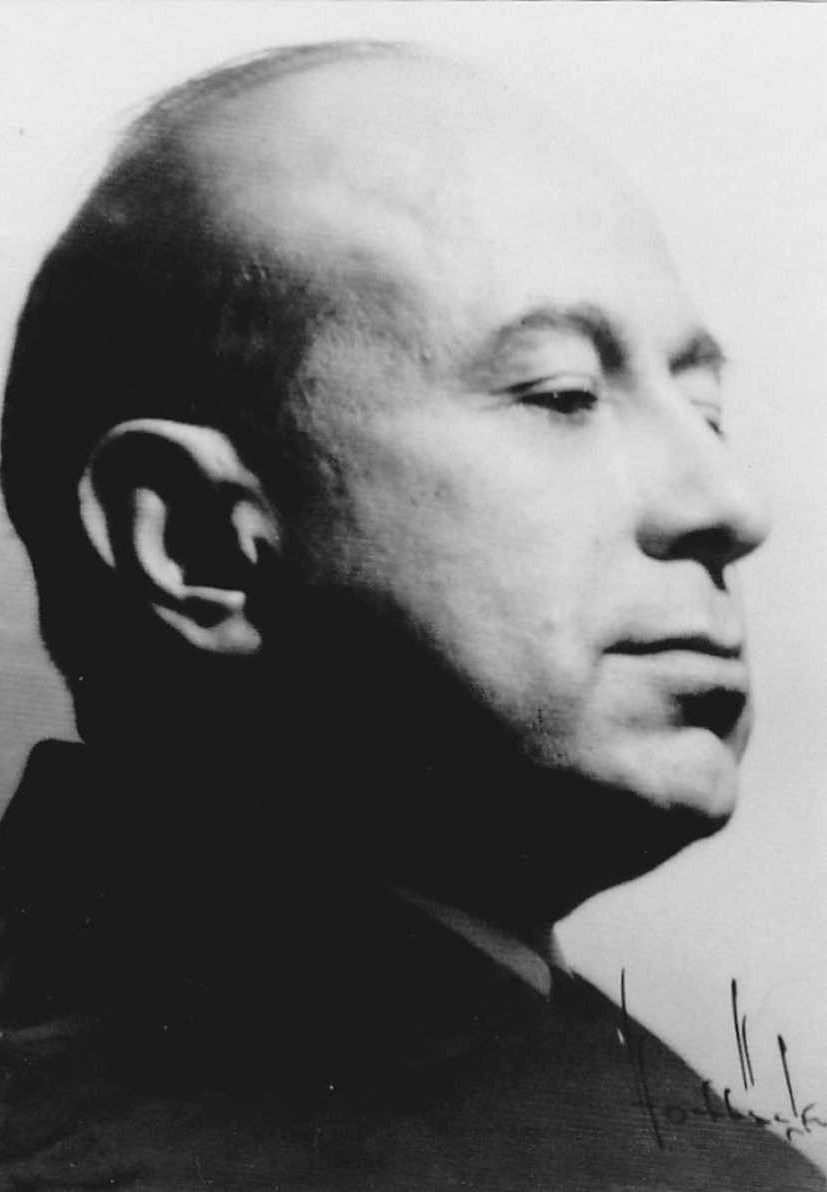
Bernardo Navajas Trigo –
Minister of Government (PL)

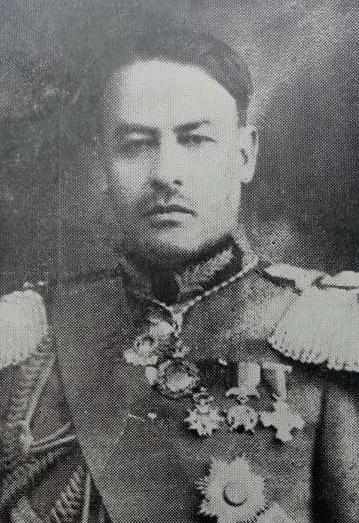
Carlos Blanco Galindo –
Minister of National Defense

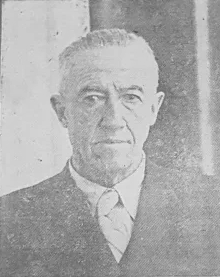
Luis Calvo –
Minister of Finance (PRG)

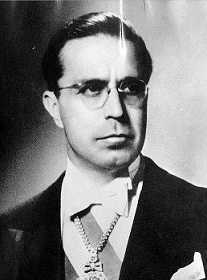
Víctor Paz Estenssoro –
Minister of Economy (PSI)

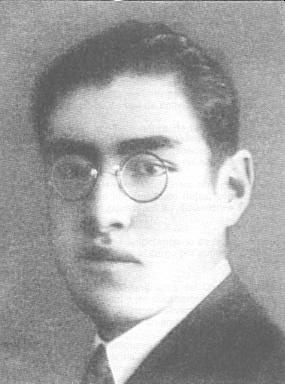
Justo Rodas Eguino –
Minister of Public Works (PRS)

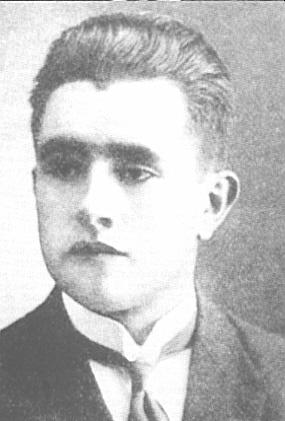
Juan Manuel Balcázar –
Minister of Work and Health (PRS)

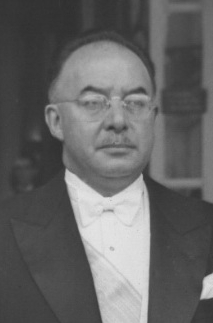
Enrique Hertzog –
Minister of Work and Health (PRG)

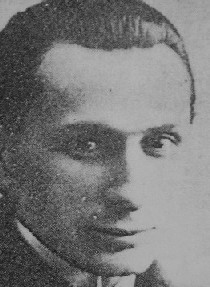
Gustavo Adolfo Otero –
Minister of Education

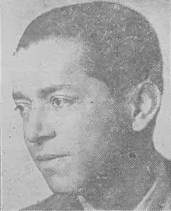
Rubén Terrazas –
Minister of Education (PRG)

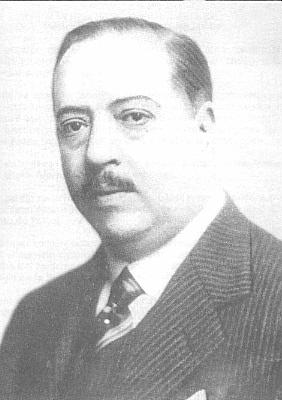
Arturo Pinto –
Minister of Education (PRG)

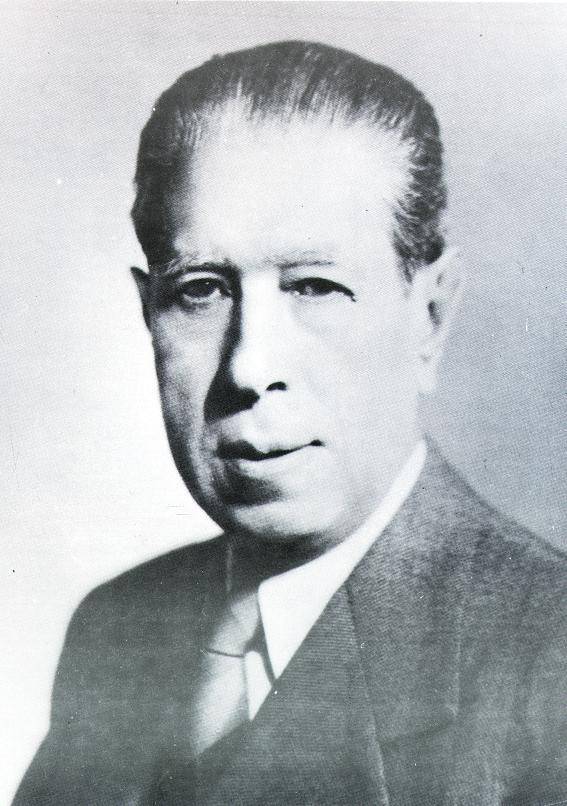
Alcides Arguedas –
Minister of Agriculture (PL)

== Bibliography ==
- Gisbert, Carlos D. Mesa (2003). Presidentes de Bolivia: entre urnas y fusiles : el poder ejecutivo, los ministros de estado (in Spanish). Editorial Gisbert. pp. 344–346.
