= 1938 Bolivian National Convention =

1938 National Convention of Bolivia Convención Nacional de Bolivia de 1938

Type
- Type: Unicameral
- Houses: Chamber of Senators, Chamber of Deputies

History
- Preceded by: 1931–36 Congress
- Succeeded by: 1940–42 Congress

Leadership
- President of the National Convention: Renato Riverín, FPP since 23 May 1938

Structure
- Seats: 103; 18 Senators; 103 Deputies
- Chamber of Senators political groups: FUS (18): PL (8); PRS (4); FPP (2); ??? (4)
- Chamber of Deputies political groups: FUS (96): PSU (19); PSI (7); PRS (6); PL (3); FPP (2); PO (1); POR (1); LEC (1); ??? (58); Ind. (7) Ind. clerics (2)

Elections
- Chamber of Senators voting system: Party-list proportional representation
- Chamber of Deputies voting system: Additional Member System
- Last Chamber of Senators election: 13 March 1938
- Last Chamber of Deputies election: 13 March 1938
- Next Chamber of Senators election: 10 March 1940
- Next Chamber of Deputies election: 10 March 1940

Meeting place
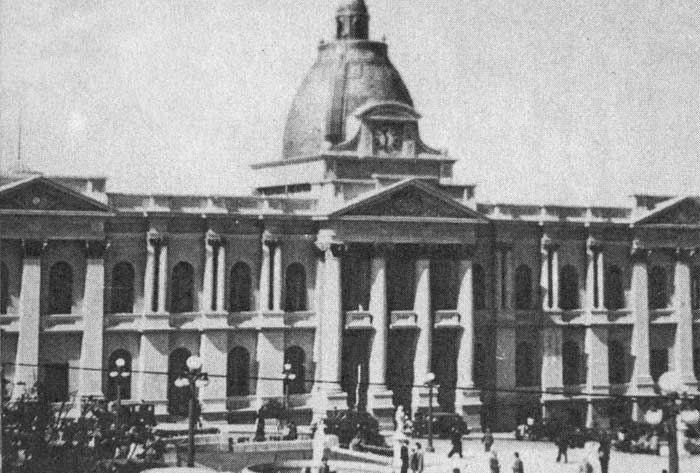
- Legislative Palace

The 1938 Bolivian National Convention was a meeting of the unicameral Bolivian legislature composed of an elected constituent assembly made up of the Chamber of Senators and Chamber of Deputies. It met in La Paz from 25 May to 30 October 1938 and was charged with rewriting the Constitution of Bolivia. President David Toro had called for the National Convention in 1937, but by the time it was held he had been forced to resign in a coup d'état which brought the young lieutenant colonel Germán Busch to power on 13 July 1937.

The Congress was elected as part of that year's legislative election. Voter rolls for electing convention members were opened in August 1937 and the vote was held on 13 March 1938.

== Background ==
President David Toro, who called the National Convention, had presided over a clearly left-wing ideology known as Military Socialism. His successor Germán Busch, however, was politically enigmatic with both the left and the right alike assuming he would reverse course from the leftist Toro back to the traditional conservatism of the pre-Chaco War establishment.

The coming assembly was the first national legislative body to meet in Bolivia in over three years. With it, the traditional establishment parties (The Liberals and the Genuine and Socialist Republicans) hoped to reassert themselves in national politics. However, the Busch regime soon took a left-wing political stance, implementing the Toro-era concept of union representation in government by allowing the Trade Union Confederation of Bolivian Workers (CSTB) and the Legion of Veterans (LEC) to present candidates in the legislative elections.

Soon, the CSTB and LEC joined with multiple left-wing parties, from the moderate socialist United Socialist Party (PSU) to the more radical Independent Socialist Party (PSI), and formed the Socialist Single Front (FUS), a united electoral alliance backed by the Busch government. Faced with a unified left-wing coalition, the traditional parties withdrew from the elections, save for the Socialist Republicans who joined with the FUS and certain dissident Liberals who chose to collaborate with the new regime.

With the path to victory cleared, the FUS won the 1938 legislative election in a landslide, winning all 18 seats in the Chamber of Senators and 96 of the 103 seats in the Chamber of Deputies with just 7 seats going to independents and 2 being won by independent clerics from La Paz. Thus, when the convention finally opened in May 1938, the so-called Generación del Chaco (Chaco Generation) finally and for the first time found itself with a national platform from which to constitute its ideas into law.

== The Convention ==
The National Convention opened on 25 May 1938, electing Renato Riverín of the Popular Front of Potosí (FPP) as its president. It was the first time workers were included in a Bolivian constituent assembly. The convention dominated the political scene nationwide, becoming the debate grounds of ideologues and thinkers of the entire left-wing spectrum, from moderate socialists to economic nationalists and hard line Marxist labor leaders.

=== Presidential election ===
One of the first acts of the new assembly was to formally elect Germán Busch constitutional president on 27 May. Enrique Baldivieso, a deputy for Potosí and the leader of the United Socialist Party, was elected vice president. The pair were formally inaugurated as part of a national holiday the following day with terms set to last until 6 August 1942.

=== 1938 Constitution ===
With its dominant position in the assembly, the left-wing quickly overpowered more conservative elements, rejecting liberal concepts of limited government and laissez-faire which had shaped the entire constitutional history of Bolivia. The classical Constitution of 1880 would be thrown out and the new one written under the guidelines of a revolutionary concept known as "social constitutionalism" in which the State was given the expanded role of providing for the economic and social needs of the population. At the same time, the concept of private property was reworded, limiting it from a natural right to a government-given right which was granted only so long as it fulfilled a "social function".

The new constitution also provided for many benefits and securities for organized labor which would now enjoy the direct protection of the State. Annual paid leave, a minimum wage, insurance for accidents and disability, and guarantees for unions were all included. The legal existence of indigenous communities was also recognized.

The so-called "Labor Sector" which represented the most extreme left of the convention also called for full-scale land reform. The leader of the Independent Socialists, the Tarijeño deputy Víctor Paz Estenssoro, also called for complete government control of the country's expansive tin industry, which up until then had been dominated by the tin barons of the mining oligarchy. While these more radical reforms were shot down, they received a voice on the national stage for the very first time.

Finally, after months of deliberation and debate, the Political Constitution of 1938 was promulgated on 30 October.

== Aftermath ==
For all its successes and contributions, one notable absence from the Convention was President Germán Busch himself. Politically naïve, Busch contributed little to the writing of the new Constitution. The Socialist Single Front, which created a united front of the left-wing parties, only lasted through the legislative elections. From there, the different factions of the left remained in a state of instability, forming and breaking apart from one another in their attempts to create a viable political coalition. Despite attempts by Renato Riverín and Busch's advisor Gabriel Gosálvez to form a government-backed Socialist Party, it suffered from a lack of commitment on the part of Busch and collapsed entirely when Vicente Leyton, his own Minister of Government, refused to join it.

Further fracturing occurred on 19 January 1939 when nine deputies and three senators announced the formation of the Eastern Socialist Party (PSO), also known as the Orientalist Party. The new party was aligned with the traditional liberalism of the pre-Chaco War parties and its political program expressed its intent to "proclaim the intangibility of the Eastern territory" and "to accept as a basic principle the integrity of each of the eastern departments, leaving established their historical and racial identity." For these reasons it was described by its critics as both "regionalist" and "racist" and was condemned by various social and cultural institutions, regional centers, trade union organizations, veterans, journalists, and even the Liberal Party.

Nevertheless, the PSO on 1 February appealed for President Busch to join. However, on 14 February Busch warned that the "founding [of] a regionalist party [...] constitutes an attack against national unity." Busch's harsh condemnation came amidst calls that the members of the PSO be expelled from the legislature. Given the weight of the pressure and "In compliance with the order of His Excellency Mr. President," the PSO was dissolved on 18 February, less than a month after its formation.

The PSO was the last attempt made by the more traditionally-oriented parties to ally themselves with the Busch government. Just a month later on 22 March, the Liberals and both Republican parties broke with their previous policy of interacting with the fringes of the moderate left and formed the Concordance coalition in direct opposition to the government. The Concordance came forth demanding the end of military involvement in government and announced their intent to present candidates for the May legislative elections.

As a result, the left-wing stood without a united front against the resurgent and combined traditional parties, resulting in a bleak outlook on the coming legislative elections. Finally, tired of political manoeuvring and disappointed with the lack of results his regime had produced, Busch took matters into his own hands. On 24 April 1939, Busch declared totalitarian rule in a self-coup to the shock of the nation. The May legislative elections were cancelled and the assembly was permanently adjourned, bringing an end to the only legislature of the military socialist era.

== Leadership ==
=== National Convention ===
- President: Renato Riverín (FPP), from 25 May 1938
  - First Vice President: Alfredo Mollinedo (PRS)
    - Secretary: Agustín Landívar Zambrana
    - Secretary: Augusto Guzmán (PSU)
    - Secretary: Roberto Jordán Cuéllar (PRS)
    - Secretary: Jesús Lijerón Rodríguez (Ind.)

== Composition ==
Vice President

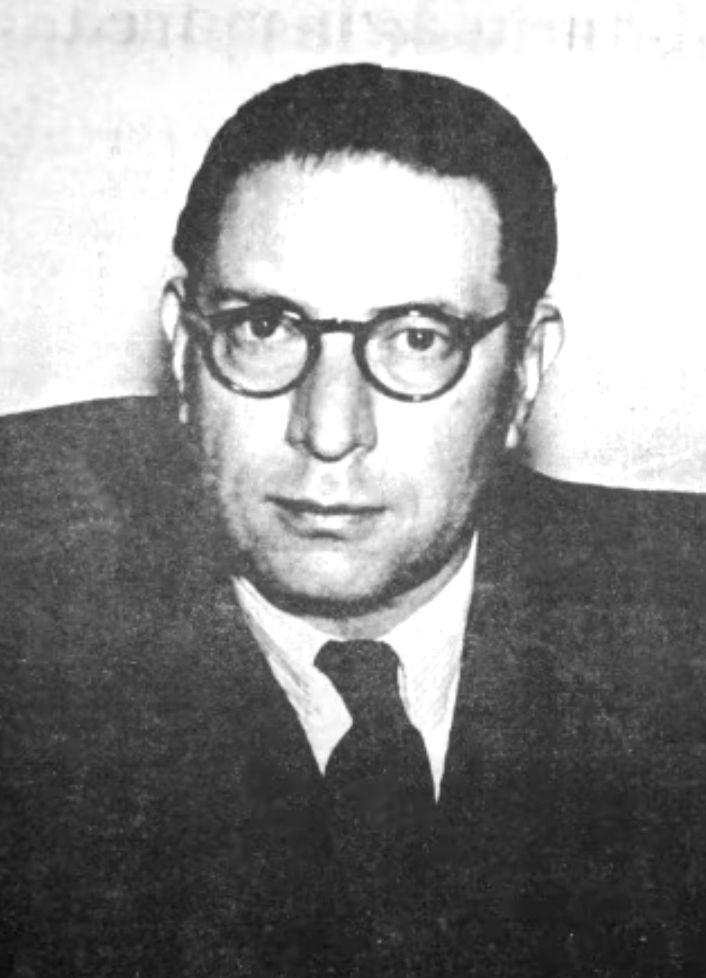
Enrique Baldivieso (PSU)

National Convention President

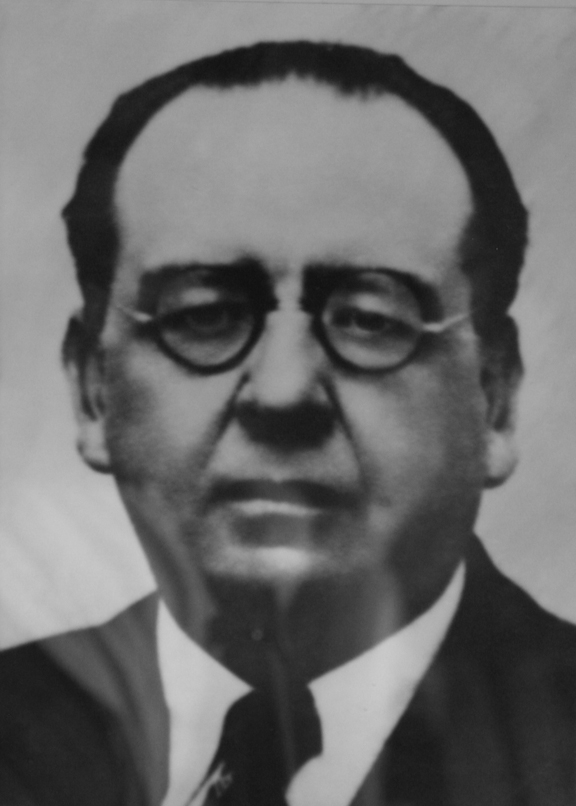
Renato Riverín (FPP)

=== Chamber of Senators ===
1938 members of the Chamber of Senators:

Senator	Department	Party
Gregorio Mendizábal	Chuquisaca	PRS
Sebastián García Agreda	Chuquisaca	???
Eduardo Rodríguez Vásquez	La Paz	PL
José P. Bilbao Llano	La Paz	???
José Antezana	Cochabamba	PL
Otoniel Quiroga	Cochabamba	PRS
Luis Herrero	Oruro	PRS
Ricardo Rivera	Oruro	???
Carlos Medinaceli	Potosí	FPP
Renato Riverín	Potosí	FPP
Bernardo Navajas Trigo	Tarija	PL
Julio Pantoja Estenssoro	Tarija	PRS
Germán Chávez	Santa Cruz	PL
Germán Chávez	Santa Cruz	PSO (Note: From 19 January – 18 February 1939)
Julio Salmón	Santa Cruz	PL
Napoleón Solares Arias	Beni	PL
Napoleón Solares Arias	Beni	PSO
Sócrates Parada Suárez	Beni	PL
Sócrates Parada Suárez	Beni	PSO
Gregorio Balcázar	Pando	???
Pablo Saucedo Barbery	Pando	PL

=== Chamber of Deputies ===
1938 members of the Chamber of Deputies:

Deputy	Department	Constituency	Party
Adrián Camacho Porcel	Chuquisaca	Oropeza	PSU
Alberto Berdeja	Chuquisaca	Sucre	???
Alberto Echazú	Chuquisaca	Sucre	???
Alberto Zelada	Chuquisaca	Sucre	???
Desiderio M. Rivera	Chuquisaca	Nor Cinti	PSU
Enrique Reyes Barrón	Chuquisaca	Tomina	???
Esteban Durán	Chuquisaca	Sucre	???
Germán Pareja	Chuquisaca	Sud Cinti	???
Jorge Arana Urioste	Chuquisaca	Yamparáez	???
José Romero Loza	Chuquisaca	Azurduy	PSU
Óscar Emilio Arauz	Chuquisaca	Zudáñez	LEC
Ricardo Gambarte	Chuquisaca	El Azero	???
Adolfo Paco Careaga	La Paz	Sica Sica	???
Adrián Oblitas	La Paz	Muñecas	???
Alfredo Mollinedo	La Paz	La Paz	PRS
Carlos Gómez Cornejo	La Paz	Loayza	PRS
Carlos Machicao	La Paz	Ingavi	PRS
Federico Román	La Paz	Sud Yungas	LEC
Félix Eguino Zaballa	La Paz	Omasuyos	PSU
Félix Vargas Soto	La Paz	Inquisivi	PRS
Humberto del Solar	La Paz	Los Andes	???
Jorge Ballón Saravia	La Paz	Murillo	PSU
José Bascón	La Paz	Larecaja	???
Luis Alberto Tapia	La Paz	La Paz	???
Luis Barbery	La Paz	Iturralde	???
Nazario Pardo Valle	La Paz	Caupolicán	PSU
Rigoberto Villarroel Claure	La Paz	Pacajes	???
Rufino Saldaña	La Paz	Nor Yungas	???
Tomás Chávez Lobatón	La Paz	La Paz	Ind.
Waldo Álvarez	La Paz	La Paz	PO
Wálter Portillo	La Paz	Camacho	???
Ángel Jordán	Cochabamba	Cliza	???
Augusto Céspedes	Cochabamba	Cochabamba	PSI
Augusto Guzmán	Cochabamba	Cochabamba	PSU
David Ardaya	Cochabamba	Punata	???
Felipe Ayala Gamboa	Cochabamba	Cochabamba	PSU
Humberto Montaño	Cochabamba	Cochabamba	???
Jorge Mercado Rosales	Cochabamba	Quillacollo	PSU
José Anaya	Cochabamba	Tarata	???
José Antonio Camacho	Cochabamba	Campero	POR
José Antonio Zegada	Cochabamba	Mizque	???
José Enrique Peña	Cochabamba	Chapare	???
Julio Espinoza	Cochabamba	Ayopaya	PSI
Lucio Vargas Díaz	Cochabamba	Arque	PRS
Luis Felipe Guzmán	Cochabamba	Capinota	PL
Rodolfo Costas	Cochabamba	Carrasco	PSI
Rodolfo Soriano	Cochabamba	Tapacarí	PSU
Wálter Guevara	Cochabamba	Aran	PSI
Abel Leyes	Oruro	Abaroa	PSU
Ángel Mendizábal	Oruro	Oruro	PL
Armando Renjel	Oruro	Poopó	???
Eduardo Fajardo	Oruro	Oruro	???
Enrique Liendo	Oruro	Oruro	???
Julián Montellano	Oruro	Carangas	PSI
Telesforo Morales	Oruro	Oruro	???
Trifonio Delgado	Oruro	Huanuni	PRS
Alfredo Arratia	Potosí	Potosí	FPP
Carlos Cortez	Potosí	Quijarro	???
Carlos Gregorio Taborga	Potosí	Chayanta	???
Corsino Rodríguez Quiroga	Potosí	Potosí	???
Emilio Sejas	Potosí	Bustillo	???
Enrique Baldivieso	Potosí	Sud Chichas	PSU
Eustaquio Bilbao Rioja	Potosí	Alonso de Ibáñez	???
Fernando Siñani	Potosí	Sud Lípez	FPP
Gastón Pacheco	Potosí	Potosí	???
Guillermo Rivero	Potosí	Potosí	PSU
José María Cortez	Potosí	Nor Chichas	???
Julio Velasco G.	Potosí	Nor Lípez	???
Lucio Lanza Solares	Potosí	Potosí	PRS
Luis Ossio Ruiz	Potosí	Linares	PSU
Severo Clavijo Suárez	Potosí	Cornelio Saavedra	???
Abel Márquez	Tarija	Tarija	???
Antonio Campero Arce	Tarija	Méndez	PSU
Antonio Mogro Moreno	Tarija	Avilés	???
Gustavo Auzza	Tarija	Tarija	PRS
Hugo Pizarro Aráoz	Tarija	O'Connor	???
Jorge Aráoz Campero	Tarija	Tarija	PSI
Víctor Paz Estenssoro	Tarija	Tarija	PSI
Adolfo Román	Santa Cruz	Santa Cruz	???
Agustín Landívar Zambrana	Santa Cruz	Warnes	???
Aquino Ibáñez Coruco	Santa Cruz	Chiquitos	???
Facundo Flores Jiménez	Santa Cruz	Velasco	PSU
Facundo Flores Jiménez	Santa Cruz	Velasco	PSO
Fernando Justiniano	Santa Cruz	Ñuflo de Chávez	???
Francisco Hurtado	Santa Cruz	Cordillera	???
Francisco Hurtado	Santa Cruz	Cordillera	PSO
José Daniel Antelo	Santa Cruz	Sara	???
José Daniel Antelo	Santa Cruz	Sara	PSO
José Serrate	Santa Cruz	Ichilo	???
Mario Ortiz Suárez	Santa Cruz	Santa Cruz	???
Mario Ortiz Suárez	Santa Cruz	Santa Cruz	PSO
Roberto Prado	Santa Cruz	Vallegrande	???
Sixto Montero Hoyos	Santa Cruz	Florida	???
Sixto Montero Hoyos	Santa Cruz	Florida	PSO
Wálter Suárez Landívar	Santa Cruz	Santa Cruz	???
Wálter Suárez Landívar	Santa Cruz	Santa Cruz	PSO
Adolfo Aponte	Beni	Yacuma	Ind.
Antonio Munguía	Beni	Trinidad	PSU
Augusto Chávez C.	Beni	Trinidad	???
Gonzalo Cuéllar Jiménez	Beni	Iténez	???
Gonzalo Suárez Dorado	Beni	Trinidad	???
Gonzalo Suárez Dorado	Beni	Trinidad	PSO
Jesús Lijerón Rodríguez	Beni	Trinidad	Ind.
Jesús Rioja Aponte	Beni	Marbán	???
Jesús Rioja Aponte	Beni	Marbán	PSO
Juan Manuel Suárez	Beni	Ballivián	Ind.
Nataniel García Chávez	Beni	Vaca Díez	???
Adolfo Leigue	Pando	Puerto Rico	???
Ismael Zuazo	Pando	Porvenir	???
Ismael Zuazo	Pando	Porvenir	PSO
José Chávez Suárez	Pando	Cobija	PL
Roberto Jordán Cuéllar	Pando	Cobija	PRS

== Bibliography ==
- Klein, Herbert S. (May 1967). "Germán Busch and the Era of "Military Socialism" in Bolivia". The Hispanic American Historical Review. XLVII (2): 166–184. Archived from the original on 7 October 2021.
- Querejazu Calvo, Roberto (1977). Llallagua: historia de una montaña (PDF).
