= 1940–1942 Bolivian National Congress =

1940–1942 Term of the National Congress Congreso Nacional

Type
- Type: Bicameral
- Houses: Chamber of Senators, Chamber of Deputies

History
- Preceded by: 1938 National Convention
- Succeeded by: 1942–44 Congress

Leadership
- President of the Senate: Alberto Saavedra Nogales, PRS since 12 April 1940
- Arturo Galindo, PL since October 1940
- Waldo Belmonte Pool, PRS since November 1941
- President of the Chamber of Deputies: Rafael de Ugarte, PRG since 12 April 1940
- Jorge Aráoz Campero, PSI since August 1941

Structure
- Seats: 136; 27 Senators; 109 Deputies
- Chamber of Senators political groups: CONC (23): PRS (11); PL (9); PRG (3); PSU (4)
- Chamber of Deputies political groups: CONC (50): PL (21); PRG (17); PRS (12); PR (1); PSU (18); PSI (15); FPP (4); FSB Ind. (1); PSOB (1); Left-wing Ind. (10) Right-wing Ind. (9)

Elections
- Chamber of Senators voting system: Party-list proportional representation
- Chamber of Deputies voting system: Additional Member System
- Last Chamber of Senators election: 10 March 1940
- Last Chamber of Deputies election: 10 March 1940
- Next Chamber of Senators election: March 1942
- Next Chamber of Deputies election: March 1942

Meeting place
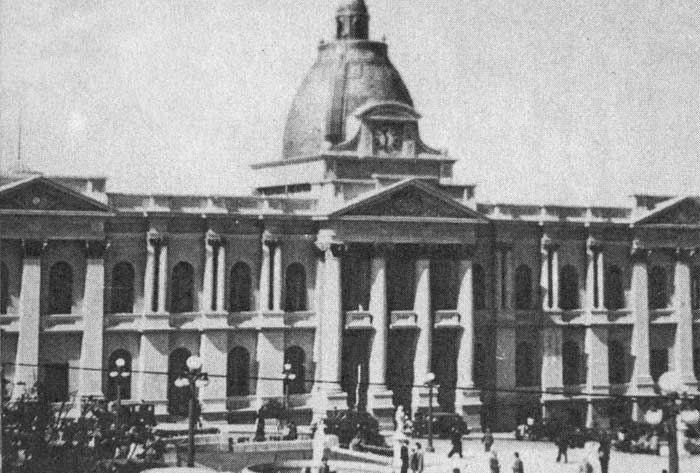
- Legislative Palace

Senate President

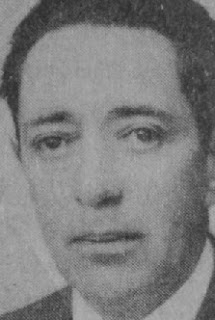
Alberto Saavedra Nogales (PRS), until October 1949

The 1940–42 Bolivian National Congress was a meeting the Bolivian legislature composed of the Chamber of Senators and Chamber of Deputies. It met in La Paz from 12 April 1940 to 1942 during the final four days of the interim government of Carlos Quintanilla and the first two years of the Enrique Peñaranda's presidency.

The Congress was elected as part of the general election held on 10 March 1940.

== Leadership ==
=== Chamber of Senators ===
- President: Alberto Saavedra Nogales (PRS), until October 1949
  - Arturo Galindo (PL), until November 1941
  - Walter Belmonte Pool (PRS), from November 1941

=== Chamber of Deputies ===
- President: Rafael de Ugarte (PRG), until August 1941
  - Jorge Aráoz Campero (PSI), from August 1941

== Composition ==
Senate President

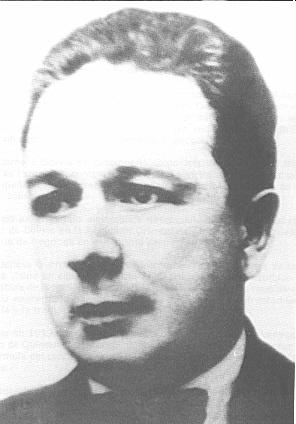
Waldo Belmonte Pool (PRS),
from November 1941

Chamber President

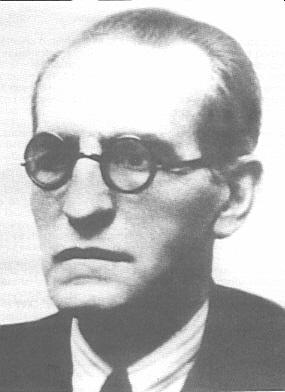
Rafael de Ugarte (PRG),
until August 1941

=== Chamber of Senators ===
1940–1942 members of the Chamber of Senators:

Senator	Department	Party
Adolfo Vilar Mendivil	Chuquisaca	PL
Mamerto Urriolagoitía	Chuquisaca	PSU
Pedro Zilveti Arce	Chuquisaca	PRS
Abdón Saavedra	La Paz	PRS
Alcides Arguedas	La Paz	PL
Waldo Belmonte Pool	La Paz	PRS
Arturo Galindo	Cochabamba	PL
Félix Capriles	Cochabamba	PSU
Manuel Carrasco Jimenez	Cochabamba	PL
Carlos Beltrán Morales	Oruro	PSU
Edmundo Vásquez	Oruro	PRS
Julio Quintanilla	Oruro	PL
Alberto Saavedra Nogales	Potosí	PRS
Juan Manuel Balcázar	Potosí	PRS
Luis Calvo	Potosí	PRG
Bernardo Navajas Trigo	Tarija	PL
Julio Pantoja Estenssoro	Tarija	PRS
Manuel Mogro Moreno	Tarija	PRS
Alfredo Jordán	Santa Cruz	PL
José Gil Soruco	Santa Cruz	PRS
Rubén Terrazas	Santa Cruz	PRG
Eduardo Roca	Beni	PSU
Julio Céspedes Añez	Beni	PRS
Napoleón Solares Arias	Beni	PL
Fabián Vaca Chávez	Pando	PRG
Oscar Mariaca Pando	Pando	PL
Rómulo Arano Peredo	Pando	PRS

=== Chamber of Deputies ===
1940–1942 members of the Chamber of Deputies:

Deputy	Department	Party
Alberto Salinas López	Chuquisaca	PSU
Daniel Gamarra	Chuquisaca	PRG
Desiderio M. Rivera	Chuquisaca	PSU
Fernando Ortíz Pacheco	Chuquisaca	PRG
Fructuoso Ramos	Chuquisaca	PSU
Gustavo Adolfo Navarro	Chuquisaca	PSOB
José Félix Mercado	Chuquisaca	PSI
Julio Harriague	Chuquisaca	PL
Miguel Muñoz	Chuquisaca	PRG
Rafael Alarcón Pacheco	Chuquisaca	PRG
Rogelio Arce	Chuquisaca	PL
Zenobio Sánchez	Chuquisaca	PL
Alfredo Guillen Pinto	La Paz	PRG
Carlos Gonzalo de Saavedra	La Paz	PRS
Claudio Zuazo	La Paz	PR
Daniel Ortíz M.	La Paz	PL
Félix Eguino Zaballa	La Paz	PSU
Fernando Iturralde Chinel	La Paz	PSI
Gabriel Levy	La Paz	PRS
Germán Monroy Block	La Paz	PSI
Isaac Salazar y P.	La Paz	PSU
José María Salinas	La Paz	Ind.
Julio Agudo	La Paz	PRG
Max Mendoza López	La Paz	PRS
Nazario Pardo Valle	La Paz	PSU
Nicolás Rodas Peñaloza	La Paz	Ind.
Rafael Otazo V.	La Paz	PSI
Remy Rodas Eguino	La Paz	PRS
Teodomiro Urquiola	La Paz	PRS
Tomas Chávez Lobatón	La Paz	Ind.
Víctor Andrade	La Paz	Ind.
Abraham Bascopé	Cochabamba	PRG
Carlos Puente	Cochabamba	Ind.
Carlos Salamanca F.	Cochabamba	PSI
Carlos Walter Urquidi	Cochabamba	Ind.
Daniel Iriarte	Cochabamba	PRG
Guillermo Viscarra	Cochabamba	PSU
Joaquín Espada	Cochabamba	PRG
Jorge Mercado Rosales	Cochabamba	PSU
Juan José Carrasco	Cochabamba	PRS
Julio Espinoza	Cochabamba	PSI
Luís Ponce Lozada	Cochabamba	PRG
Néstor V. Galindo	Cochabamba	PL
Rafael de Ugarte	Cochabamba	PRG
Rodolfo Soriano	Cochabamba	PSI
Rolando Rivero Torres	Cochabamba	PRS
Víctor Cabrera Lozada	Cochabamba	PRG
Walker Humérez	Cochabamba	PRS
Abel Leyes	Oruro	PSU
Angel Mendizábal	Oruro	PL
Demetrio Canelas	Oruro	PRG
Fernando Loayza Beltrán	Oruro	Ind.
Guillermo Liendo	Oruro	PRS
Jacinto Rodríguez	Oruro	PL
Julio Romano	Oruro	PSI
Roberto Gómez Olivares	Oruro	PSU
Abelardo Villalpando	Potosí	FPP
Agustín Zuleta	Potosí	PSU
Alfredo Arratia	Potosí	FPP
Arturo Pinto Escalier	Potosí	PRG
Eduardo del Portillo	Potosí	Ind.
Fernando Siñani	Potosí	FPP
Humberto Duchén	Potosí	PL
Julio Tumiri Javier	Potosí	Ind.
Justo Gardeazábal	Potosí	PRS
Miguel Mercado Moreira	Potosí	PL
Rafael Tufiño	Potosí	PL
Raúl Jordán Velasco	Potosí	Ind.
Raúl Ruíz González	Potosí	FPP
Ricardo Tapia Bravo	Potosí	Ind.
Roberto González Aramayo	Potosí	PSU
Alberto Rodo R.	Tarija	PSI
Alberto Sánchez Rossel	Tarija	PSI
Augusto León	Tarija	PL
Francisco Lazcano Soruco	Tarija	PSU
Genaro Vásquez	Tarija	PL
Héctor Pinto Echazú	Tarija	PSI
Jorge Aráoz Campero	Tarija	PSI
José María Paz	Tarija	PSI
Víctor Paz Estenssoro	Tarija	PSI
Adrián Barrientes Franco	Santa Cruz	PL
Celso Castedo	Santa Cruz	PRS
Ernesto Monasterios	Santa Cruz	PRG
Facundo Flores Jiménez	Santa Cruz	PSU
Felipe Baldomar	Santa Cruz	Ind.
Guillermo Rivero	Santa Cruz	PSU
Héctor Suárez Santisteban	Santa Cruz	PRS
Horacio Sosa	Santa Cruz	PL
José Parada Suárez	Santa Cruz	PL
Julio Landívar Moreno	Santa Cruz	PL
Luís Saavedra Suárez	Santa Cruz	PSU
Pedro Montano	Santa Cruz	PRG
Virgilio Serrate	Santa Cruz	PRG
Alfredo Morant	Beni	Ind.
Antonio Munguía	Beni	PSU
Antonio Velasco Avila	Beni	Ind.
Jesús Lijerón Rodríguez	Beni	Ind.
José Chávez Suárez	Beni	PL
Juan Manuel Suárez	Beni	Ind.
Napoleón Añez	Beni	Ind.
Pablo Saucedo Barbery	Beni	PL
Sócrates Parada Suárez	Beni	PL
Adolfo Aponte	Pando	Ind.
Eugenio von Boeck	Pando	Ind.
Germán Chávez	Pando	PL
Juan Granier Chirveches	Pando	PL
Roberto Jordán Cuéllar	Pando	PSU
Roberto Prudencio Romecín	Pando	PSI
Tomás Paz Caballero	Pando	Ind.
