= 1938 Bolivian legislative election =

Constituent Assembly elections were held in Bolivia on 13 March 1938. Prior to the elections, an electoral alliance named the Socialist Single Front (FUS) was formed by the Legion of Veterans, Confederation of Bolivian Workers, Workers' Party, Popular Front of Potosí, United Socialist Party, Republican Socialist Party, and Independent Socialist Party. The FUS won 96 of the 103 seats in the Chamber of Deputies and all 18 seats in the Senate.

== Results ==
Party	Seats	
Party	Chamber	Senate
Socialist Single Front	96	18
Independent clericals from La Paz	2	0
Independents	5	0
Total	103	18

== Aftermath ==
On 27 May 1938 the Constituent Assembly elected Germán Busch as president. Busch had assumed the presidency on 13 July 1937 as a result of a coup d'état.

The Assembly was dissolved by Busch on 24 April 1939.

== See also ==
- Bolivian Constituent Assembly, 1938–1939
