= Constitutional history of Bolivia =

Bolivia has had seventeen constitutions, including the present one, since its foundation in 1825.

== List of constitutions ==
The Constitution and the Bolivian presidential system
No.	Date	Promulgated	Per.	V.P.	Reelection	Syst.	Constituent body	Ref.
1	19 November 1826	Sucre	For life	Yes	–	S.E.L.P.	Constituent Congress	
2	14 August 1831	Santa Cruz	4 years	Yes	Yes	S.P.E.J.P.	Constituent Assembly	
3	20 October 1834	Santa Cruz	4 years	Yes	Yes	S.P.E.J.P.	Constituent Assembly	
4	26 October 1839	Velasco	4 years	No (P.Sen.)	No (1 term)	Direct qualified vote	Constituent Assembly	
5	17 June 1843	Ballivián	8 years	No (P.N.C.)	No (1 term)	Popular vote	National Convention	
6	21 September 1851	Belzu	5 years	No (P.C.M.)	No (1 term)	Direct qualified vote	National Convention	
7	5 August 1861	Acha	3 years	No (P.C.S.)	No (1 term)	Direct qualified vote	Constituent Assembly	
8	1 October 1868	Melgarejo	4 years	No (P.Sen.)	Yes	Direct qualified vote	Constituent Assembly	
9	18 October 1871	Morales	4 years	No (P.C.S.)	No (1 term)	Direct qualified vote	Constituent Assembly	
10	15 February 1878	Daza	4 years	Yes	No (1 term)	Direct qualified vote	Constituent Assembly	
11	28 October 1880	Campero	4 years	Yes (2 V.P.)	No (1 term)	Direct qualified vote	National Convention	
–	24 January 1921 (Note: Constitutional reform by National Convention.)	Junta	4 years	Yes	No (1 term)	Direct qualified vote	National Convention	
–	23 February 1931 (Note: Constitutional reform by referendum.)	Blanco Galindo (J)	4 years	Yes	No (2 terms)	Direct qualified vote	Referendum	
12	30 October 1938	Busch	4 years	Yes	No (1 term)	Direct qualified vote	National Convention	
–	4 December 1939 (Note: Constitutional reform by Supreme Decree.)	Quintanilla	4 years	No (P.Sen.)	No (1 term)	Direct qualified vote	Supreme Decree	
13	24 November 1945	Villarroel	6 years	Yes	No (1 term)	Direct qualified vote	Congressional Convention	
14	26 November 1947	Hertzog	4 years	Yes	No (1 term)	Direct qualified vote	Constituent Congress	
15	4 August 1961	Paz Estenssoro	4 years	Yes	Yes	Direct universal vote	Constituent Congress	
16	2 February 1967	Barrientos	4 years	Yes	No (1 term)	Direct universal vote	Constituent Assembly	
–	12 August 1994 (Note: Constitutional reform by National Congress. Further reforms occurred in 1995, 2002, 2004, and 2005.)	Sánchez de Lozada	5 years	Yes	No (1 term)	Direct universal vote	Constituent Congress	
17	7 February 2009	Morales	5 years	Yes	Yes	Direct universal vote	Constituent Assembly; Referendum	

== Early history ==
The Constituent Assembly that founded Bolivia in 1825 wrote the nation's first constitution establishing a centralized government with executive, legislative, and judicial branches. Based on the United States Constitution and borrowing a few premises from the French Republic, the first charter adopted liberal and representative democracy granting the congress autonomy and policy-making prerogatives. This constitution, however, was never adopted.

On November 26, 1826, the Bolivarian Constitution, written in Lima by the liberator Simón Bolívar Palacio, replaced the original document and instituted a fourfold separation of powers among a lifetime presidency, an independent judiciary, a tricameral congress, and an electoral body. The tricameral congress comprised the Senate and the Chamber of Tribunes, whose members had fixed terms, as well as a Chamber of Censors, whose members served for life. Theoretically, the Senate was responsible for codifying laws and reorienting church and court officials, the Chamber of Tribunes possessed general legislative powers, and the Chamber of Censors had oversight powers that included impeachment of members of the executive. In reality, the legislature's key functions were to name the president and to approve a list of successors submitted by the president. One of the long-lasting effects of the Bolivarian constitution was the establishment of an executive-based system. The Bolivarian constitution reflected the Spanish tradition of bureaucratic patrimonialism in which power rested in the executive branch.

In many ways, the Bolivarian constitution reflected Bolívar's desire to prevent rule by the masses. As a result, the franchise was extended only to those literate in Spanish who either possessed property then worth 400 bolivianos or engaged in an art, in a science, or in some other remunerative position. Domestic and personal servants were also denied the franchise. In short, voting rights were limited to a very small and privileged elite. Voting qualifications and restrictions remained until universal suffrage was adopted during the 1952 Revolution. Bolívar also feared that rival elite factions would wage battle against each other for control over the new nation and became convinced that the best way to prevent instability and chaos was to institutionalize a strong, centralized, and lifetime presidency.

However, the Bolivarian constitution did not last long because of the great disparity that existed between the national aspirations of the state and its effective power over Bolivia's disparate regions and population. Between 1825 and 1880, Bolivian political life was dominated by a series of quasi-military leaders, known as caudillos, who had emerged with the collapse of the Spanish Empire. Within the context of economic crisis, warring caudillos, and a semifeudal social structure, constitutions and the national government became prizes to be captured by one or another caudillo.

Under the presidency of General Andrés de Santa Cruz y Calahumana, a new constitution was adopted on August 31, 1831. The new constitution introduced bicameralism, dividing the body between the Chamber of Senators (Senate) and the Chamber of Deputies elected by proportional representation. Annual sessions for the National Congress (hereafter, Congress) were to run between sixty and ninety days. Although the president was given the power to dissolve congress, the new constitution abolished the lifetime presidency and limited the president to renewable four-year terms. Despite these limitations, however, presidential power actually increased during the presidency of Santa Cruz, and the trend toward greater concentration of power in the executive continued throughout Bolivia's history.

Under the short-lived Peru-Bolivian Confederation of 1836–39, Santa Cruz promulgated a new constitution that basically applied the principles of the 1831 charter to the alliance. The end of the confederation motivated Santa Cruz to institutionalize the strong executive model embodied in the 1831 charter. Because the president was given the power to dissolve the legislature, Congress was condemned to a passive and submissive role.

For the next forty-two years, Bolivia was subjected to the whims of caudillos who dictated constitutional charters almost as regularly as changes of government occurred. Between 1839 and 1880, six constitutions were approved by the legislative power. Except for the constitution of 1839, which limited presidential power, the constitutions promulgated under José Ballivián y Segurola (1843), Manuel Isidoro Belzú Humérez (1851), José María Achá Valiente (1861), Mariano Melgarejo Valencia (1868), and Agustín Morales Hernández (1871) further concentrated power in the hands of the executive. As a rule, during this era Congress responded to the demands of whatever caudillo was in power.

== 1880 Constitution ==
Caudillo politics came to an end after the War of the Pacific (1879–80), in which the combined forces of Bolivia and Peru suffered a humiliating defeat against Chile's armed forces. The end of the war gave rise to a new mining elite oriented to laissez-faire capitalism. Aided by the failure of Bolivia's armed forces in the war effort, this new elite was able to design a new civilian regime of "order and progress."

In 1880 Bolivia's most durable constitution was approved; it was to remain in effect for the next fifty-eight years. Under this constitution, bicameralism was fully adopted, and the legislative power became an important arena for political debate. During this period, Bolivia achieved a functioning constitutional order complete with political parties, interest groups, and an active legislature. The country was also a prime example of a formal democracy with legally limited participation. Literacy and property requirements were still enforced to exclude the Indian population and the urban working class from politics. Political life was reserved for the privileged and a minuscule upper class.

The basic premises of representative democracy introduced in 1880 still prevailed in 1989. Specifically, congressional oversight prerogatives over executive behavior were introduced by law in 1884 when Bolivia emerged from the War of the Pacific. The Law Governing Trials of Responsibilities was to become an integral part of Bolivia's restricted democracy.

== Chaco War to 1952 Revolution ==
The economic crisis of the 1930s and the disastrous Chaco War (1932–35) exacerbated social tensions. The effects of the war would in turn have a dramatic effect on Bolivian political life and its institutions. Between 1935 and 1952, middle-class reformist efforts converged into populist movements led by both military officers and middle-class civilian intellectuals. Under Colonel Germán Busch Becerra (1937–39), a constituent assembly approved reforms in 1938 that were to have a lasting and profound impact on Bolivian society. Of greatest significance were changes that altered the pattern of relations between state and society. According to its provisions, human rights outweighed property rights, the national interest in the subsoil and its riches predominated, the state had a right to intervene in economic life and to regulate commerce, workers could organize and bargain collectively, and educational facilities for all children were mandated. The labor provision helped establish the basis for political parties by allowing the formation of miners' and peasants' unions that eventually played central roles in the 1952 Revolution.

Bolivia's constitution was again reformed in 1944 during the presidency of Colonel Gualberto Villarroel López (1943–46), another populist reformer. The principal changes included suffrage rights for women, but only in municipal elections, and the establishment of presidential and vice presidential terms of six years without immediate reelection. Reforms undertaken by military-populist governments, however, were partially rolled back following the overthrow and assassination of Villarroel in 1946. In 1947 a new constitution reduced the presidential term to four years and increased the powers of the Senate.

The post-Chaco War reformist efforts increased the role of the state, especially in terms of redressing social and economic grievances. The constitutions of this period reflected the rise of movements and groups that were to dominate Bolivian politics for the next forty years. For example, the Nationalist Revolutionary Movement (Movimiento Nacionalista Revolucionario—MNR) espoused a broad multiclass alliance of workers, peasants, and middle-class elements to do battle with the antinational forces of the mining oligarchy and its foreign allies. It went on to conduct the 1952 Revolution, and in 1988 the MNR was back in power with Paz Estenssoro, its founder and leader, as president. Although the 1952 Revolution fundamentally transformed Bolivian society, a new political order was never fully implemented. Between 1952 and 1956, factions of the MNR debated alternative and novel modes of political organization, including proposals to implement a worker's assembly. By 1956, however, the 1947 constitution had been ratified. Apart from a powerful labor movement, organized as the Bolivian Labor Federation (Central Obrera Boliviana—COB), the MNR failed to create new institutions capable of channeling and controlling the demands of the groups mobilized by the 1952 Revolution.

The 1961 constitution institutionalized the gains of the 1952 Revolution by adopting universal suffrage, the nationalization of the mines, and agrarian reform. Factional disputes within the MNR, rooted in demands for access to state employment, undermined the party's capacity to carry out further reforms. In fact, the 1961 constitution served mainly the interests of Paz Estenssoro's faction of the MNR by providing for his reelection in 1964.

== 1960s constitutions ==
The overthrow of the MNR by General René Barrientos Ortuño (president, 1964–65; copresident, May 1965-January 1966; and president, 1966–69) in 1964 initiated the contemporary era in Bolivian constitutional development. After calling elections in 1966 and invoking the 1947 constitution, Barrientos attempted to force through Congress a new corporatist charter. Because he sought democratic legitimacy, however, he was forced to give up his original project in favor of a constitution rooted firmly in the liberal democratic tradition that had inspired the authors of the 1880 charter.

Under the terms of the Constitution of 1967, Bolivia was a unitary republic that retains a democratic and representative democracy. Article 2 stipulated that sovereignty resides in the people, that it is inalienable, and that its exercise is delegated to the legislative, executive, and judicial powers. The functions of the public power—executive, legislative, and judicial—could not be united in a single branch of government. Although the Constitution of 1967 recognized Roman Catholicism as the official state religion, it also guaranteed to all faiths the right to worship publicly. In theory, the people governed through their representatives and through other authorities established by law. The Constitution of 1967 became known to most Bolivians only in the 1980s because, for all practical purposes, it was in effect only until 1969 when a coup by General Alfredo Ovando Candia (copresident, May 1965-January 1966, and president, January–August 1966 and 1969–70) overthrew the civilian regime. Between then and 1979, the Constitution of 1967 was given only lip service by the military rulers who governed Bolivia.

== Decentralization and 21st century constitutional reform ==
Bolivia's most recent Constitution was drafted by the Constituent Assembly, an elected body that met in Sucre and Oruro from 6 August 2006 to 9 December 2007. The constitution was further modified by an Editing Commission before being present to Congress on 14 December 2007; by the Cochabamba Dialogue between the President and opposition Prefects in September 2008; and in Congress during negotiations for a referendum in October 2008.

It came into effect on February 7, 2009, when it was promulgated by President Evo Morales after being approved in a referendum with 90.24% participation. The referendum was held on January 25, 2009, and the constitution was approved by 61.43% of voters.

The 2009 Constitution defines Bolivia as a unitary plurinational, and secular (rather than a Catholic, as before) state, formally known as the Plurinational State of Bolivia. It calls for a mixed economy of state, private, and communal ownership; restricts private land ownership to a maximum of 5,000 hectares (12,400 acres); recognizes a variety of autonomies at the local and departmental level. It elevates the electoral authorities, to become a fourth constitutional power; introduces the possibility of recall elections for all elected officials; and enlarges the Senate. Members of the enlarged National Congress will be elected by first past the post voting in the future, in a change from the previous mixed member proportional system. The judiciary is reformed, and judges will be elected in the future and no longer appointed by the National Congress. It declares natural resources to be the exclusive dominion of the Bolivian people, administered by the state. Sucre will be acknowledged as Bolivia's capital, but the institutions will remain where they are (executive and legislative in La Paz, judiciary in Sucre). The electoral authorities will be situated in Sucre.
