= Abelardo Villalpando =

Bolivian politician

Abelardo Villalpando Retamozo

Member of the Bolivian National Convention (1938); Senator; Deputy

Personal details
- Born: 1909 Puna, Potosí, Bolivia
- Died: 30 May 1997 (aged 87–88)
- Education: Tomás Frías University
- Occupation: Politician, lawyer, academic
- Known for: Co-founder of the Communist Party of Bolivia (PCB); Principal of Tomás Frías University

Abelardo Villalpando Retamozo was a Bolivian politician.

Villalpando Retamozo was born in Puna, Potosí in 1909. He obtained a law degree from the Tomás Frías University. He was one of the representatives of the Popular Front of Potosí in the Bolivian National Convention of 1938. He joined the Revolutionary Left Party (PIR) in 1940. He was a co-founder of the Communist Party of Bolivia (PCB). He was elected Deputy and Senator on a number of occasions. He was named Principal of the Tomás Frías University in 1955, and served in this role for three tenures.

Villalpando Retamozo died on 30 May 1997.
