= Carlos Quintanilla =

President of Bolivian from 1939 to 1940

General Carlos Quintanilla
- Portrait of Quintanilla, c. 1939–1940

37th President of Bolivia
- Provisional
- In office 23 August 1939 – 15 April 1940
- Vice President: Vacant (1939); None (1939–1940) (Note: Office abolished 4 December 1939.)
- Preceded by: Germán Busch
- Succeeded by: Enrique Peñaranda
Other offices
Ambassador of Bolivia to the Holy See
In office 1940–1941
President	Enrique Peñaranda
Pope	Pius XII
Preceded by	Gabriel Gosálvez
Succeeded by	Eduardo Arze Quiroga (as chargé d'affaires)
Commander-in-Chief of the Armed Forces
In office 11 January 1938 – 23 August 1939
President	Germán Busch
Preceded by	Enrique Peñaranda
Succeeded by	Bernardino Bilbao Rioja

Personal details
- Born: Carlos Quintanilla Quiroga; 22 January 1888 Cochabamba, Bolivia
- Died: 8 June 1964 (aged 76) Cochabamba, Bolivia
- Spouse: Lila Navajas Trigo
- Parents: Jenaro Quintanilla; Carlota Quiroga
- Relatives: Bernardo Navajas (brother-in-law)
- Education: Military College of the Army

Military service
- Allegiance: Bolivia
- Branch/service: Bolivian Army
- Rank: General
- Battles/wars: Chaco War

Carlos Quintanilla Quiroga (22 January 1888 – 8 June 1964) was a Bolivian military officer who served as the 37th president of Bolivia from 1939 to 1940.

Born in Cochabamba, he graduated from the Military Academy of the Army in 1911 and furthered his education and training in Germany, where he served on assignment on several occasions. Discharged in 1923, he rejoined the military in 1926, reaching the rank of brigadier general in 1931, shortly before the outbreak of the Chaco War the following year.

Known for his administrative qualifications, Quintanilla lacked strategic and tactical prowess compared to his opponents. He commanded troops at the Battle of Boquerón, the first major skirmish in the conflict with Paraguay. Following the fall of the outpost, he was relived of command by President Daniel Salamanca and spent the duration of the war in Tarija. He briefly returned to the front after the overthrow of Salamanca in 1934 and took part in the final phase of fighting.

Following the conflict's resolution, Quintanilla remained active in leadership and was part of the old guard of the officer class weary of the post-war reformist tendency dominant among young veterans. Named commander-in-chief of the Armed Forces during the administration of Germán Busch, he moved to purge radical officers from the military's ranks. In the immediate aftermath of Busch's death in office in 1939, Quintanilla seized power in a coup d'état and established a provisional government.

The Quintanilla regime suppressed opposition from radical officers, rescinded a landmark Busch decree regulating the foreign export earnings of mining corporations, and abolished the office of vice president. Under pressure to do so, the government organized snap general elections held in 1940, won by Enrique Peñaranda. After leaving office, he was named ambassador to the Holy See. Retired from public life, Quintanilla died in Cochabamba in 1965.

== Early life and military career ==
Carlos Quintanilla was born on 22 January 1888 in the city of Cochabamba. He was the son of Jenaro Quintanilla and Carlota Quiroga. In 1906, he left his home town to pursue a high school education.

In 1907, he moved to live in the capitol of La Paz to continue his professional studies, entering the Military College of the Army. He graduated with the rank of second lieutenant of the army in 1911 at age 23.

To further his military education, Quintanilla traveled to the then German Empire in 1912 to pursue specialization courses in the 81st Frankfurt Regiment in the German army. In Germany, he would become deputy chief of the General Staff. In 1914 due to the outbreak of World War I in Europe, he returned to Bolivia.

In Bolivia, Quintanilla became an instructor at the Military College of the Army. He was also briefly Aide-de-camp to then-President Ismael Montes. Between 1915 and 1916 he rose to the rank of lieutenant and was promoted to captain in 1920.

Quintanilla again traveled to Germany in 1922, by which time the war in Europe had ended. He continued his studies in the 5th Infantry Division in Grafenwöhr. While abroad in 1923, he was promoted to the rank of major but was discharged the same year in Bolivia by President Bautista Saavedra. He was reincorporated into the Bolivian army with the rank of Lieutenant Colonel in 1926 by President Hernando Siles Reyes who appointed him to be the Bolivian military deputy in Germany.

Following his return from Germany, he was assigned as commander of various infantry regiments between 1927 and 1928 rising to the rank of colonel in 1929. That same year he was appointed commander of the 4th Division of the Bolivian Army in the Chaco, in dispute with Paraguay. Already in 1929, Quintanilla sent a general report to his superiors, warning about the situation of the country and the army.

In 1930 President Carlos Blanco Galindo appointed Quintanilla to the post of Bolivia's military attaché in Germany. As an attaché, Quintanilla was in charge of different missions in various European countries until 1931. He returned for a final time to Bolivia in 1931 and went on to command the First Division of the Bolivian Army in addition to being Deputy Chief of the General Staff.

== Chaco War ==
In July 1932, President Daniel Salamanca summoned General Quintanilla to replace General Filiberto Osorio as Chief of Staff of the Bolivian Army following his resignation. However, Osorio and Quintanilla reached a prior agreement and proposed to Salamanca that Osorio would withdraw his resignation and Quintanilla would take command of the Bolivian forces in the southeast of Chaco. In this way on 25 July 1932, Carlos Quintanilla was appointed commander of the First Army Corps made up of the 4th and 7th Divisions with a seat at Fort Muñoz. By this point in 1932, tensions between Bolivia and Paraguay over the Chaco dispute had reached their peak. On 15 June, a Bolivian detachment captured a fort near Pitiantutá Lake. The following month, a Paraguayan detachment drove the Bolivian troops from the area. In retaliation, President Salamanca ordered General Quintanilla to seize the Paraguayan forts Corrales, Toledo, and Boquerón.

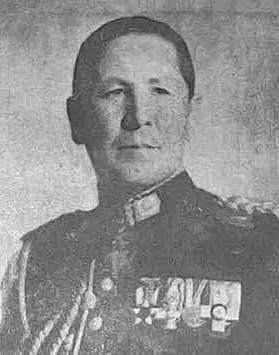
Quintanilla as a senior officer in the Bolivian armed forces

=== Battle of Boquerón ===
On 7 August, Bolivian forces occupied the Paraguayan Fort Carayá, as part of General Quintanilla's plan to advance towards Isla Poí, the Paraguayan army's base of operations. Before this could go into effect, on 9 September, Quintanilla suddenly found himself facing the first Paraguayan offensive led by lieutenant colonel José Félix Estigarribia, an officer of lower rank but superior professional training and experience. Days prior, Quintanilla had received reliable notice that the Paraguayans would attack with 6,000 men, which he rejected as impossible. Indeed, Quintanilla never would have a clear idea about the number and intentions of the enemy forces during the Battle of Boquerón. It quickly became evident that Salamanca had chosen him for his quantity as a "good administrator" not for his qualities as a tactician or strategist.

=== Dismissal ===
The fall of Boquerón led Salamanca to make changes in the high command of the armed forces. Osorio was replaced as Chief of the General Staff by José Leonardo Lanza while Quintanilla was replaced by Bernardino Bilbao Rioja. Initially, neither Osorio nor Quintanilla objected to this. At 1:10 p.m on 8 October, Quintanilla telegraphed Salamanca stating that "I am ready to leave [in the] early hours on the 11th". However, just a few hours later at 3:25 p.m. a second telegraphed letter gave an entirely different response. According to the six-point document, "The president in an unconsulted way for the current moment, has replaced General Osorio with General Lanza and adopting measures that contradict the plan of operations. Consequently, the Army ignores the authority of the President of the Republic and continues to recognize and will support General Osorio in his capacity as Chief of Staff in the Campaign".

The letter was signed by Quintanilla and Colonel David Toro, a fact which Foreign Minister David Alvéstegui Laredo took to mean that the original message had been the real thoughts of Quintanilla while the second had been the "result of a deliberation in which Toro imposed his ideas and undoubtedly it was he who wrote it". Whatever the case, a lack of support from other officers and the intervention of former president Ismael Montes forced Toro and Quintanilla to retract their attempted insubordination. In another message to Salamanca, Quintanilla wrote: "I must expressly state that official attitude does not inspire any subaltern or less subversive purpose".

Quintanilla left command on 11 October 1932. It would not be until January 1935, after the overthrow of Salamanca, that Quintanilla returned to the front, participating in the Battle of Villamontes now as the General Commander of the Central Sector, in the final phase of the Chaco War.

== Return to prominence ==
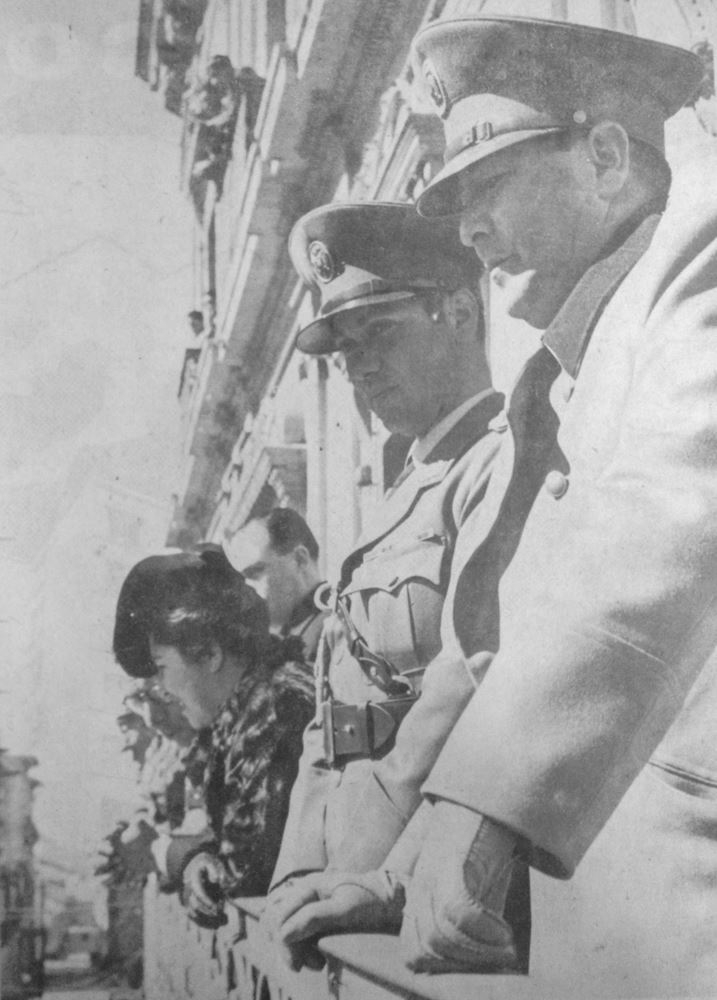
Quintanilla with Busch on the balcony of the Palacio Quemado

As a result of Bolivia's loss in the Chaco War, the old political order of Salamanca and his successor José Luis Tejada Sorzano were quickly painted by military officers like Quintanilla as responsible for the country's failure. However, Quintanilla, like many of his fellow conservative senior officers, was weary of the reckless reformist wave unleashed by the Military Socialist David Toro and Germán Busch regimes which followed.

Nevertheless, he was appointed commander-in-chief of the armed forces during the administration of Germán Busch. Busch, despite his experience of governing the army, was politically naive and allowed Quintanilla free rein to oust the younger liberal officers from their position of power. From the day of his appointment, there started a public purge of all "politically minded" officers from the ranks. This would eventually be ended by Busch under pressure from the left who feared the replacement of their allies with prewar officers.

=== 1939 coup d'état ===
In the early hours of 23 August 1939, a severely depressed Busch committed suicide, shooting himself in the right temple. At 6 a.m., General Quintanilla arrived at the Miraflores hospital where Busch was undergoing an agonizing operation. Seeing that the ailing president was unlikely to recover, the general then traveled with full speed back to the center of La Paz where he staged a military occupation of the Palacio Quemado, the government palace. The military justified their actions under the pretense that the death of Busch constituted an acephaly (absence of the head) of the Executive Power. However, such an argument would have also required the death of Vice President Enrique Baldivieso who was very much still alive. As such, the military also argued that Baldivieso had renounced his constitutional right to succession by engaging in the self-coup which dissolved the assembly and made Busch dictator months prior.

Months later on 4 December, by simple decree Quintanilla amended article 90 of the 1938 Constitution, outright abolishing the vice presidency claiming that the office was "not justified either by public needs or by the political tradition of the country".

== Interim president (1939–1940) ==
Busch finally died at 2:45 p.m. Soon after in a radio address to the nation, Quintanilla announced that "the life of the greatest Bolivian citizen, visionary and energetic statesman, the greatest and most enlightened defender of the rights of the State and the interests of the people, has just been tragically extinguished". In the same address, the general declared himself provisional president.

In the immediate aftermath of Busch's suicide, Quintanilla was faced with the task of stabilizing the country while also dispelling accusations that he was enacting a coup and that the president had been assassinated. In order to reinforce the version of Busch's suicide, the government of Quintanilla issued a statement on 24 August which "leaves on record with full evidence that the death of the president is due to an absolutely voluntary act by determination made under the weight of his deep patriotic anguish".

Despite swearing that his government would "continue the directives and orientations of the social and economic policy of Colonel Busch's," his main acts in his brief capacity as president were to begin the process of returning the country to the pre-war oligarchic status quo, complete with its faults and relative stability. On 19 October 1939, Quintanilla "temporarily" postponed the compulsory delivery of 100% of currency by mining industrialists to the State. Mining industrialists managed to recover the foreign currency from their exports, erasing the actions ordered by the Busch in June. His decision to issue fiduciary currency without legal support caused an inflation in the prices of basic necessities, worsening the country's dire economic situation.

For his actions in moving the country away from the era of military socialism, two senators suggested he be promoted to none other than the prestigious rank of Marshal of Bolivia, a title not held since Andrés de Santa Cruz and Otto Philipp Braun. The proposal failed and became the subject of mockery and popular epigrams deriding the idea with Quintanilla himself being awarded the derogatory nickname of "El Loco Mariscal" (The Crazy Marshal) as a result.

=== 1940 general election ===
Although Quintanilla sought to exercise a longer government, he could not resist the general pressure from both the conservative oligarchy and the young officers. Due to Quintanilla's prolonged indecision to call elections, General Enrique Peñaranda declared to the press that the country urgently needed "direct general elections to be called". Peñaranda was represented by the newly formed Concordance, a coalition of the traditional Genuine Republican, Liberal, and Socialist Republican parties backed by the mining oligarchy. These parties addressed the president in a note stating that "Deferring for a longer time, without valid reasons, the validity of the Political Constitution of the State and the call for direct elections, will lead public opinion to the conviction that their participation in the electoral plebiscite [...] will not be the authentic expression of the popular will". Given the pressure, the Quintanilla administration finally put out a call for elections on 6 October 1939, set to take place the following year on 10 March 1940.

Portrait of Quintanilla as president by Mario Miguez, Palacio Quemado

==== Military College revolt ====
General Bernardino Bilbao Rioja, who succeeded Quintanilla as commander-in-chief of the army, was promoted as a potential presidential candidate. Bilbao represented the line of Toro and Busch, was an admired hero of the Chaco War, and had the consensus among ex-combatants that Quintanilla lacked. Further, he had succeeded Busch as the Supreme Leader of the Legion of Veterans, legitimizing him among the junior officers.

In order to ensure the power of the senior officers, Quintanilla enacted measures to put down leftist opposition. On 25 October, Bilbao was summoned to the government palace to meet with the president. As soon as he arrived, he was surrounded by several men who mercilessly beat him until he was unconscious. Gagged and handcuffed, he was taken to a train station and deported on the spot to Arica. Following this, Quintanilla declared that "In the protection of social tranquillity, threatened in recent days and in my duty as a leader, I have accepted with feeling, but without hesitation the departure of General Bilbao Rioja". Later, Chief of the General Staff Antenor Ichazo took responsibility for the attack, arguing that Bilbao was preparing a coup.

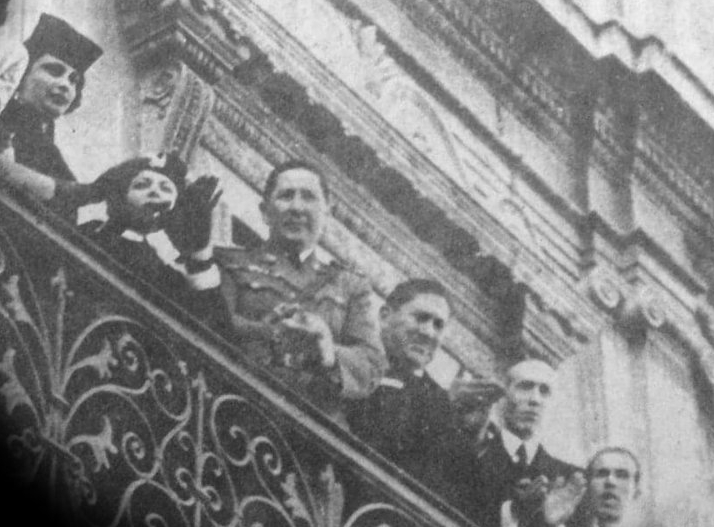
Quintanilla with future president Enrique Peñaranda in La Paz

The attack on Bilbao outraged the young officers of the military who threatened to rise up in open revolt against the government. Soon, eleven men of the Military College of the Army under the leadership of its director Lieutenant Colonel Sinforiano Bilbao (Bernardino Bilbao's brother), published a manifesto ignoring Quintanilla as provisional president, arming themselves in protest and threatening to bomb the Palacio Quemado. However, the revolt failed to attain popular support and the college was placed under siege by government forces.

At the same time, the Superior War School in Cochabamba made its own formal protest demonstration. A delegation of Cochabamba officers met with Quintanilla in La Paz in which both parties came to a mutual agreement. Quintanilla agreed to reinstate Bernardino Bilbao to his post as commander-in-chief of the armed forces within ten days, promised to maintain Sinforiano Bilbao as director of the Military College, and pledged not to sanction any retaliatory measures against any of the military elements that participated in the uprising. In return, Sinforiano agreed to lay down arms.

Despite the commitments made, Quintanilla soon went back on his promises. Instead of being allowed to return to his post, Bernardino Bilbao was given little choice but to accept an appointment as military attaché in London, travelling there directly from Chile in a disguised exile. Sinforiano Bilbao, meanwhile, was exonerated from his position and took refuge in the Chilean Embassy.

==== The camperada ====
General elections were held on 10 March 1940. Given the suppression of opposition leaders, Peñaranda won in an absolute majority with 58,060 votes against only 10,000 of his opponent, the Marxist José Antonio Arze. A minor setback in the transition occurred on 26 March when the perpetrators of the attack on Bilbao supposed that they could launch a coup of their own. The "Chapaco Putsch", named so due to the fact its leaders were all Chapacos from Tarija, was organized by Antonio Campero. In the early hours of 26 March, Antenor Ichazo and the police corps took up arms, taking over the entrances to the Plaza Murillo. However, when Quintanilla woke up at 5 AM he was surprised by troop movements in the plaza and ordered them to withdraw. Seeing the failure of the operation, Ichazo's nerves failed him and he turned coat and sided with the president.

An investigation later revealed that Ichazo was to be named president. Lieutenant colonel Luis Campero would assume leadership of the general staff, his brother Antonio Campero was to be secretary of the presidency, and lieutenant Gilberto Campero would become Minister of Government. The event was dubbed the camperada due to the shared last names of its leaders. The failed revolt was followed by an anti-coup demonstration in the plaza which was joined by supporters of the Concordance, employees of the Foreign Ministry, and left-wing figures such as Hernán Siles Zuazo and Rafael Otazo. Though Quintanilla made several speeches promising execution orders against the plotters, none were ever issued.

Peñaranda was inaugurated on 15 April 1940 bringing a close to Quintanilla's interim mandate.

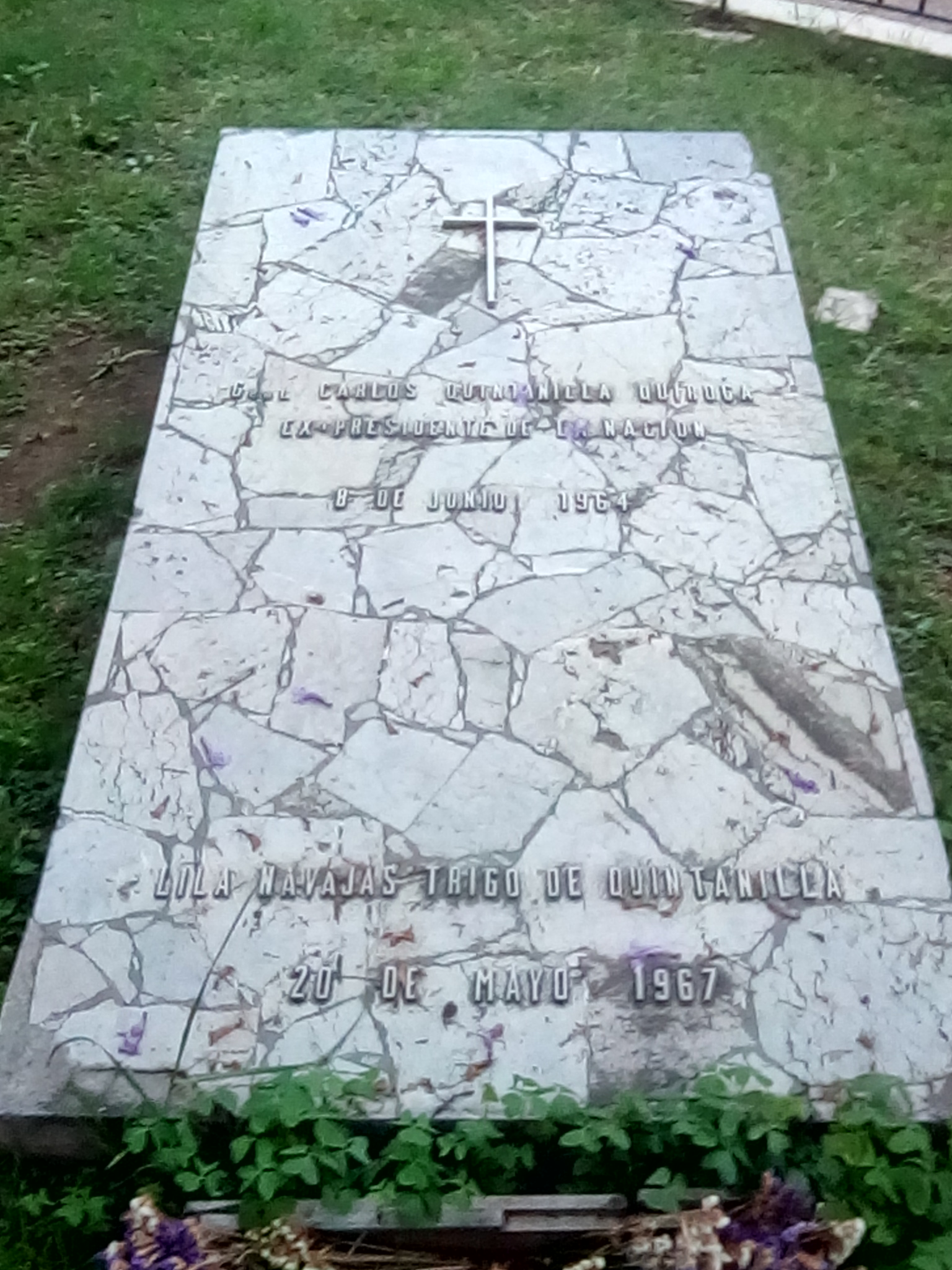
Grave of Carlos Quintanilla at the Cochabamba general cemetery

== Later years and death ==
Following the inauguration of Peñaranda, Quintanilla left the Palacio Quemado and moved to Rome, where he served as the Bolivian ambassador to the Holy See until 1941.

Quintanilla died in his native Cochabamba on 8 June 1964, at the age of 76.

== See also ==
- Cabinet of Carlos Quintanilla

== Bibliography ==
- Antezana Villagrán, Jorge (1981). La Guerra del Chaco: análisis y crítica sobre la conducción militar. (in Spanish)
- Brockmann, Robert (2007). El general y sus presidentes: vida y tiempos de Hans Kundt, Ernst Röhm y siete presidentes en la historia de Bolivia, 1911-1939 (in Spanish). Plural editores. ISBN 978-99954-1-115-2.
- Dunkerley, James (1987). Orígenes del poder militar: Bolivia 1879-1935. ISBN 99905-75-18-5. (in Spanish)
- Céspedes, Augusto (1968). El dictador suicida: 40 años de historia de Bolivia (in Spanish). Librería y Editorial Juventud.
- Gumucio, Mariano Baptista (1996). Breve historia contemporánea de Bolivia (in Spanish). Fondo de Cultura Económica. ISBN 978-968-16-4840-4.
- Klein, Herbert S. (May 1967). "Germán Busch and the Era of "Military Socialism" in Bolivia". The Hispanic American Historical Review. XLVII (2): 166–184. Archived from the original on 7 October 2021.
- Mesa, José de; Gisbert, Teresa; Gisbert, Carlos D. Mesa (2003). Historia de Bolivia (in Spanish). Editorial Gisbert y Cia. ISBN 978-99905-800-4-4.
- Tabera, Félix (1979). Apuntes para la historia de la Guerra del Chaco. Picuíba. (in Spanish)

Military offices
Preceded by Enrique Peñaranda	Commander-in-Chief of the Armed Forces; 1938–1939	Succeeded by Bernardino; Bilbao Rioja
Political offices
Preceded by Germán Busch	President of Bolivia; Provisional; 1939–1940	Succeeded by Enrique Peñaranda
Diplomatic posts
Preceded by Gabriel Gosálvez	Ambassador of Bolivia to the Holy See; 1940–1941	Succeeded by Eduardo Arze; Quiroga as chargé d'affaires
