= Legion of Veterans =

- Legión de Ex-Combatientes
- Abbreviation: LEC
- Formation: 13 September 1935
- Founder: Germán Busch
- Dissolved: c. 1939
- Type: Chaco War veterans' organization
- Headquarters: La Paz, Bolivia
- Supreme Leader: Germán Busch (1937–1939); Bernardino Bilbao Rioja (1939)
- Affiliations: Socialist Single Front

The Legion of Veterans (Spanish: Legión de Ex-Combatientes, LEC) was a Bolivian Chaco War veterans' organization. It was organized on 13 September 1935 by Lieutenant Colonel Germán Busch from various local veterans groups which had established themselves across the country following the end of the Chaco War. Despite its apolitical stance and fairly consistent commitment to non-party affiliation, the LEC, as a result of its sheer size and ideological commitment to the reformist ideals of the so-called generación del Chaco, soon came to act as the principal source of organized civil-military support for the military regimes of Colonel David Toro and later Lieutenant Colonel Germán Busch.

== History ==
=== Background ===
Soon after the end of the Chaco War in June 1935, local veterans' organizations began to be formed across the country, spanning the entire political and ideological spectrum. From the left-wing came organizations such as the National Association of Socialist Veterans (Asociación Nacional de Ex-Combatientes Socialistas, ANDES) and the far-left Association of Ex-Prisoners (Asociación de Ex-Prisioneros, AEP), formed by Bolivian prisoners of war in Paraguay. Another group founded by Bolivian POWs in 1934 was the Reason for the Fatherland (Razón de Patria, RADEPA) military lodge which advocated internal reform within the army. However, groups like RADEPA would remain largely hidden until the 1940s.

The meteoric rise to prominence of these veterans' organizations ultimately resulted in the formation of the Legion of Veterans as a national organization on 13 September 1935. While similar to other groups in its veterans' mutualist aims, the LEC was notably different to other veterans' groups due to its official apolitical slogan and fairly consistent commitment to non-party affiliation. However, apoliticalism in this sense was interpreted less as "anti-party" and more to mean that the LEC would support any political party willing to pay off the veterans. It even held certain ideological stances, claiming itself to be "a great trade union institution with a socialist ideology".

The LEC quickly rose to become the most important of the veterans' organizations, being granted official government recognition soon after its formation. By early 1936, its moderate reformist positions had made it an ally of the labor movements and the United Socialist Party (PSU). In May 1936, these three groups participated in the overthrow of the ruling conservative elite and the establishment of a new Government Junta regime under the leadership of Colonel David Toro.

=== Military socialist era ===
The LEC granted its support to Toro's military socialist agenda for a little over a year from 22 May 1936 to July 1937. By that point, opposition to Toro had slowly increased amongst the young officers who believed that his pragmatic approach was not achieving meaningful political reforms they had hoped for. In La Paz on 10 July 1937, the LEC elected Army Chief of the General Staff Germán Busch as the Supreme Leader (Jefe Supremo) of the organization. The move was a deliberate rejection of Toro as the leader of the veterans' movements. Three days later, Toro had been forced to resign and Busch assumed the presidency of the junta.

When Busch called for the establishment of a National Convention, the LEC was a component of the Socialist Single Front in the 1938 legislative election.

=== Dissolution ===
The power of the LEC would not last for much long after. On 23 August 1939, Germán Busch committed suicide while still holding the presidency of the state. Soon after Busch's death, on 4 September, Commander-in-Chief of the Armed Forces Bernardino Bilbao Rioja was elected as the new Supreme Leader of the LEC. Bilbao Rioja was a popular leader of the young officers and the natural successor to Busch. However, his campaign for president in the 1940 general election proved too big a threat to traditional conservative interests, leading the interim government of Carlos Quintanilla to have him forcefully deported to Chile before being exiled as a military attaché in London. Bilbao Rioja won just 2.69% of the vote in that election and the LEC faded out of relevance soon after.

== Bibliography ==
- Álvarez España, Waldo (1986). Memorias del primer ministro obrero: historia del movimiento sindical y político boliviano, 1916-1952 (in Spanish). Imprenta y librería Renovación.
- Gallego, Ferran (26 November 2015). "La posguerra del Chaco en Bolivia. Excombatientes, «socialismo militar» y nacionalización de masas". Revista Universitaria de Historia Militar. 4 (7). ISSN 2254-6111.
- Malloy, James (15 October 1970). Bolivia: The Uncompleted Revolution. University of Pittsburgh Pre. ISBN 978-0-8229-7585-4.
