= 1931 Bolivian constitutional referendum =

A constitutional referendum was held in Bolivia on 11 January 1931. Voters were asked whether they approved of nine separate proposed amendments to the constitution, all of which were approved.

== Background ==
On 24 June 1930 General Carlos Blanco Galindo led a military coup to oust President Hernando Siles Reyes. The military junta subsequently proposed several constitutional changes and fresh elections. A decree was issued on 27 November 1930 ordering a referendum on 28 December. However, it was later postponed. Elections were held on 4 January.

== Electoral system ==
Blank votes were added to the "yes" votes. Voting was restricted to certain level of income or assets, whilst women and illiterate men were barred from voting.

== Proposals ==
The proposals included:

1. Protection of citizens against arrests, detentions and illegal procedures.
2. Guarantees for loans contracts, bringing foreign companies under public control, protections for manual workers and defending social order against criminals, agitators and foreigners.
3. Limitation of the powers of the state of siege and defence of individual rights.
4. Expanding the powers of Congress, but limiting the power of the Senate on public honours.
5. Preventing immediate re-election for Presidents and Vice-Presidents
6. Incorporation of the Comptroller General as a constitutional body.
7. Administrative decentralisation.
8. University autonomy.
9. Judicial autonomy.

== Results ==
Proposal	For		Against		Invalid/ blank	Total	Registered voters	Turnout
Proposal	Votes	%	Votes	%	Invalid/ blank	Total	Registered voters	Turnout
1		88.0		12.0			90,000	
2		88.0		12.0			90,000	
3		88.0		12.0			90,000	
4		88.0		12.0			90,000	
5		88.0		12.0			90,000	
6		88.0		12.0			90,000	
7	22,458	78.2	6,251	21.8			90,000	
8		88.0		12.0			90,000	
9		88.0		12.0			90,000	
Source: Direct Democracy

== Aftermath ==
The National Congress were opposed to the referendum as it had not been carried out in accordance with the constitution, but ratified the approved proposals. The changes went into effect on 23 February, although the changes on election of the President and autonomy of universities were dropped.
