= Bolivian Constitution of 1826 =

Bolivian constitution from 1826 to 1831

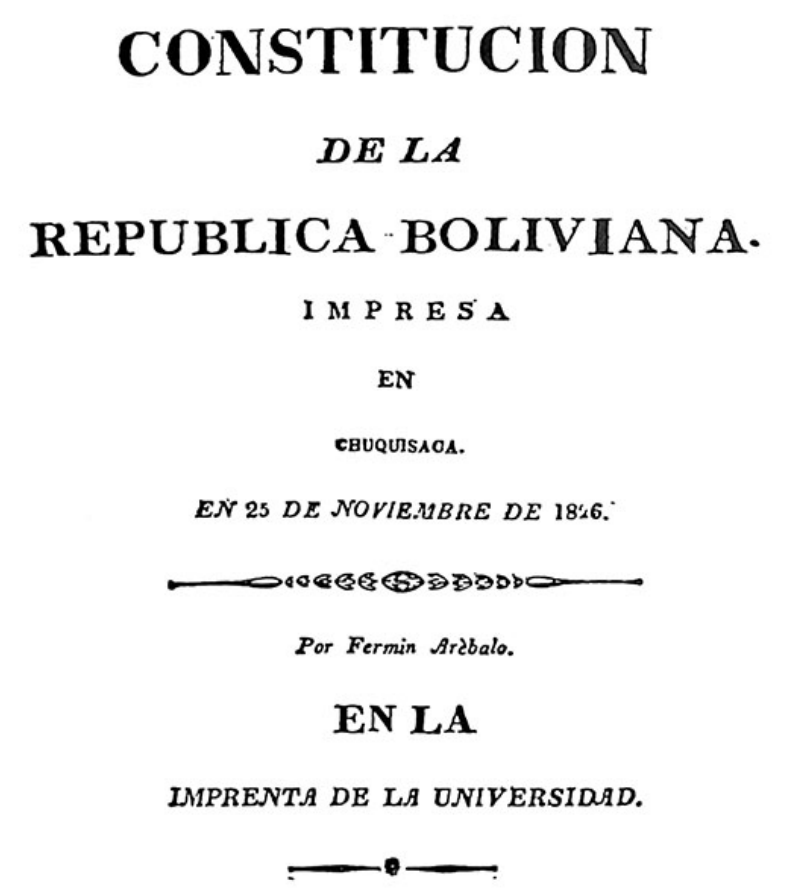
- The front cover of an 1826 copy made by the Constituent Assembly
- Created: 12 May 1826
- Ratified: 6 November 1826
- Date effective: 19 November 1826

Government structure
- Branches: 4
- Chambers: 3
- Executive: Yes
- Judiciary: Yes
- Federalism: No
- Repealed: 1831
- Author: Simón Bolívar

Full text
- Constitution of the Bolivian Republic of 1826 at Wikisource

The Bolivian Constitution of 1826 (Spanish: Constitución de Bolivia de 1826) or the Bolivarian Constitution (Spanish: Constitución Bolivariana) was the constitution of Bolivia from 1826 to 1831. Featuring many autocratic elements, most notably a lifelong unelected leader with the power to choose a successor, It was drafted by Simón Bolívar as a way of preventing democratic rule so that order could be maintained in Bolivia. It was divisive throughout the Americas. It was promulgated on 19 November 1826 by Antonio José de Sucre, who served as the lifelong executive of the constitution until his 1830 resignation. The constitution was succeeded in 1831.

== Background ==
After the Bolivian War of Independence concluded with the independence of Bolivia, Simón Bolívar was made president of the country, then called the Republic of Bolívar. Simón Bolívar was, however, cautious to treat the country as a real entity. In his rule, he made many proclamations (signed as Dictator of Peru) to liberalize the country and referred to the country as Upper Peru. This was because of his doubt that Bolivia was able to govern itself. He was troubled by the country's illiteracy and political immaturity. He was also afraid of instituting democracy in Bolivia, lest the non-white majority overthrow or kill the ruling white minority, as had happened in Haiti. Bolívar had been asked during his rule to write a constitution for the country by its legislative Constituent Assembly. He promised that he would give to the country a constitution, and he received another same request from the Constituent Assembly, now under his lieutenant Sucre, in May 1826.

An attempt to institute a constitution based on the United States constitution featuring principles from the French system, representative democracy for the country had already failed in 1815.

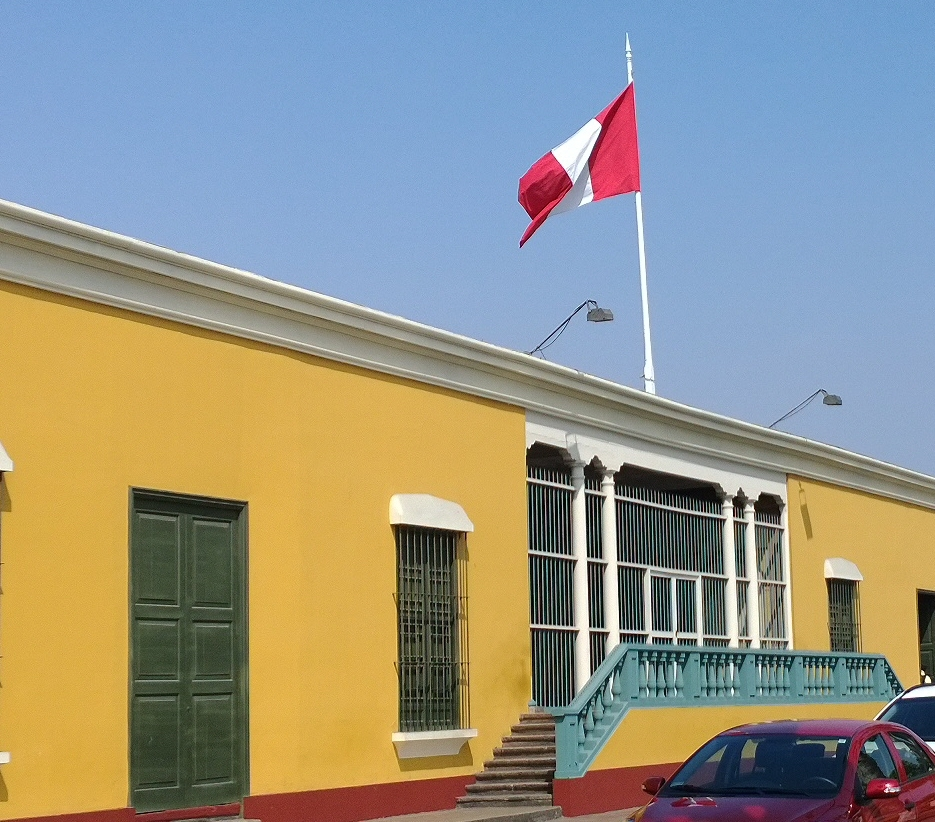
Palacio de la Magdalena, Bolívar's residence in Lima

== Propagation and reception of the draft ==
The constitution was written in 1826 while Bolívar was in Lima. He sent Lieutenant Colonel William (or Guillermo) Ferguson 1,800 miles (2,900 km) in 21 days to Chuquisaca for it to be reviewed. The document was also widely distributed by Bolívar, who, proud of his clear expression of his ideas, called it "his favorite daughter" (Spanish: su hija predilecta). Among those who he sent it to, he won the approval of Abbe de Pradt and Juan José Flores. In England, where it was widely circulated to try to improve investor confidence in access to the country's silver resources, it was seen as an enlightened document which provided generous liberties, although with principal similarities to their system, while in the United States it was seen as outrageous for its lifelong presidency, and in its South it was outrageous for its abolitionism. In Chile and Argentina the constitution received some praise, while in the Bolivarian countries, Francisco de Paula Santander was at first privately critical, then publicly so. The constitution was fodder for Bolívar's enemies in Lima.

The autocracy exhibited by the constitution did damage to the Bolivarian cult of personality holding Gran Colombia together. 1827, Colonel José María Bustamante initiated a rebellion of the Third Division of the Colombian Army and took Guayaquil, holding the city from April until October that same year.

== Content ==
The system of government created by the Constitution of 1826 had four branches of government, the judiciary, the executive, the tricameral legislature, and an electoral body. The legislature's bodies were the elected Senate, which had 8 year terms, and the Chamber of Tribunes, with 4 year terms. The third body of the legislature was the Chamber of Censors, whose members ruled for life. The designated role of each body was such: the Senate would codify laws and keep in line the church and court officials, the Chamber of Tribunes had general legislative powers, and the Chamber of Censors had oversight powers including the power to impeach and choose legislative members, as well as enforcing morality. The executive was the President, who was first appointed by the legislature before serving for life and appointed his successor, who would serve as Vice President.

Theoretically, the constitution forewent elections. Its system of finding leaders involved a branch of government formed by ten citizens in every province appointing an elector. These electors formed another body which chose members of the legislature. Legislative members also had a say in their successors. This branch could also bring into powers justices and mayors. All officials appointed were to be men over the age of 21.

Bolívar's draft deliberately made no mention of any specific religion, so as to minimize its relevance in the affairs of government. As president in 1825 he had made decrees aimed at decreasing the role of the church in Bolivia. The draft also explicitly ended slavery. Both of these topics were changed in the adopted constitution.

As part of the anti-democratic aims of the constitution, there was a limited franchise extended to men with property exceeding 400 Bolivianos and for those working in the arts, sciences, and other such careers. This restricted franchise endured in Bolivia until the Bolivian National Revolution in 1952.

Bolívar called his formulation of government "the most sublime inspiration of republican ideas" because of its clear expression of his ideas about government. His ideas about the executive were suggested for the Colombian Constitution of 1821, but rejected. He was of the view that South America was best ruled by strong personalities and of rule by the elite. Bolívar cited Alexandre Pétion as his influence for a strong executive. At the Angostura Address, he expressed a desire for government to have a moral basis in rule. However, there is discontinuity in Bolívar's view of elections. He treated them as leading to anarchy in republics in the constitution, but praised them in the Angostura Address, apparently reversing on the issue after seven years of campaigning in South America. Despite the autocratic nature of the document, historian John Lynch said of it that it was a liberal one nonetheless, guaranteeing liberty, equality, security, property and providing an independent judiciary.

== Adoption ==
The Constitutional Affairs Committee in Chuquisaca assembled on 12 June to consider the constitution. They produced a report on 11 July with some suggested revisions. It moved next to the general Bolivian Constituent Congress, where it was discussed from July to November. 19 changes were suggested, 9 were incorporated and 2 influenced a revision of the wording. It was approved on 6 November and promulgated by Sucre on 19 November, who served as the first president under the constitution. Among the changes were ones done to the treatment of slavery and religion. The adopted constitution explicitly mentions the Catholic Church as the sole religion of the country, and the abolitionist draft by Bolívar changed to legally abolish slavery, but require slaves to stay with their masters until the passage of a "special law".

Sucre himself had not wanted to serve as president, wanting instead to return to Quito and marry Mariana Carcelén, but Bolívar had kept him in Bolivia.

== Repeal ==
Sucre resigned in 1830, appointing a council in his place. Andrés de Santa Cruz replaced the constitution with a less autocratic one in 1831. According to the United States Federal Research Division, some historians have observed that the Constitution of 1826 would have worked for the country better than later liberal constitutions.

== Bibliography ==
- Hudson, Rex A.; Hanratty, Dennis M., eds. (1991). Bolivia: a country study. Federal Research Division (3rd ed.). Library of Congress.
- Masur, Gerhard (1948). Estudios Bolivarianos.
