= Alcides Arguedas =

Bolivian writer and historian

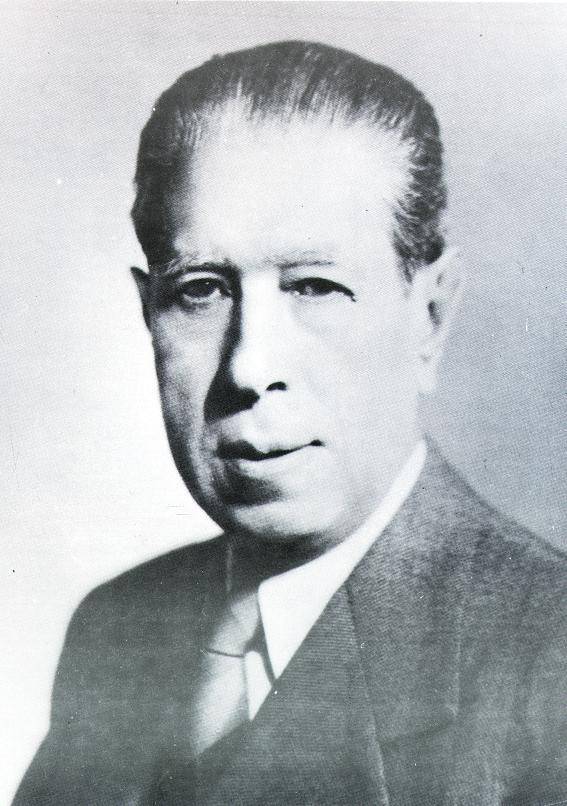

Senator for La Paz
- In office 1940–1942

Minister of Agriculture, Immigration, and Colonization
- In office 15 April 1940 – 11 November 1940
- President: Enrique Peñaranda
- Preceded by: Carlos Salinas Aramayo
- Succeeded by: Edmundo Vásquez as Minister of Agriculture; Demetrio Ramos as Minister of Immigration; Carlos Blanco Galindo as Minister of Colonization

Member of the Chamber of Deputies for La Paz
- In office 1916–1918

Personal details
- Born: Alcides Arguedas Díaz; 15 July 1879 La Paz, Bolivia
- Died: 6 May 1946 (aged 66) Chulumani, Bolivia
- Party: Liberal
- Spouse: Laura Tapia Carro
- Children: 3
- Parent(s): Fructuoso Arguedas; Sabina Díaz
- Education: Higher University of San Andrés

Alcides Arguedas Díaz (July 15, 1879 in La Paz – May 6, 1946 in Chulumani) was a Bolivian writer and historian. His literary work, which had a profound influence on the Bolivian social thought in the first half of the twentieth century, addresses issues related to national identity, miscegenation, and indigenous affairs. His most significant work, Raza de bronce ("Bronze Race") (1919), is considered one of the most influential Bolivian literary works and a precursor of indigenism.

== Background and political and diplomatic roles ==
Son of Fructuoso Arguedas and Sabina Diaz, Arguedas studied in the Ayacucho school and then Law and Political Science (1904) at the Universidad Mayor de San Andrés and sociology in La Paz.

He began working in various forms of media as a student, beginning with the Peruvian newspaper El Comercio, moving on to columns for El Diario, the short-lived Revista de América and El Mundial, and eventually becoming deputy editor of El Debate in 1915.

As a diplomat, he was second secretary of the Legation of Bolivia in Paris (1910), where he would meet Rubén Darío and Francisco Garcia Calderon and would have as boss the ex-president Ismael Montes. Subsequently, he was sent to London.

After returning to Bolivia, he was elected deputy of the Bolivia's Liberal Party in 1916, and served as Bolivian representative to the creation of the League of Nations (1918). He also was consul general in Paris (1922) and minister plenipotentiary in Colombia (1929), where he was dismissed for criticizing the President Hernando Siles (1930).

He maintained a critical stance toward certain political administrations, for which he was removed from office, exiled, and even slapped by then-President Germán Busch. He became senator for the department of La Paz and eventually led the Liberal Party.

Under the administration of President Enrique Peñaranda, he served as Minister of Agriculture, Colonization, and Immigration (1940), and then left for Venezuela as minister plenipotentiary (1941).

== Writer ==
Arguedas is one of Bolivia's best-known writers. His work describes the relationship between Bolivian society and its indigenous peoples, often cynically. Through his books, full of social analysis, he sought a solution for his country's permanent state of conflict. Some of the issues for which he contributed a significant amount of thought—conflicts between cultures, the complexities of mestizaje, and the sometimes violent relationship between the indigenous and creole/mestizo worlds—were later taken up by other currents of thought, including indigenismo, albeit from a different perspective.

His first literary works date from his student days, and the first book he published was Pisagua, a novel which appeared in 1903. In the subsequent year, he wrote Wata-Wara. His novelistic production would continue with Vida criolla (1912) and culminate with Raza de bronce.

His essay Pueblo enfermo ("sick people" or "sick town"), published in Barcelona in 1909, solidified his importance in Latin American letters, earning praise from major writers such as Miguel de Unamuno and Amado Nervo. However, it created controversy in Bolivia, and Franz Tamayo responded critically to his ideas in a series of editorials that would later be compiled as his book Pedagogía de la educación nacional. Arguedas coined the term "radical pessimism" for his stance on indigenous issues, explaining that it came from "a mixture of fatal biological laws, historical reasons and environmental circumstances [that] have made the indigenous an atrophied or infirm race". Unsurprisingly, some critics identify Arguedas with some of the more distasteful aspects of the Bolivia of his time and reject his relationship with indigenismo

However, in his most important novel, Raza de bronce ("Bronze Race"), Arguedas lays out several themes that would later be instrumental in the development of Bolivian literature: the creole-mestizo oppression against indigenous peoples, their capacity to rise in the face of these abuses, the social placement of the "cholo-mestizo" (a term, now more commonly a slur, for those mestizos whose indigenous parentage exceeds their European), and the rift between creole and indigenous societies in Bolivia.

Arguedas worked on this novel almost until his death. Although he published his first edition in 1919, he continued correcting and re-editing it until he released the definitive edition in 1945. The plot of Raza de bronce is an evolution of his second novel, Wata-Wara, which went relatively unnoticed at the time of publication. In retrospect, despite widespread criticism, it was listed by experts as one of the essential works of Bolivian literature.

Over the years, Arguedas found history to be a more direct medium for reflecting upon and interpreting Bolivian social reality. His first historical book, La fundación de la República, was published in 1920. This marked a turning point in Arguedas's life: from here, history and politics came to the fore and his work in literature became secondary.

The first volume of his Historia general de Bolivia was published two years later under the auspices of industrialist and millionaire Simon I. Patino. He completed only five of the eight projected volumes of that collection, ranging from the colonial period to its violent 19th-century era of caudillismo.

Arguedas received the Rome Prize in France for his autobiographical book La danza de las sombras in 1935.

== Personal life ==
Arguedas was married to Laura Tapia Carro from 1910 until her death in 1935. The couple had three daughters.

In 1945, after spending a period of time in Buenos Aires, he returned to Bolivia and died of leukemia in Chulumani, a district of La Paz, on May 6, 1946, at the age of 66.

== Important works ==
- Pueblo enfermo 1909 (social commentary)
- Raza de bronce (1919) (novel)
- La fundación de la República (1920) (history)
- Historia general de Bolivia (1922) (history)
- Política y la Guerra del Chaco (1926) (history)
- La dictadura y la anarquía (1926) (history)
- Los caudillos bárbaros (1929) (history)
- La danza de las sombras (1934) (memoirs)
