= Socialist Single Front =

Socialist Single Front Frente Único Socialista
- Founded: February 18, 1938
- Headquarters: La Paz
- Ideology: Socialism
- Political position: Left-wing

Socialist Single Front (Spanish: Frente Único Socialista, FUS) was a Bolivian electoral political alliance of left-wing and socialist political parties and organizations.

The Socialist Single Front was established on 18 February 1938, for the 1938 congressional elections, by these parties:

- Legion of Veterans
- Confederation of Bolivian Workers
- Workers' Party
- Popular Front of Potosi
- United Socialist Party
- Republican Socialist Party
- Independent Socialist Party.

The Socialist Single Front was associated with the revolutionary government of Colonel Germán Busch Becerra and elected majority deputies of the new Constituent Assembly.
