= Workers' Party (Bolivia) =

The Workers' Party (Spanish: Partido Obrero, PO) was a Bolivian left-wing-socialist political party.

The Workers' Party was founded on November 23, 1937 by the leaders of the trade union Confederation of Bolivian Workers. The leaders of the Workers' Party were Waldo Álvarez España, Eduardo Arze Loureiro, Julio Ordóñez, Federico González, Luciano Durán Böger, Luis Peñaloza and Román Vera Álvarez.

The Workers' Party was associated with the revolutionary government of Colonel Germán Busch Becerra (1937–1939). For the 1938 congressional elections, the Workers' Party was the component of the pro-military Socialist Single Front.

The Workers' Party did not survive long after the suicide of Colonel Germán Busch.
