= Independent Socialist Party (Bolivia) =

Bolivian political party

The Independent Socialist Party (Spanish: Partido Socialista Independiente, PSI) was founded in March 1938 by Víctor Paz Estenssoro, Carlos Salamanca, Jorge Aráoz Campero, Carlos Montenegro and Augusto Céspedes, following a split in the United Socialist Party.

Independent Socialist Party was created by a radical sector and was “the advocate economic nationalism and are in favor of controlling foreign capital, and its re-investment in Bolivia”.

The Independent Socialist Party was associated with the revolutionary government of Colonel Germán Busch Becerra, between 1937 and 1939. For the 1938 elections, the Independent Socialist Party was the component of the pro-military Socialist Single Front.

During the 1938 Constituent Assembly, the Independent Socialists were an influential element of the leftist political grouping. Many of the PSI's founders were student activists, war veterans, and journalists of the middle class.

The Independent Socialists elected some deputies of National Congress in 1940, and during Enrique Peñaranda del Castillo's administration they were among the government's opponents in parliament.

In 1941 the Socialistas Independientes decided to form a more massively based political party, the Revolutionary Nationalist Movement.
