= Popular Front of Potosí =

The Popular Front of Potosí (Spanish: Frente Popular de Potosí, FPP) was a powerful local left-wing-socialist political party in Potosí.

Popular Front of Potosí was founded in 1936 by the labor leaders of Potosí, after Germán Busch Becerra's revolution.

It was associated with the revolutionary governments of Colonels José David Toro Ruilova and Germán Busch Becerra, between 1936 and 1939. For the 1938 congressional elections, the Popular Front of Potosí was the component of the pro-military Socialist Single Front and elected some deputies (Carlos Medinaceli, Renato Riverín, Abelardo Villalpando, Alfredo Arratia). During the 1938 Constituent Assembly, the Popular Front of Potosí was an influential element of the leftist political grouping.

The Popular Front of Potosí elected some deputies of the National Congress in 1940 (Alfredo Arratia, Abelardo Villalpando, Fernando Siñani and Raúl Ruiz González), and during Enrique Peñaranda del Castillo's administration they were among the government's opponents in parliament.

In 1940, the Popular Front of Potosí merged with the Revolutionary Left Party.
