= Genuine Republican Party =

Genuine Republican Party Partido Republicano Genuino
- Leader: Daniel Salamanca Urey
- Founded: 1921
- Dissolved: 1946
- Split from: Republican Party
- Merged into: Republican Socialist Unity Party
- Ideology: Conservatism; Liberal conservatism Protectionism; Agrarianism
- Political position: Right-wing
- National affiliation: Concordance

The Genuine Republican Party (Spanish: Partido Republicano Genuino, PRG) was founded in Bolivia in 1921 by José María Escalier and Daniel Domingo Salamanca Urey following a split in the Republican Party.

The Genuine Republican Party was formed by a conservative sector. The Republican Government of Bautista Saavedra enacted progressive social and labor codes and doubled government taxes on mining. Frightened, the urban upper class and traditional rural and regional elites rallied around Daniel Salamanca, a Cochabamba Department landowner and old-style patrician. The program of this party advocated recovery of Bolivian territory and freedom of speech.

In May and December 1925 Daniel Salamanca unsuccessfully ran in the presidential elections. Shaken by his defeats, he retired from politics and dedicated himself to teaching law. After the military overthrow of Hernando Siles Reyes in 1930, he was asked to head a coalition of Genuine Republicans and Liberals. He was elected president and took office on 5 March 1931. The Salamanca government introduced an impopular austerity program and harshly clamped down on political opposition. The eventual escalation of the war exacerbated severe economic problems in Bolivia (dating from the Great Depression of 1929), while causing many thousands of casualties. On 27 November 1934, the Bolivian military deposed Daniel Salamanca.

In 1940 the party formed The Concordance with Liberals to counter the rising tide of radical and revolutionary parties; the Concordance supported the candidate Enrique Peñaranda.

On 10 November 1946, the Genuine Republican Party merged with the Republican Socialist Party, the United Socialist Party and Independent Socialist Party to form the new Republican Socialist Unity Party.
