= Carlos Blanco Galindo =

President of Bolivia from 1930 to 1931

General Carlos Blanco Galindo
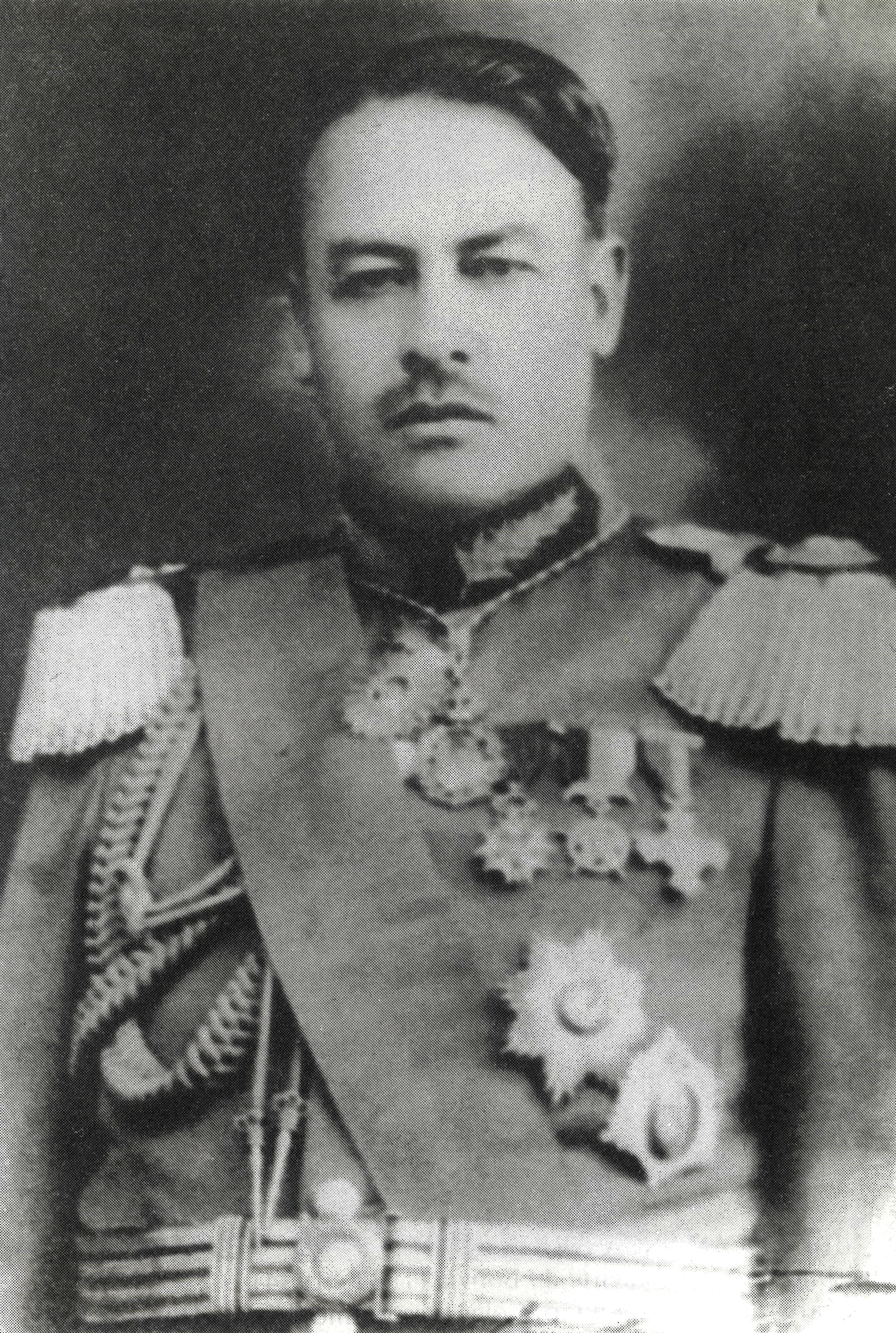
- Official portrait, c. 1930–1931

32nd President of Bolivia
- In office 28 June 1930 – 5 March 1931
- Vice President: Vacant
- Preceded by: Hernando Siles
- Succeeded by: Daniel Salamanca

Minister of War and Colonization
- In office 11 November 1940 – 12 June 1941
- President: Enrique Peñaranda
- Preceded by: Demetrio Ramos
- Succeeded by: José Miguel Candia

Personal details
- Born: Carlos Blanco Galindo; 12 March 1882 Cochabamba, Bolivia
- Died: 2 October 1943 (aged 61) Cochabamba, Bolivia
- Spouse: Alicia O'Connor D'Arlach
- Parents: Cleómedes Blanco; Edelmira Galindo
- Relatives: Pedro Blanco (great-grandfather)

Military service
- Allegiance: Bolivia
- Branch/service: Bolivian Army
- Rank: General
- Battles/wars: Chaco War

Carlos Blanco Galindo (12 March 1882 – 2 October 1943) was a Bolivian military officer who served as the 32nd president of Bolivia from 1930 to 1931.

== Biography ==
Carlos Blanco was born in Cochabamba, Bolivia. A career military officer and a lawyer, Blanco was one of the leaders of the insurrection that toppled from power Hernando Siles, who had attempted to extend his term in office in view of the grave challenges posed by the onset of the Great Depression and other looming political crises. Unable to impose his will, Siles resigned and left his cabinet collectively in charge; it was this "Silista" cabinet that was, in fact, overthrown by the coup led by Blanco (in alliance with the parties opposed to Siles) in late June 1930.

Blanco's term was short and rather simple; his main task was to call new elections, which took place within seven months of his swearing-in. In every other matter, he seemed to defer to his rather capable technocratic Cabinet, led by Daniel Sánchez Bustamante (1871–1933) – the grandfather, incidentally, of future president Gonzalo Sánchez de Lozada. Upon the election, and assumption of office, of Daniel Salamanca, Blanco was named ambassador to Uruguay, but returned briefly to the active service upon the eruption of the Chaco War with Paraguay (1932–35). He would later write a number of books.

Blanco died in Cochabamba in October 1943.

== Publications ==
- Blanco Galindo, Carlos (1918). Documentos para la historia de Bolivia: Cartas del General Antonio José de Sucre, Gran Mariscal de Ayacucho (in Spanish). La Paz: Litografía e Imprenta Moderna. OCLC 4618549.
- —————————— (1920). Compendio de la historia de las campañas de Napoleón (in Spanish). La Paz.
- —————————— (1922). Resumen de la historia militar de Bolivia: Guerras de la independencia e internacionales (in Spanish). La Paz: Intendencia de Guerra. OCLC 2489592.
- ——————————; et al. (1928). Historia de Bolivia: Crónica del año 1828 (in Spanish). Cochabamba: Editorial López. OCLC 1123261645.
- ——————————; et al. (1936). Expediciones al Chaco (in Spanish). Cochabamba: Editorial Canelas. OCLC 253753611.

Government offices
Office established	President of the Government Junta; 1930–1931	Office dissolved
Political offices
Preceded by Hernando Siles	President of Bolivia; 1930–1931	Succeeded by Daniel Salamanca
Preceded by Demetrio Ramos	Minister of War and Colonization; 1940–1941	Succeeded by José Miguel Candia
Diplomatic posts
Preceded by Alberto Cortadella as Chargé d'affaires	Ambassador of Bolivia to the Holy See; 1931–1932	Succeeded by David Alvéstegui
