= United Socialist Party (Bolivia) =

Bolivian political party

United Socialist Party Partido Socialista Unificado
- Leader: Enrique Baldivieso
- Founded: March 15, 1936
- Dissolved: November 10, 1946
- Split from: Nationalist Party
- Merged into: Republican Socialist Unity Party
- Headquarters: La Paz
- Ideology: Socialism; Corporatism
- Political position: Left-wing

The United Socialist Party (Spanish: Partido Socialista Unificado, PSU), named Socialist Party (Spanish: Partido Socialista, PSU) before 1940, was founded on 15 March 1936, as the result of a split in the Nationalist Party in 1936 and the adhesion of some prominent members of the Republican Socialist Party in 1937, and backed by Legion of Veterans and by the regional socialist groups.

The leaders of the party were Enrique Baldivieso, José Tamayo Solares, Fernando Campero Álvarez, Gabriel Gosálvez, Javier Paz Campero, Vicente Mendoza López, Hugo Ernst Rivera, Alberto Saracho, Carlos Salinas Aramayo, Francisco Lazcano Soruco, Armando Arce, and Augusto Céspedes.

“It espoused a somewhat confused corporativist philosophy, urging extensive government intervention in the economy, compulsory unionization of all workers, and the establishment of a legislature on the basis of functional, rather than geographical, representation”.

The Socialist Party was associated with the revolutionary governments of Colonels José David Toro Ruilova and Germán Busch Becerra, between 1936 and 1939. For the 1938 elections, the Socialist Party was the component of the pro-military Socialist Single Front.

As the Socialist Party disappeared after the suicide of Germán Busch, a group of its former members under the leadership of José Tamayo Solares united with Alfredo Mollinedo and found the United Socialist Party in June 1940. The United Socialist Party elected some deputies of National Congress in 1940, and during the first 2 years of Enrique Peñarand's administration they were among the government's opponents in parliament. However, in his third year in office, Enrique Peñaranda formed a so-called cabinet of concentration which the United Socialist Party joined. It was in office when the Peñaranda government was overthrown on 20 December 1943.

With the coup d'état of 1943 and the coming to power of Major Gualberto Villarroel, the United Socialist Party split, with a dissident group forming the Independent Socialist Party, which for some time cooperated with the Villarroel regime.

With the overthrow of Gualberto Villarroel on 10 November 1946, both of these groups joined with the Genuine Republican Party and the Republican Socialist Party to create the Republican Socialist Unity Party.
