= Cabinet of David Toro =

Bolivian presidential administration and ministerial cabinet from 1936 to 1937

Toro cabinet
- 97th Cabinet of the Republic of Bolivia
- 1936–1937
- Date established: 17 May 1936
- Date dissolved: 13 July 1937

Leadership and composition
- President: David Toro
- Vice President: Vacant
- No. of ministers: 10 (on 13 July 1937)
- Total no. of members: 15 (incl. former members)
- Member parties: United Socialist Party; Socialist Republican Party

Formation and history
- Predecessor: Cabinet of José Luis Tejada Sorzano
- Successor: Cabinet of Germán Busch

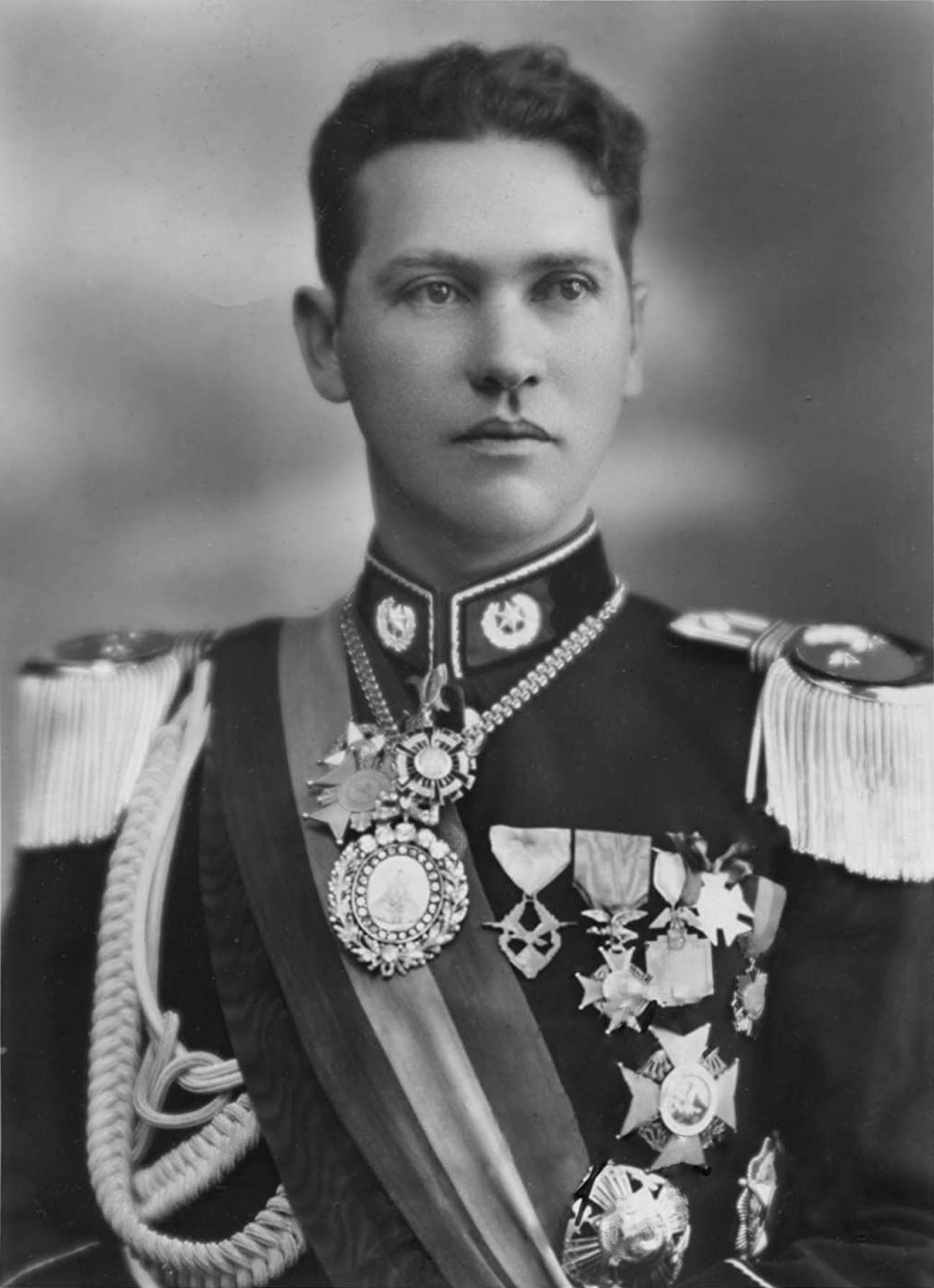
Germán Busch was Provisional President of the Junta until 22 May

The Cabinet of David Toro constituted the 97th national cabinet of the Republic of Bolivia. It was a component of the Government Junta led by President David Toro and was in office from 17 May 1936 to 13 July 1937.

The cabinet was formed after the armed forces ousted President José Luis Tejada Sorzano in a coup d'état which brought a civil-military junta to power. For the first five days of its existence, the cabinet and the junta were chaired by Lieutenant Colonel Germán Busch until the arrival of Toro on 22 May. It was dissolved when Toro was deposed in another coup d'état led by Busch, though the junta Toro chaired remained in power.

== Cabinet Ministers ==
Cabinet of Bolivia Presidency of David Toro, 1936–1937
Office		Minister	Party	Prof.	Term	Days	N.C	P.C
President		Germán Busch (Note: Provisional President of the Junta: 17–22 May 1936.)	Mil-Soc.	Mil.	17 May 1936 – 22 May 1936	5	–	–
President		David Toro	Mil-Soc.	Mil.	22 May 1936 – 13 July 1937	417	–	–
Vice President		Office vacant throughout presidency					–	–
Minister of Foreign Affairs and Worship (Chancellor)	–	Enrique Baldivieso	PSU	Law.	17 May 1936 – 11 November 1936	178	97	1
Minister of Foreign Affairs and Worship (Chancellor)	Minister of Propaganda	Enrique Finot	PL	Law.	11 November 1936 – 13 July 1937	244	97	1
Minister of Government and Justice		Julio Viera	Mil-Soc.	Mil.	17 May 1936 – 13 July 1937	422	97	1
Minister of National Defense		Gabriel Gosálvez	PSU	Eco.	17 May 1936 – 7 September 1936	113	97	1
Minister of National Defense		Oscar Moscoso (Note: Acting Foreign Minister: 20 June – 4 September 1936.)	Mil-Soc.	Mil.	7 September 1936 – 13 July 1937	309	97	1
Minister of Development and Communications		Pedro Zilveti	PRS	Law.	17 May 1936 – 13 July 1937	422	97	1
Minister of Finance and Statistics		Fernando Álvarez Campero	–	Law.	17 May 1936 – 13 July 1937	422	97	1
Minister of Industry and Commerce		Jorge Jórdan	Mil-Soc.	Mil.	17 May 1936 – 6 August 1936	81	97	1
Minister of Industry and Commerce		Arturo Guillén	Mil-Soc.	Mil.	6 August 1936 – 13 July 1937	341	97	1
Minister of Mining and Petrol		Antenor Ichazo	Mil-Soc.	Mil.	22 May 1936 – 13 July 1937	417	97	1
Minister of Work and Social Security		Waldo Álvarez	CSTB	Uni.	22 May 1936 – 17 January 1937	240	97	1
Minister of Work and Social Security		Javier Paz Campero	PSU	Law.	17 January 1937 – 13 July 1937	177	97	1
Minister of Education and Indigenous Affairs		Raul Tovar	Mil-Soc.	Mil.	17 May 1936 – 12 October 1936	148	97	1
Minister of Education and Indigenous Affairs		Alfredo Peñaranda	Mil-Soc.	Mil.	12 October 1936 – 23 November 1937	407	97	1 (Note: Remained as a member of the 1st Cabinet of Germán Busch.)
Minister of Agriculture, Colonization, and Immigration		Luis Añez Rodríguez (Note: Acting Foreign Minister: 7 September – 19 December 1936.)	Mil-Soc.	Mil.	17 January 1937 – 13 July 1937	177	97	1

== Composition ==
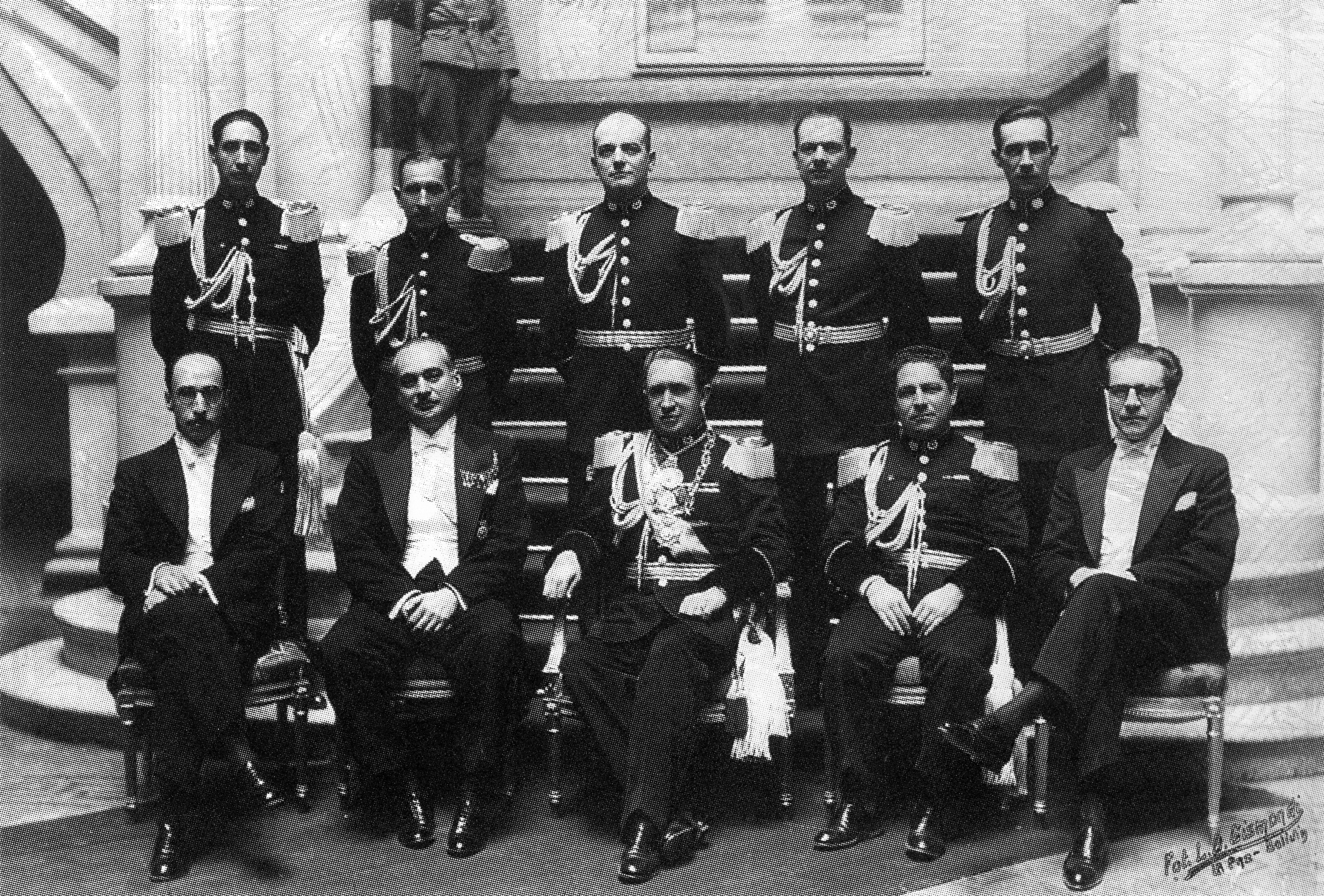
President Toro with the government junta which served as his ministerial cabinet

The majority of Toro's cabinet consisted of military personnel, particularly members of the young officer corps. Of these, were the four lieutenant colonels Julio Viera (Government and Justice), Jorge Jórdan (Industry and Commerce), Antenor Ichazo (Mining and Petrol), and Luis Añez Rodríguez (Agriculture, Colonization, and Immigration). Other members of the military included Major Raul Tovar (Education and Indigenous Affairs), and Colonel Oscar Moscoso (National Defense). This is not to mention lieutenant colonel Germán Busch, who served as provisional president of the junta until 22 May, as well as David Toro himself, who has a colonel.

Leftist political and social movements were represented by Enrique Baldivieso, one of the founders and leader of the United Socialist Party (PSU). Organized labor was represented by Waldo Álvarez, a key figure in the debilitating general strikes which set the stage for the stage for the coup. Álvarez had been elected as a delegate to the junta by an assembly of the Workers Federation of Labor (FOT) and the Local Workers' Federation (FOL).

The composition of the cabinet was also significantly restructured, elevating the number of ministries to ten. Four of these were the offices of Statistics, Immigration, Commerce, and Indigenous Affairs. In addition, the Office of Propaganda was established as a component of the Foreign Ministry in late 1936. Furthermore, the Ministry of Mining and Petrol was formed on 22 May, foreshadowing a more active involvement by the Bolivian government in the exploitation of its natural resources which would eventually lead to the nationalization of Standard Oil in March 1937. Finally, the Ministry of Work and Social Security was established on 22 May under the leadership of unionist Waldo Álvarez. However, Álvarez would resign in early 1937 following the issuance of an "anti-communist" decree by Toro which led to the arrest of numerous senior officials. A second assembly of the FOT and FOL would elect Javier Paz Campero of the PSU to replace Álvarez.

On 13 July 1937, dissatisfied with what he viewed as unending political compromise and pragmatism, Germán Busch forced the resignation of David Toro. Busch was transmitted control of the junta, becoming de facto president. Many of the ministers in Toro's cabinet would remain in Busch's.

== Structural changes ==
Office	Part of	Date formed
Office of Indigenous Affairs	Ministry of Education	17 May 1936
Office of Statistics	Ministry of Finance	17 May 1936
Office of Immigration	Ministry of Agriculture	17 May 1936
Office of Commerce	Ministry of Industry	17 May 1936
Office of Propaganda	Ministry of Foreign Affairs	11 November 1936
Ministry		Date formed
Ministry of Work and Social Security		22 May 1936
Ministry of Mining and Petrol		22 May 1936

== Gallery ==
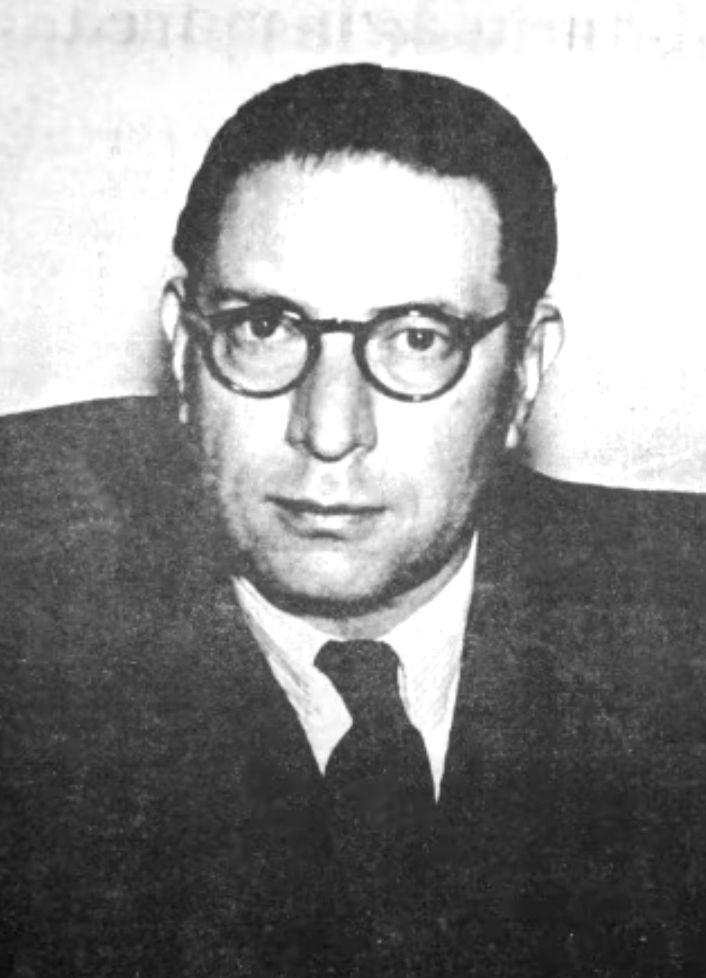
Enrique Baldivieso – Minister of Foreign Affairs

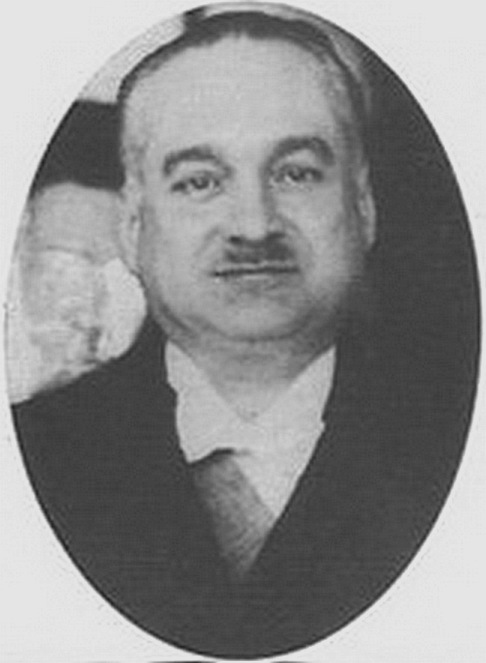
Enrique Finot – Minister of Foreign Affairs

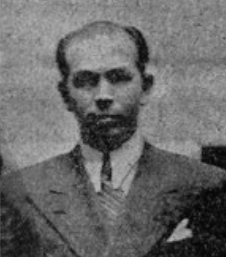
Julio Viera – Minister of Government

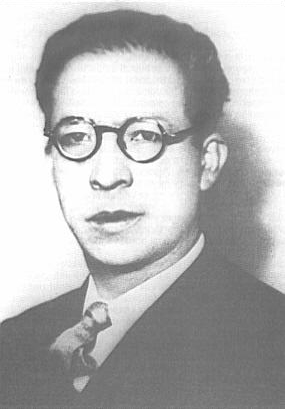
Gabriel Gosálvez – Minister of National Defense

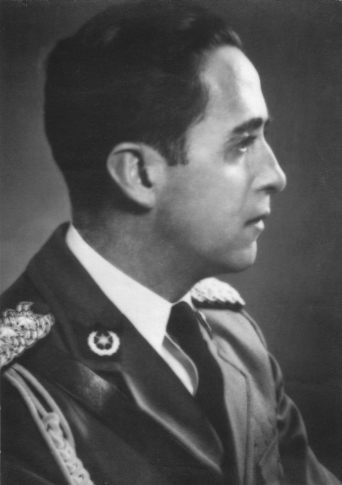
Oscar Moscoso – Minister of National Defense

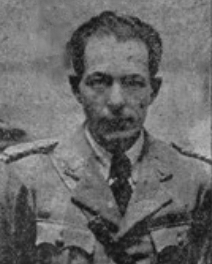
Jorge Jórdan – Minister of Industry

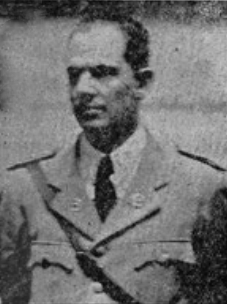
Antenor Ichazo – Minister of Mining

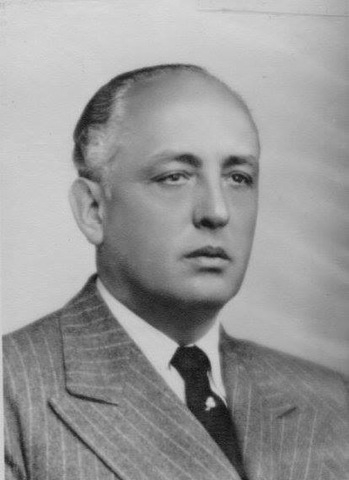
Pedro Zilveti – Minister of Development

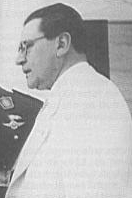
Javier Paz Campero – Minister of Work

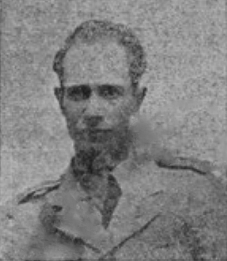
Raul Tovar – Minister of Education

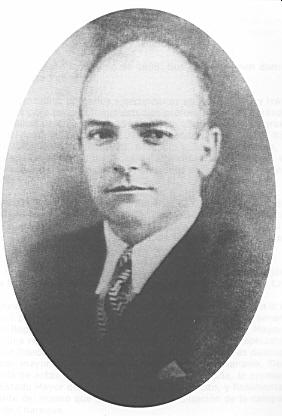
Luis Añez Rodríguez – Minister of Agriculture

== Bibliography ==
- Gisbert, Carlos D. Mesa (2003). Presidentes de Bolivia: entre urnas y fusiles : el poder ejecutivo, los ministros de estado (in Spanish). Editorial Gisbert.
- Klein, Herbert S. (May 1967). "Germán Busch and the Era of "Military Socialism" in Bolivia". The Hispanic American Historical Review. XLVII (2): 166–184.
