= Cabinet of Germán Busch =

Bolivian presidential administration and ministerial cabinet from 1937 to 1939

Busch cabinet
- 98th–100th Cabinet of the Republic of Bolivia
- 1937–1939
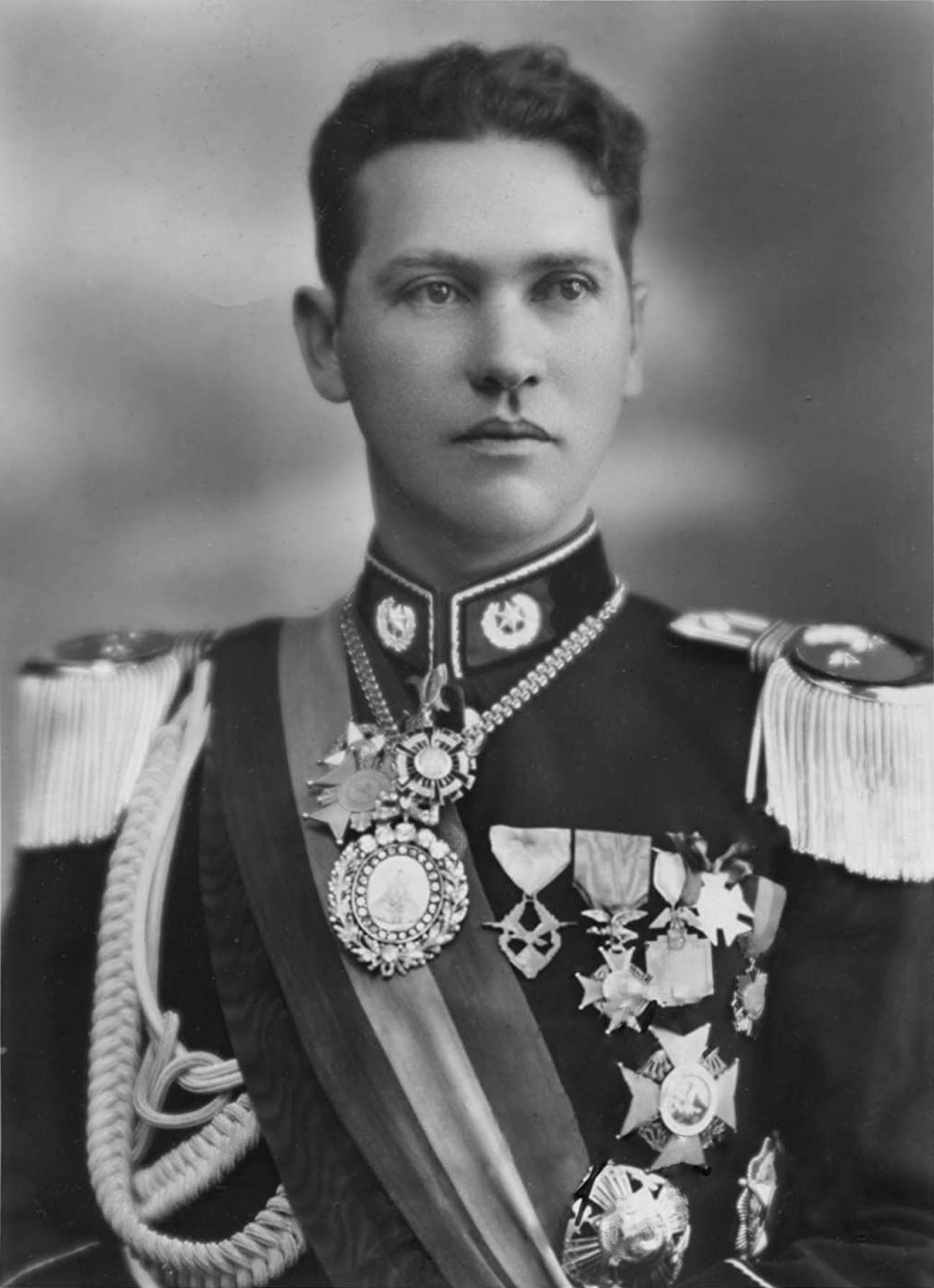
- Date formed: 13 July 1937
- Date dissolved: 23 August 1939

People and organisations
- President: Germán Busch
- Vice President: Vacant (1937–1938); Enrique Baldivieso (1938–1939); Vacant
- No. of ministers: 11 (on 23 August 1939)
- Total no. of members: 25 (including former members)
- Member parties: United Socialist Party (PSU); Socialist Republican Party (PRS)
- Status in legislature: Majority government

History
- Legislature term: 1938–1939
- Predecessor: Cabinet of David Toro
- Successor: Cabinet of Carlos Quintanilla (interim)

Germán Busch assumed office as the 36th President of Bolivia on 13 July 1937, and his term was cut short by his death on 23 August 1939. A young military officer during the Chaco War, Busch attempted to champion the cause of Military Socialism brought forth by his predecessor David Toro but, unhappy with the results produced by his few reforms, opted to declare himself dictator in April 1939 before committing suicide four months later.

Busch formed three cabinets during his 25-month presidency, constituting the 98th to 100th national cabinets of Bolivia as part of the 1936–1938 Government Junta.

== Cabinet Ministers ==
Cabinet of Bolivia Presidency of Germán Busch, 1937–1939
Office		Minister	Party	Prof.	Term	Days	N.C (Note: Denoting which national cabinet the minister was originally a part of.)	P.C (Note: Denoting which presidential cabinet the minister was originally a part of.)
President		Germán Busch	Mil-Soc.	Mil.	13 July 1937 – 23 August 1939	771	–	–
Vice President		Office vacant 13 July 1937 – 28 May 1938					–	–
Vice President		Enrique Baldivieso	PSU	Law.	28 May 1938 – 24 April 1939	331	–	–
Vice President		Office vacant 24 April 1939 – 23 August 1939					–	–
Secretary-General of the Junta		Gabriel Gosálvez	PSU	Eco.	13 July 1937 – 12 August 1938	395	98	1
Secretary-General of the Junta		Office discontinued from 12 August 1938						
Minister of Foreign Affairs and Worship (Chancellor)	Minister of Propaganda	Enrique Baldivieso	PSU	Law.	13 July 1937 – 14 December 1937	154	98	1
Minister of Foreign Affairs and Worship (Chancellor)	Minister of Propaganda	Eduardo Díez de Medina	–	Law.	14 December 1937 – 23 August 1939	617	99	2
Minister of Foreign Affairs and Worship (Chancellor)	–	Eduardo Díez de Medina	–	Law.	14 December 1937 – 23 August 1939	617	100	3
Minister of Government and Justice	–	Félix Tabera	Mil-Soc.	Mil.	13 July 1937 – 19 July 1937	6	98	1
Minister of Government and Justice	–	César B. Menacho	Mil-Soc.	Mil.	19 July 1937 – 12 August 1938	389	98	1
Minister of Government and Justice	–	César B. Menacho	Mil-Soc.	Mil.	19 July 1937 – 12 August 1938	389	99	2
Minister of Government and Justice	Minister of Propaganda	Gabriel Gosálvez (Note: Acting Foreign Minister in the absence of Enrique Baldivieso from 13 July to 25 July 1937 and in the absence of Eduardo Díez de Medina from 30 November to 30 December 1938.)	PSU	Eco.	12 August 1938 – 18 March 1939	218	100	3
Minister of Government and Justice	Minister of Propaganda	Vicente Leyton	–	Law.	18 March 1939 – 15 April 1940	394	100	3 (Note: Held over into the Quintanilla cabinet.)
Minister of National Defense		Secundino Olmos	Mil-Soc.	Mil.	13 July 1937 – 12 August 1938	395	98	1
Minister of National Defense		Secundino Olmos	Mil-Soc.	Mil.	13 July 1937 – 12 August 1938	395	99	2
Minister of National Defense		Felipe Manuel Rivera	Mil-Soc.	Mil.	12 August 1938 – 23 August 1939	376	100	3
Minister of Finance and Statistics		Federico Gutiérrez Granier	PL	–	13 July 1937 – 23 November 1937	133	98	1
Minister of Finance and Statistics		Eduardo Belmont Baldivia	–	Law.	23 November 1937 – 12 August 1938	262	99	2
Minister of Finance and Statistics		Vicente Mendoza López	Ind.	Eco.	12 August 1938 – 31 March 1939	231	100	3
Minister of Finance and Statistics		Santiago Schulze Arana	–	Eco.	31 March 1939 – 23 August 1939	145	100	3
Minister of Industry and Commerce		Angel Ayoroa	Mil-Soc.	Mil.	13 July 1937 – 23 November 1937	133	98	1
Minister of Industry and Commerce		Alfredo Peñaranda	Mil-Soc.	Mil.	23 November 1937 – 12 August 1938	262	99	2
Minister of Industry and Commerce		Vicente Leyton	–	Law.	12 August 1938 – 18 March 1939	218	100	3
Minister of Industry and Commerce		Luis Herrero	–	–	18 March 1939 – 23 August 1939	158	100	3
Minister of Development	Minister of Communications	Luis Campero	Mil-Soc.	Mil.	13 July 1937 – 12 August 1938	395	98	1
Minister of Development	Minister of Communications	Luis Campero	Mil-Soc.	Mil.	13 July 1937 – 12 August 1938	395	99	2
Minister of Public Works	Minister of Communications	Walter Méndez	Mil-Soc.	Mil.	12 August 1938 – 23 August 1939	376	100	3
Minister of Mining and Petrol		Felipe Manuel Rivera	Mil-Soc.	Mil.	13 July 1937 – 12 August 1938	395	98	1
Minister of Mining and Petrol		Felipe Manuel Rivera	Mil-Soc.	Mil.	13 July 1937 – 12 August 1938	395	99	2
Minister of Mining and Petrol		Dionisio Foianini (Note: Acting Foreign Minister in the absence of Eduardo Díez de Medina from 22 May to 19 July 1939.)	–	Bus.	12 August 1938 – 23 August 1939	376	100	3
Minister of Work and Social Security	–	Daniel Sossa	Mil-Soc.	Mil.	13 July 1937 – 12 August 1938	395	98	1
Minister of Work and Social Security	–	Daniel Sossa	Mil-Soc.	Mil.	13 July 1937 – 12 August 1938	395	99	2
Minister of Work and Social Security	Minister of Sanitation	Alberto Zelada	Mil-Soc.	Mil.	12 August 1938 – 20 March 1939	220	100	3
Minister of Work and Social Security	Minister of Sanitation	Roberto Jordán Cuéllar	PSU	–	20 March 1939 – 23 August 1939	156	100	3
Minister of Health and Hygiene		Office blank 13 July 1937 – 22 August 1938						
Minister of Health and Hygiene		Alfredo Mollinedo	PSU	Dr.	22 August 1938 – 15 April 1940	602	100	3
Minister of Education and Indigenous Affairs		Alfredo Peñaranda	Mil-Soc.	Mil.	12 October 1936 – 23 November 1937	133	97 (Note: Originally a member of the 97th national cabinet of Bolivia.)	1 (Note: Originally a member of the Toro ministerial cabinet.)
Minister of Education and Indigenous Affairs		Héctor Ormachea Zalles	–	Law.	23 November 1937 – 12 August 1938	262	99	2
Minister of Education and Indigenous Affairs		Bernardo Navajas Trigo	PL	Law.	12 August 1938 – 15 April 1940	977	100	3
Minister of Agriculture, Colonization, and Immigration		César B. Menacho	Mil-Soc.	Mil.	13 July 1937 – 19 July 1937	6	98	1
Minister of Agriculture, Colonization, and Immigration		Walter Méndez	Mil-Soc.	Mil.	19 July 1937 – 12 August 1938	389	98	1
Minister of Agriculture, Colonization, and Immigration		Walter Méndez	Mil-Soc.	Mil.	19 July 1937 – 12 August 1938	389	99	2
Minister of Agriculture, Colonization, and Immigration		Julio Salmón (Note: Acting Foreign Minister in the absence of Eduardo Díez de Medina from 3 June to 20 June 1938.)	PL	Law.	12 August 1938 – 23 August 1939	376	100	3

== Composition ==
=== First cabinet ===
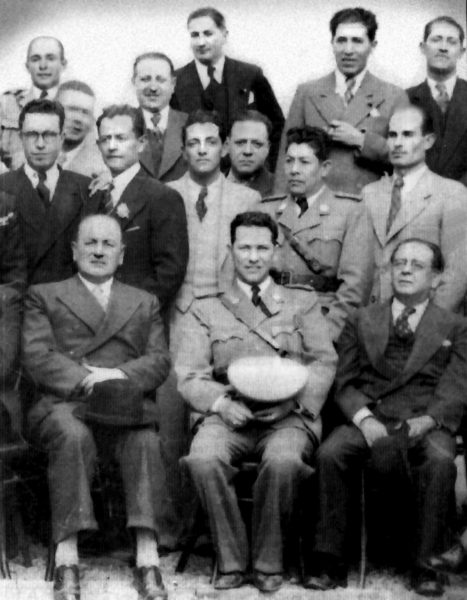
Germán Busch with various cabinet members and collaborators including Víctor Paz Estenssoro, Wálter Guevara, and Fernando Pou Mont

Having secured the resignation of President David Toro on 13 July 1937, Germán Busch entered the Palacio Quemado and established his first cabinet. The government was a mixture of leftist military officers and members of the United Socialist Party (PSU) which had collaborated with the Toro regime.

The Council of Ministers formed by Germán Busch indicated a continued struggle his regime faced in pinpointing a clear ideology. Politically, Busch appointed ministers generally in line with the moderate socialism of Toro, choosing the head of the PSU Enrique Baldivieso as foreign minister and the moderate socialist Gabriel Gosálvez as secretary-general. However, at the same time, he appointed such figures as the right-wing Federico Gutiérrez Granier in the crucial office of Minister of Finance, a position the Liberal politician would use to undo many of the consumer goods subsidies of the Toro regime. Minister of Agriculture Julio Salmón and Minister of Education Bernardo Navajas Trigo were also Liberals.

=== Second cabinet ===
The cabinet was renewed on 23 November 1937. Three ministerial positions were changed: Federico Gutiérrez Granier with Eduardo Belmont Baldivia as Minister of Finance, Angel Ayoroa with Alfredo Peñaranda as Minister of Industry, with Peñaranda's former position as Minister of Education being filled by Héctor Ormachea Zalles. The following month on 14 December, Foreign Minister Enrique Baldivieso was exchanged with Eduardo Díez de Medina who had served in the position once before.

During this period starting on 23 May, the National Convention of 1938 would be held and charged with rewriting the constitution. On 27 May, the National Convention would proclaim Busch constitutional president with Enrique Baldivieso as vice president.

=== Third cabinet ===
Busch's third cabinet was formed on 12 August 1938. Gabriel Gosálvez would be appointed Minister of Government and Justice as well as Propaganda which had previously been under the purview of the Foreign Ministry. No Secretary-General was appointed to replace him. Multiple health related ministries would be established as part of this cabinet. Upon the formation of the cabinet on 12 August, the new Minister of Labor Alberto Zelada would also be appointed to the position of Minister of Sanitation. Ten days later on 22 August, a dedicated Ministry of Health and Hygiene would be established with Alfredo Mollinedo appointed to head the position.

On 30 October, the National Convention would promulgate the new constitution. While the constitution would remain in effect until 1945, Busch would dismiss the national assembly on 24 April 1939 and declare himself dictator. Busch's presidency would come to an end four months later when he committed suicide. General Carlos Quintanilla would take hold of the presidency in the interim period and the majority of the Busch cabinet, save for Alfredo Mollinedo, Bernardo Navjas Trigo, Vicente Leyton, and Felipe Manuel Rivera, would be dismissed.

=== Established Ministries ===
- Office of Sanitation (under Work and Social Security): Alberto Zelada, first holder from 12 August 1938
- Ministry of Health and Hygiene: Alfredo Mollinedo (PSU), first holder from 22 August 1938

== Gallery ==
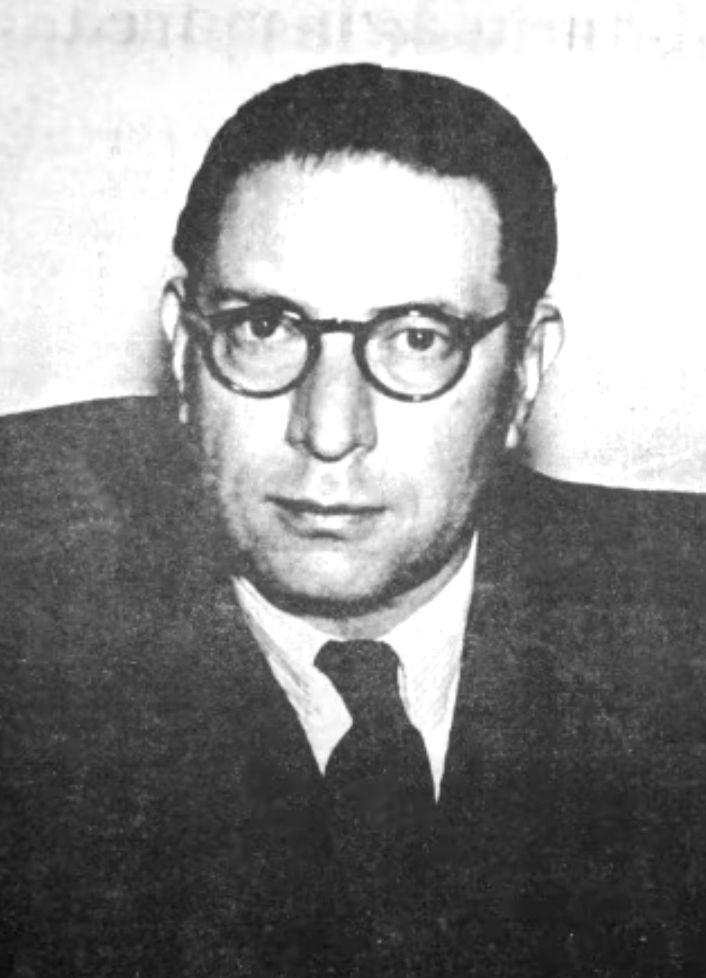
Enrique Baldivieso – Vice President and Minister of Foreign Affairs (PSU)

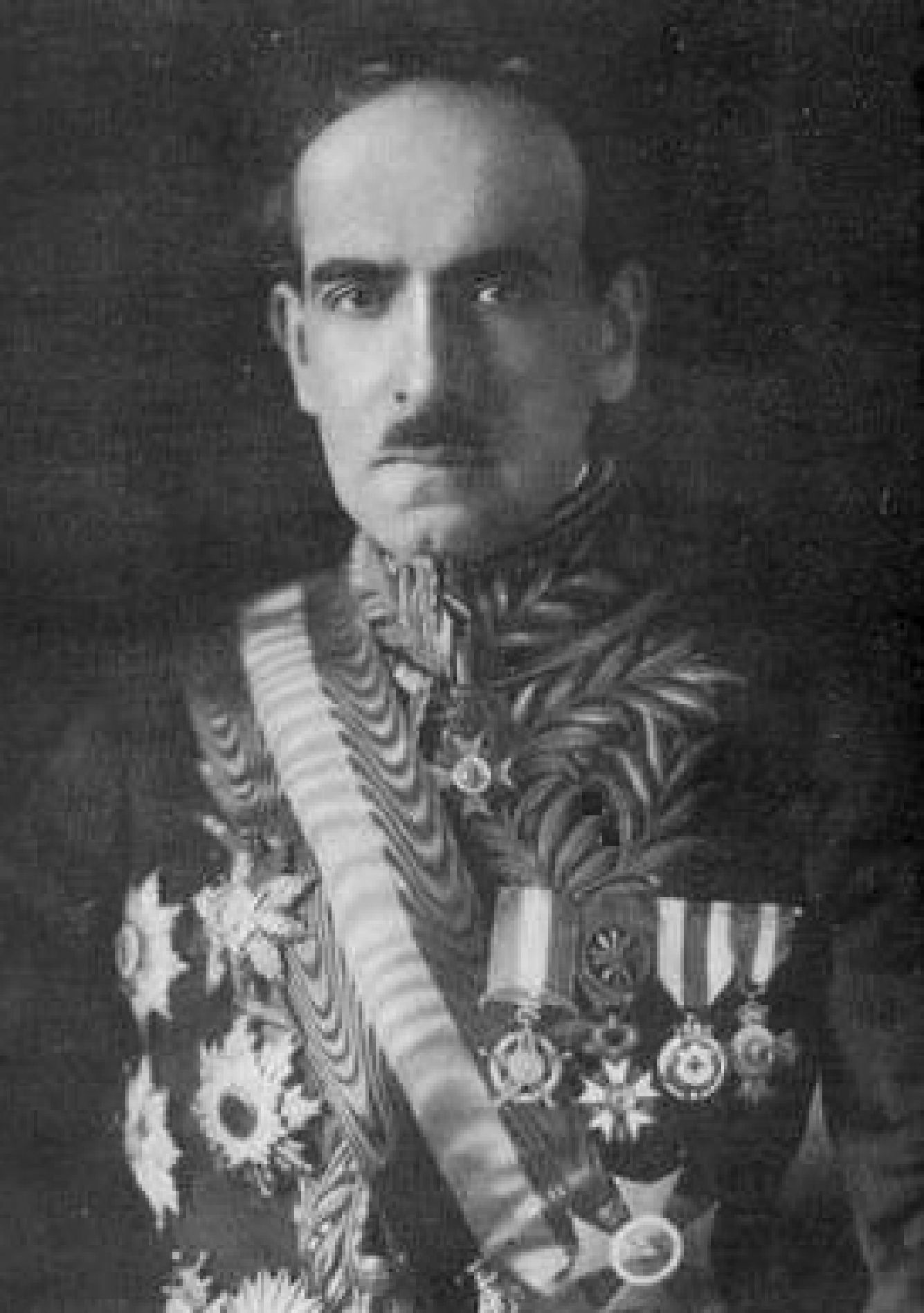
Eduardo Díez de Medina – Minister of Foreign Affairs

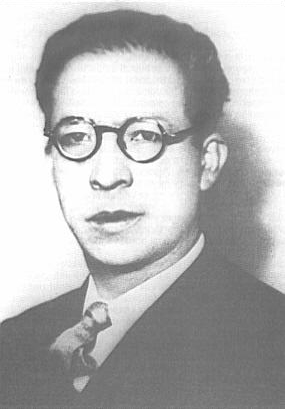
Gabriel Gosálvez – Minister of Government and Secretary-General (PSU)

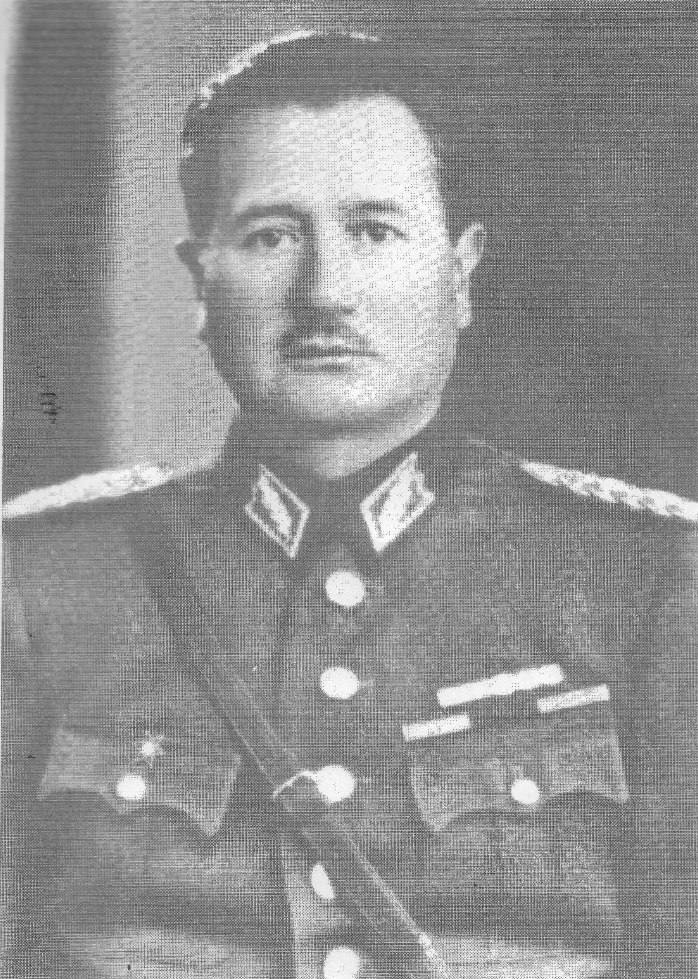
Felipe Manuel Rivera – Minister of National Defense and Minister of Mining

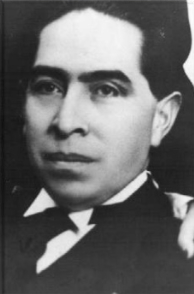
Vicente Mendoza López – Minister of Finance

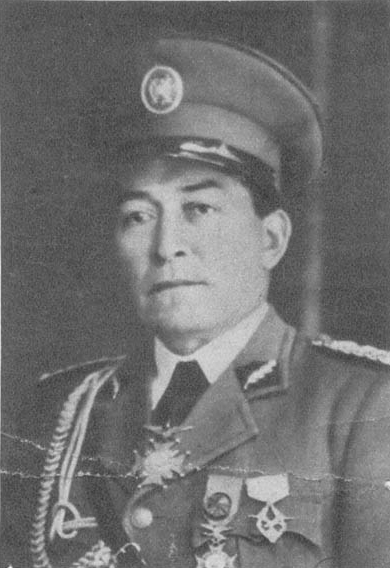
Angel Ayoroa – Minister of Industry

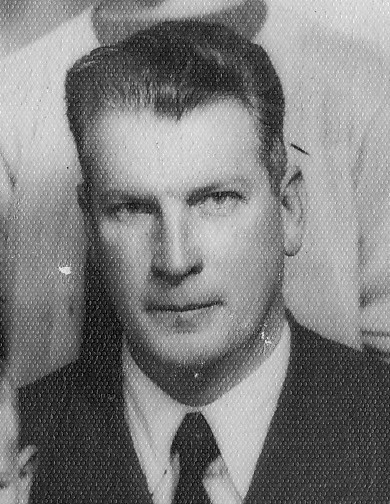
Dionisio Foianini – Minister of Mining

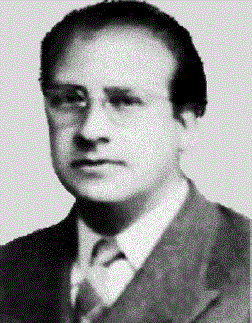
Héctor Ormachea Zalles – Minister of Education

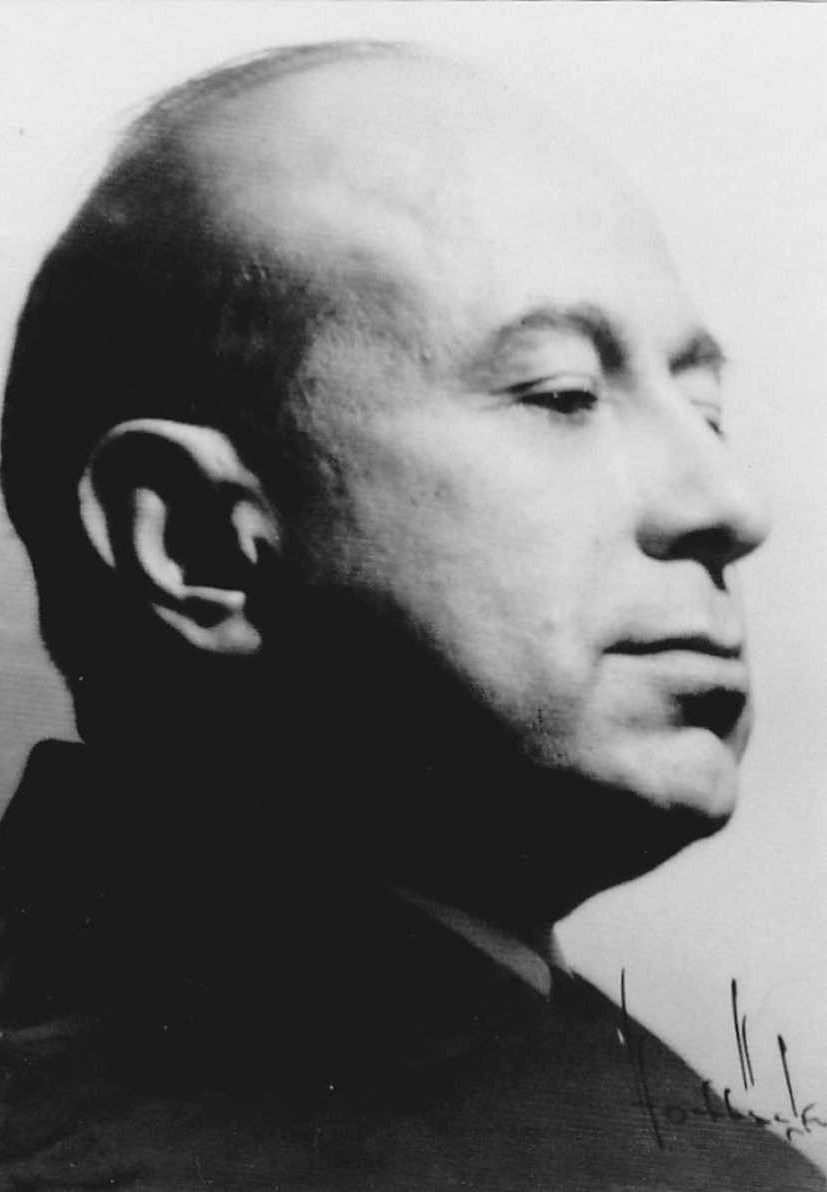
Bernardo Navajas Trigo – Minister of Education (PL)

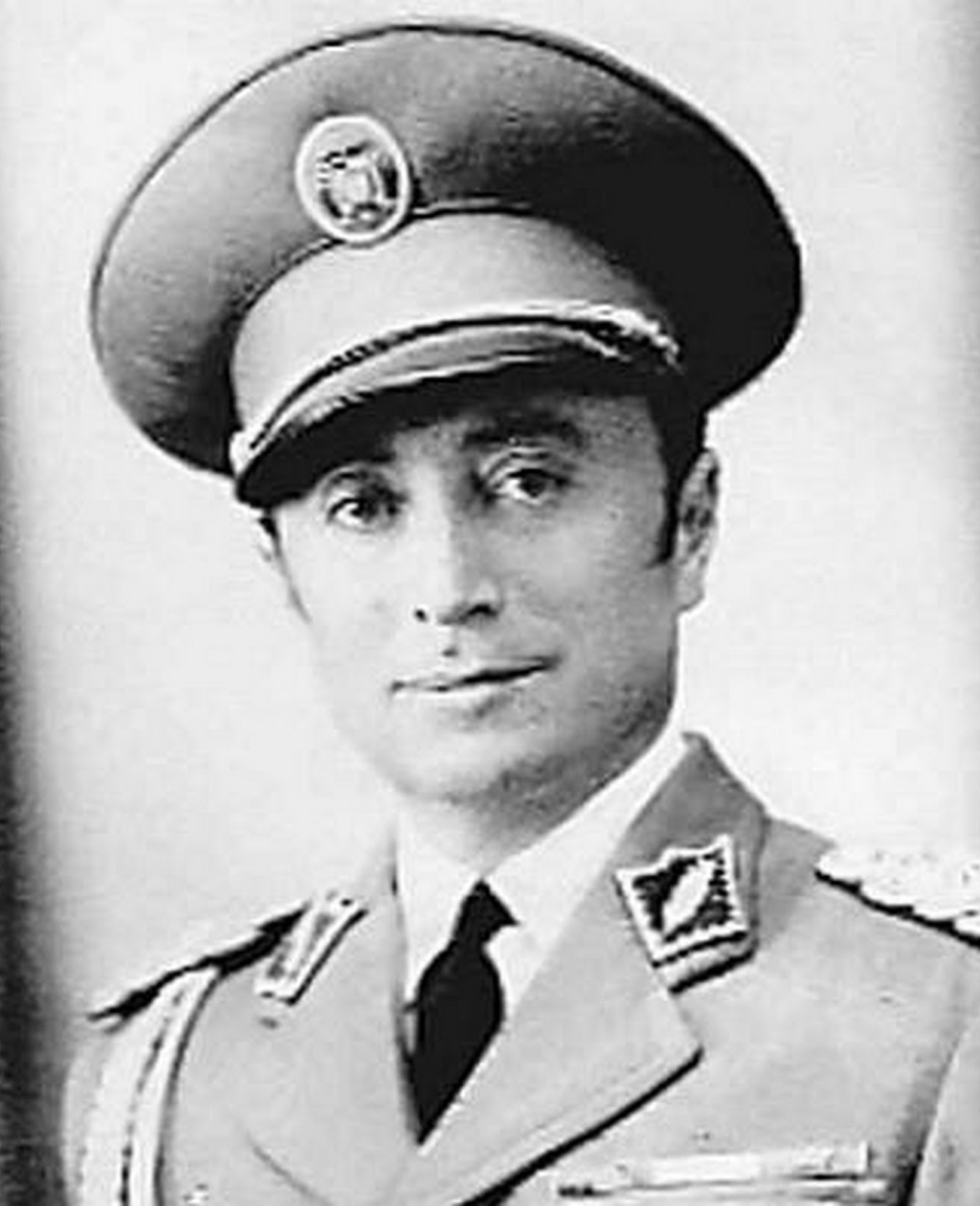
Daniel Sossa – Minister of Work

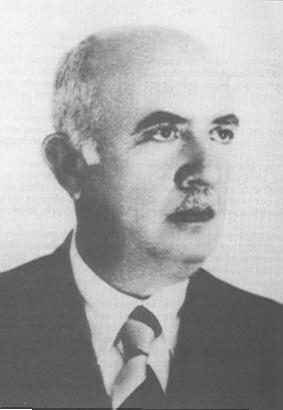
Julio Salmón – Minister of Agriculture (PL)

== Bibliography ==
- Gisbert, Carlos D. Mesa (2003). Presidentes de Bolivia: entre urnas y fusiles : el poder ejecutivo, los ministros de estado (in Spanish). Editorial Gisbert. pp. 342–344.
