= Government Junta of Bolivia (1936–1938) =

Civil-military junta ruling Bolivia (1936–1938)

The Government Junta of Bolivia (Spanish: Junta de Gobierno), known from 21 June 1936 as the Military Government Junta (Spanish: Junta Militar de Gobierno), was a civil-military junta which ruled Bolivia from 17 May 1936 through 28 May 1938. It consisted of representatives of both the armed forces as well as the civilian sector, including moderate socialists and organized labor leaders. The President of the Junta was Colonel David Toro who came to power on 22 May 1936, six days after a coup d'état which overthrew the previous government. Toro presided over a reformist experiment known as Military Socialism for a little over a year before being overthrown himself in another coup d'état which allowed Lieutenant Colonel Germán Busch to succeed to lead the junta on 13 July 1937. The junta was dissolved on 28 May 1938 when the National Convention elected Busch Constitutional President of the Republic.

== Formation ==
The aftermath of Bolivia's defeat in the Chaco War against Paraguay saw a swelling of national dissatisfaction with the traditional government establishment which had ruled the country for decades. The culmination of months of labor union demonstrations and left-wing opposition came on 17 May 1936 when the military under Lieutenant Colonel Germán Busch, the Chief of the General Staff and head of the La Paz garrison, forced the resignation of President José Luis Tejada Sorzano in a bloodless coup.

Following the coup, a civil-military junta was established in the Palacio Quemado composed of representatives from the various military and civilian sectors which had perpetrated it. Representing the latter were the moderate socialists Florencio Candia, Gabriel Gosálvez and Enrique Baldivieso, the heads of the recently formed United Socialist Party (PSU). Also included was Pedro Zilveti who was a member of the Socialist Republican Party (PRS) which, despite having been one of the three traditional political parties, had in February switched sides and signed a pact with Baldivieso's Socialists against the Liberal government.

In the first days of the junta, the military was represented exclusively by the young officer corps which, unlike the senior officers, had been far more sympathetic to the emerging left-wing movements in the country. The military representatives were the three lieutenant colonels Luis Cuenca, Jorge Jórdan, and Germán Busch. While Busch took charge of the junta, he did so only provisionally, calling upon his more politically experienced mentor, the Colonel David Toro, to assume the presidency. Toro had still been in the Chaco surveying troop disarmament and, by his own account, had not even been aware of the coup before it occurred. Nevertheless, he accepted the position, arriving in La Paz on 20 May and formally establishing the junta before being inaugurated as president on 22 May 1936.

=== June self-coup ===
Less than a month into the administration of the junta, the alliance between the PSU and PRS began to break down. The moderate socialists of the PSU remained distrustful of the PRS, whom they still regarded as members of the traditional conservative parties. Meanwhile, the PRS, under the leadership of the ex-president Bautista Saavedra, pushed hard for increased control over the government. The PRS, through its newspaper La República, decried the PSU as "communists" while the PSU, in turn, refused to work with the "rightists". Though President Toro attempted to quell the issue by offering Saavedra a diplomatic post outside of the country, Saavedra refused.

The conflict between the civilian political parties caused discomfort amongst the young officers. Finally on 21 June 1936, Busch enacted a self-coup which secured the permanent exile of Saavedra from the country and the termination of the co-government between the civil sectors and the military. In a manifesto justifying the military action, Busch stated that "Unhappily, the political reality which we were expecting did not correspond to the noble aspirations of the Army. The parties of the left, united by pacts which seemed solidly defined, did not delay in breaking them, giving us the spectacle of totally opposed appetites." From this point and until the end of the military socialist era in 1939, the military governed on its own with only the aid of individual politicians and the veteran and labor movements but without the participation of established political parties.

The self-coup was executed without the prior knowledge nor consent of Toro who reluctantly issued his own manifesto the following day in which he expressed his compliance with the military's decision. Though in another official statement Toro made a point to exonerate the PSU of any malfeasance, the coup was a major blow to the party from which it would never recover and resulted in Baldivieso's resignation as leader on 23 June, citing the invalidity of his position.

== Members ==
Junta President

David Toro,
from 22 May 1936

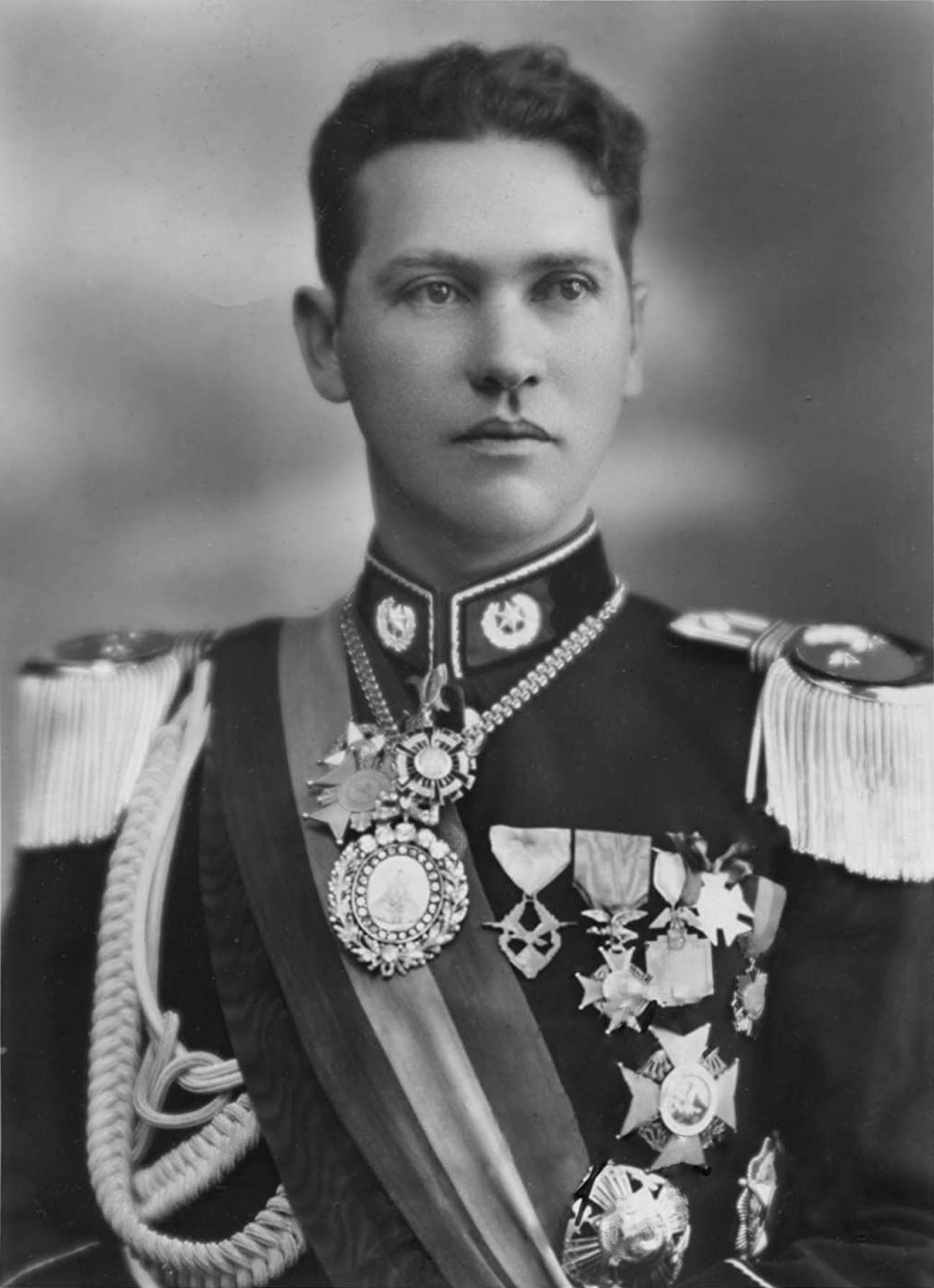
Germán Busch,
from 13 July 1937

Secretary-General

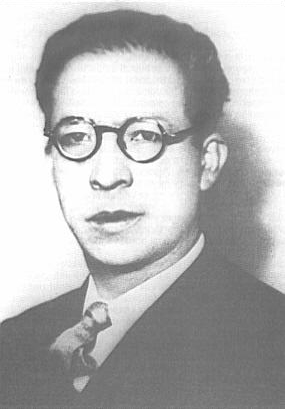
Gabriel Gosálvez

Government Junta of Bolivia 1936–1938
Member	Party	Representing	Office(s)
Germán Busch	Mil-Soc.	Military	Provisional President of the Junta
Germán Busch	Mil-Soc.	Military	Chief of the General Staff
David Toro	Mil-Soc.	Military	President of the Junta
Germán Busch	Mil-Soc.	Military	President of the Junta
Jorge Jórdan	Mil-Soc.	Military	Minister of Industry and Commerce
Luis Cuenca	Mil-Soc.	Military	–
Enrique Baldivieso	PSU	Civilian	Foreign Minister
Gabriel Gosálvez	PSU	Civilian	Minister of National Defense
Gabriel Gosálvez	PSU	Civilian	Secretary-General of the Junta
Pedro Zilveti	PRS	Civilian	Minister of Development and Communications
Florencio Candia	PSU	Civilian	Private Secretary of the President

== Dissolution ==
It would not take long for Busch and the military to grow tired of the slow pace of reforms enacted by Toro, who became increasingly unpopular in their and the public's eyes. On 13 July 1937, President Toro met with Busch and the General Enrique Peñaranda. After a lengthy cabinet meeting, Busch informed the president that he no longer had the army's support and requested his resignation. With General Peñaranda turning down Busch's empty offer to chair the junta, Toro resigned, allowing Busch to succeed him.

The following year, a National Convention was opened on 23 May 1938. On 28 May, it proclaimed Busch and Baldivieso the constitutional President and Vice President of the Republic, bringing an end to the de facto regime and dissolving the government junta.

== See also ==
- Cabinet of David Toro
- Cabinet of Germán Busch
- Military Socialism

== Bibliography ==
- Gisbert, Carlos D. Mesa (2003). Presidentes de Bolivia: entre urnas y fusiles : el poder ejecutivo, los ministros de estado (in Spanish). Editorial Gisbert.
- Klein, Herbert S. (May 1967). "Germán Busch and the Era of "Military Socialism" in Bolivia". The Hispanic American Historical Review. XLVII (2). Archived from the original on 7 October 2021.
