= Cabinet of Carlos Quintanilla =

Bolivian presidential administration and ministerial cabinet from 1939 to 1940

Quintanilla cabinet
- 101st Cabinet of the Republic of Bolivia
- 1939–1940
- Date formed: 23 August 1939
- Date dissolved: 15 April 1940

People and organisations
- President: Carlos Quintanilla
- Vice President: Vacant (1939); None (1939–1940)
- No. of ministers: 11 (on 15 April 1940)
- Member party: Caretaker government

History
- Predecessor: Cabinet of Germán Busch
- Successor: Cabinet of Enrique Peñaranda

Carlos Quintanilla assumed office as the interim 37th President of Bolivia on 23 August 1939, and his mandate ended on 15 April 1940. A general of the senior officer corps, Quintanilla assumed control of the presidency on an interim basis following the suicide of his predecessor, Germán Busch.

Quintanilla formed one cabinet three days after taking office, constituting the 101st national cabinet of Bolivia.

== Cabinet Ministers ==
Cabinet of Bolivia Interim Presidency of Carlos Quintanilla, 1939–1940
Office	Minister	Party	Prof.	Term	Days	N.C (Note: Denoting which national cabinet the minister was originally a part of.)	P.C (Note: Denoting which presidential cabinet the minister was originally a part of.)
President	Carlos Quintanilla	Military	Mil.	23 August 1939 – 15 April 1940	236	–	–
Vice President	Office vacant 23 August 1939 – 4 December 1939					–	–
Vice President	Office blank 4 December 1939 – 15 April 1940 (Note: Following the suicide of Germán Busch, Vice President Enrique Baldivieso tried to convince the military chiefs to allow him to assume the presidency. Instead, the military elevated the commander-in-chief of the army General Carlos Quintanilla to the office of president on the basis that since Busch had declared himself dictator four months prior, the constitutional order was thus null and void. Quintanilla would later abolish the office of the vice presidency entirely through a constitutional amendment on 4 December 1939.)						
Minister of Foreign Affairs and Worship (Chancellor)	Alberto Ostria Gutiérrez	–	Law.	26 August 1939 – 1 October 1941	767	101	1 (Note: Held over into the Peñaranda cabinet.)
Minister of Government, Justice, and Propaganda	Vicente Leyton	–	Law.	18 March 1939 – 15 April 1940	394	100 (Note: Originally a member of the 100th national cabinet of Bolivia.)	3 (Note: Originally a member of the third Busch ministerial cabinet.)
Minister of National Defense	Angel Ayoroa	Military	Mil.	26 August 1939 – 15 April 1940	233	101	1
Minister of Finance and Statistics	Fernando Pou Mont	–	Law.	26 August 1939 – 15 April 1940	233	101	1
Minister of Industry and Commerce	José E. Anze	–	–	26 August 1939 – 15 April 1940	233	101	1
Minister of Public Works and Communications	Rubén Terrazas (Note: Acting Foreign Minister in the absence of Alberto Ostria Gutiérrez from 23 September to 1 October 1939.)	PRG	Law.	26 August 1939 – 15 April 1940	233	101	1
Minister of Mining and Petrol	Felipe Manuel Rivera	Military	Mil.	26 August 1939 – 15 April 1940	233	101	1
Minister of Work and Social Security	Demetrio Ramos	Military	Mil.	26 August 1939 – 15 April 1940	233	101	1
Minister of Health and Hygiene	Alfredo Mollinedo	PSU	Dr.	22 August 1938 – 15 April 1940	602	100	3
Minister of Education, and Indigenous Affairs	Bernardo Navajas Trigo	PL	Law.	12 August 1938 – 15 April 1940	977	100	3
Minister of Agriculture, Colonization, and Immigration	Carlos Salinas Aramayo	PSU	Law.	26 August 1939 – 15 April 1940	233	101	1

== Composition ==
In his short mandate, Carlos Quintanilla only formed one ministerial cabinet. Of the 11 ministers, three (Minister of Government Vicente Leyton, Minister of Education Bernardo Navajas Trigo, and Minister of Health Alfredo Mollinedo) were direct holdovers from the Busch cabinet. In addition, Felipe Manuel Rivera, who had been Minister of Defense under Busch up until his death, was made Minister of Mining and Petrol, a position he had also held during the Busch administration. The new Minister of Defense replacing Rivera was Angel Ayoroa who had also served in the Busch cabinet as Minister of Industry.

On the same day as the establishment of the new cabinet, the Ministry of Propaganda was abolished. Notably, the office of the vice presidency was also abolished through a constitutional amendment on 4 December 1939. This decision came after Busch's vice president Enrique Baldivieso had attempted to claim his constitutional succession to the presidency.

The term of the Quintanilla cabinet ended on 15 April 1940 upon the inauguration of Enrique Peñaranda. Foreign Minister Alberto Ostria Gutiérrez would be the only direct holdover into the Peñaranda administration. Minister of Labor Demetrio Ramos would also remain in the Peñaranda administration but would be switched from Minister of Labor and made Minister of Defense and later Government. Finally, Minister of Public Works Rubén Terrazas would return as Minister of Education in 1942 while Minister of Agriculture Carlos Salinas Aramayo would be appointed Foreign Minister in 1943.

== Gallery ==
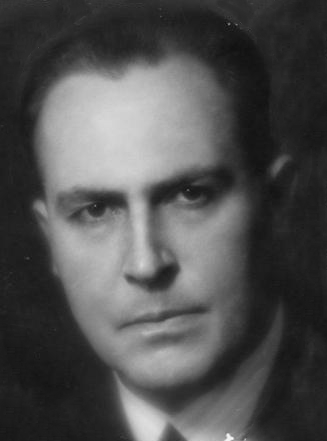
Alberto Ostria Gutiérrez – Minister of Foreign Affairs

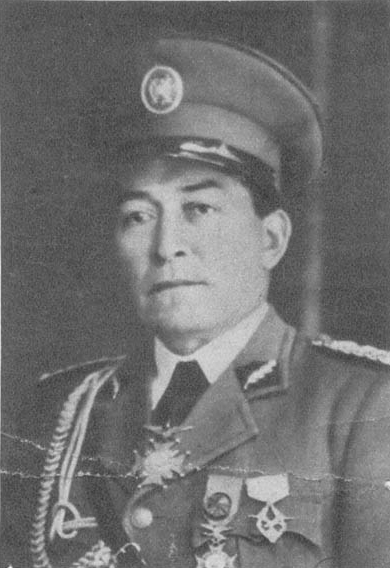
Angel Ayoroa – Minister of National Defense

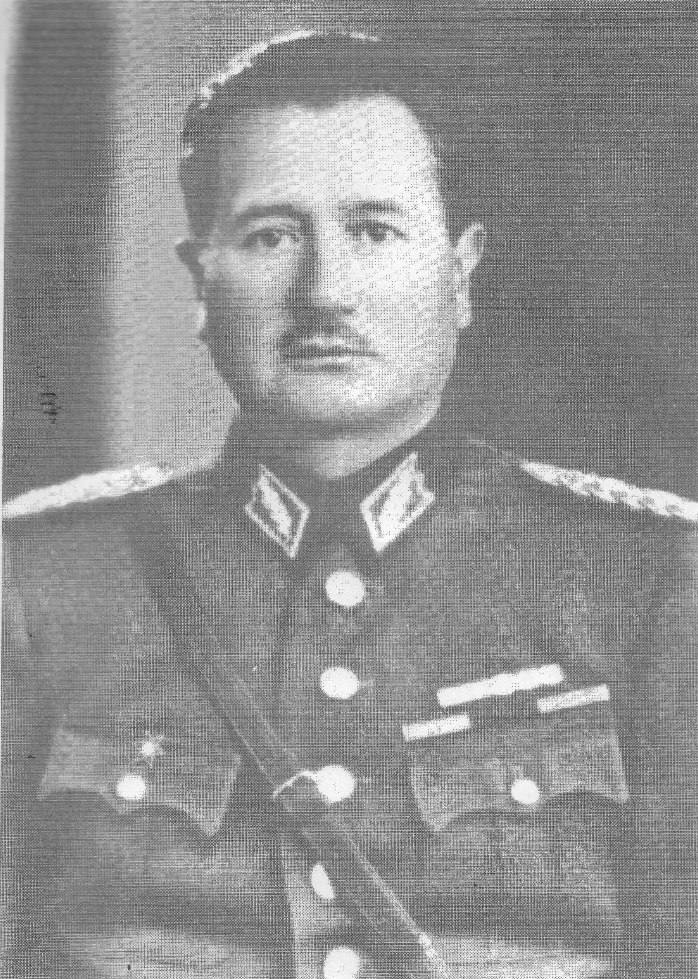
Felipe Manuel Rivera – Minister of Mining

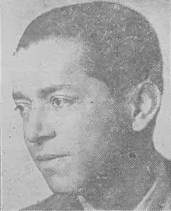
Rubén Terrazas – Minister of Public Works (PRG)

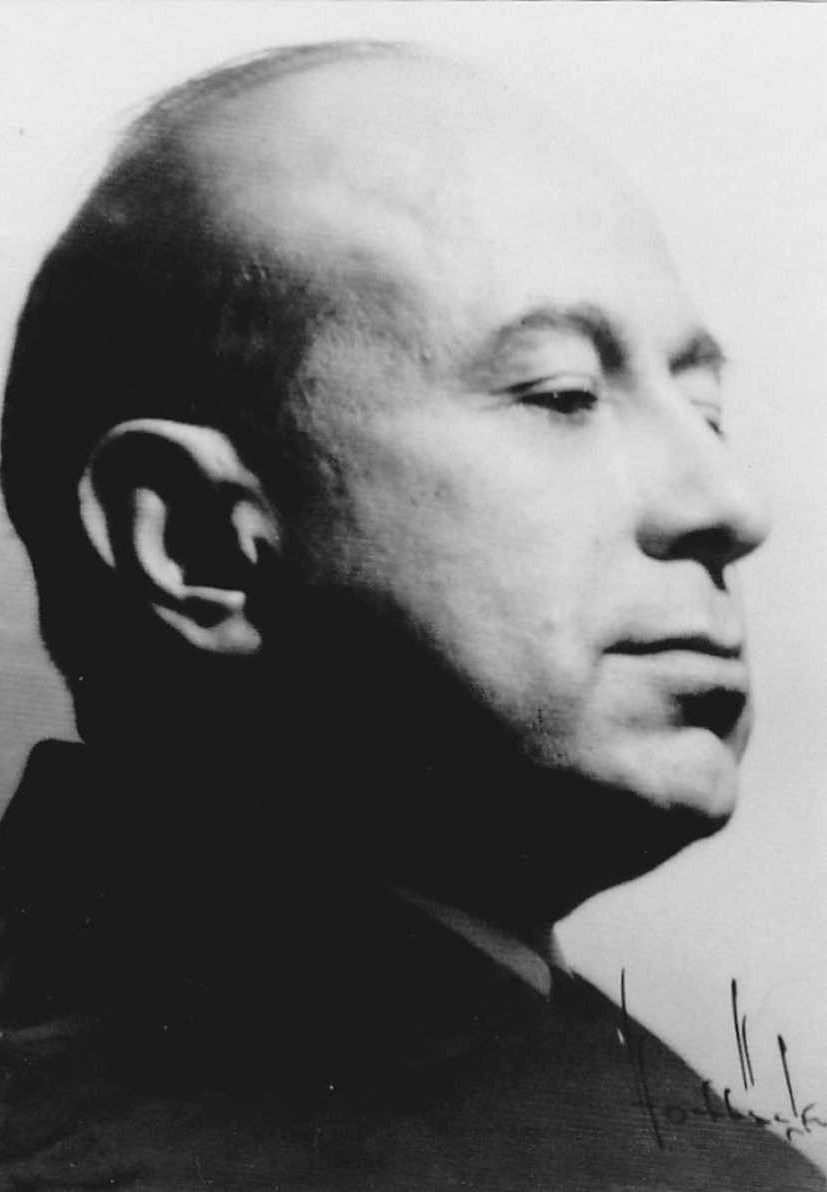
Bernardo Navajas Trigo – Minister of Education (PL)

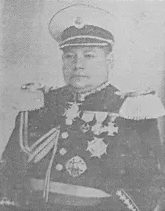
Demetrio Ramos – Minister of Work

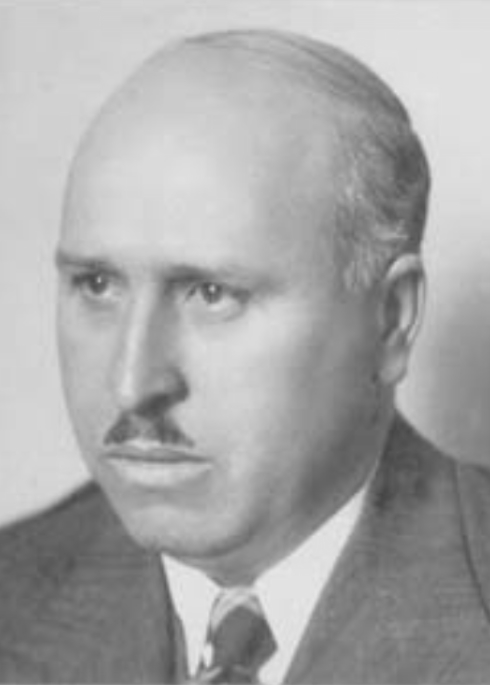
Carlos Salinas Aramayo – Minister of Agriculture (PSU)

== Bibliography ==
- Gisbert, Carlos D. Mesa (2003). Presidentes de Bolivia: entre urnas y fusiles : el poder ejecutivo, los ministros de estado (in Spanish). Editorial Gisbert. p. 344.
