= Gabriel Gosálvez =

Bolivian diplomat and economist

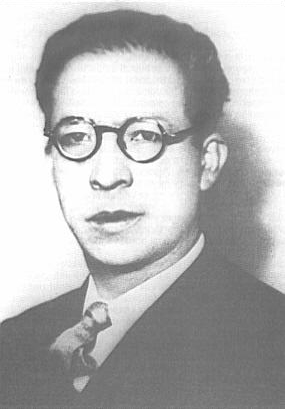

Minister of Government, Justice, and Propaganda
- In office 12 August 1938 – 18 March 1939
- President: Germán Busch
- Preceded by: César B. Menacho (as Minister of Government and Justice); Eduardo Díez de Medina (as Minister of Propaganda)
- Succeeded by: Vicente Leyton

Secretary-General of the Junta
- In office 13 July 1937 – 12 August 1938
- President: Germán Busch
- Preceded by: Office established
- Succeeded by: Office abolished

Minister of National Defense
- In office 17 May 1936 – 7 September 1936
- President: David Toro
- Preceded by: Luis Añez Rodríguez
- Succeeded by: Oscar Moscoso
- In office 14 December 1934 – 5 August 1935
- President: José Luis Tejada Sorzano
- Preceded by: Bautista Saavedra
- Succeeded by: Luis Añez Rodríguez
Other offices
Ambassador of Bolivia to Argentina
In office 1947–1950
| President | Enrique Hertzog; Mamerto Urriolagoitía |
| Preceded by | Adolfo Costa du Rels |
| Succeeded by | Armando Pinell Centellas |
President of the Central Bank of Bolivia
In office 1940–1941
| Preceded by | Armando Pacheco Iturralde |
| Succeeded by | Arturo Taborga Ramos |
Ambassador of Bolivia to the Holy See
In office 1939–1940
| President | Germán Busch; Carlos Quintanilla |
| Pope | Pius XII |
| Preceded by | David Alvéstegui Laredo |
| Succeeded by | Carlos Quintanilla |

Personal details
- Born: Gabriel Gosálvez Tejada; 15 November 1899 Yungas, Bolivia
- Died: 12 December 1957 (aged 58) Santiago, Chile
- Party: Republican Socialist Unity
- Other political affiliations: Republican (before 1937); United Socialist (1937–1946)
- Education: Higher University of San Andrés

Gabriel Gosálvez Tejada (15 November 1899 – 12 December 1957) was a Bolivian politician, journalist, economist, and diplomat. Throughout his political career, Gosálvez held various ministerial officers and diplomatic posts as a member of the United Socialist Party. When that party merged into the Republican Socialist Unity Party, Gosálvez was presented as its presidential candidate in the 1951 general election.

== Early life ==
Gabriel Gosálvez was born in the Yungas region of the La Paz Department on 15 November 1899. As a child, he moved to the capital La Paz where he studied at the National Institute of Commerce, later teaching there in 1921. During his time, Gosálvez developed the nickname Gabicho which he maintained for the rest of his life. He later entered the Higher University of San Andrés in 1911, graduating with a degree in Commercial and Financial Sciences on 24 February 1923.

In 1920, Gosálvez participated in the foundation of El Hombre Libre, a newspaper which voiced its support for radical elements of the Bolivian left-wing. His journalistic work continued with the foundation of the nationalist magazine Bolivia in 1922 with himself as director. In 1923 and 1924 he also joined in founding the daily La República and Fragua in La Paz.

== Political career ==
=== Republican politics ===
Gosálvez's political background lead him to become a predominant figure in the left wing of the Republican Party. When that party split in 1921, he joined the Saavedra faction of the Republican Party. As a member of the PRS, he was chosen by interim President Felipe Segundo Guzmán to head the Private Secretary of the Presidency of the Republic, a position he kept during the government of Hernando Siles Reyes. In 1927, he was a member of the Bolivian delegation to the Sixth Pan American Conference in Havana, Cuba where he presented a project to the assembly regarding the guarantees of the rights of women.

Gosálvez's diplomatic career began in 1928 when he was appointed Extraordinary Councilor in the Bolivian Legation in Argentina. In 1929, he returned to present himself as a candidate for Deputy of La Paz. From 1930 to 1931 he returned to diplomatic work, exercising the position of Bolivian Consul in Italy. During the Chaco War on 14 December 1934, Gosálvez was appointed Minister of National Defense by President José Luis Tejada Sorzano, a position he held until 5 August 1935.

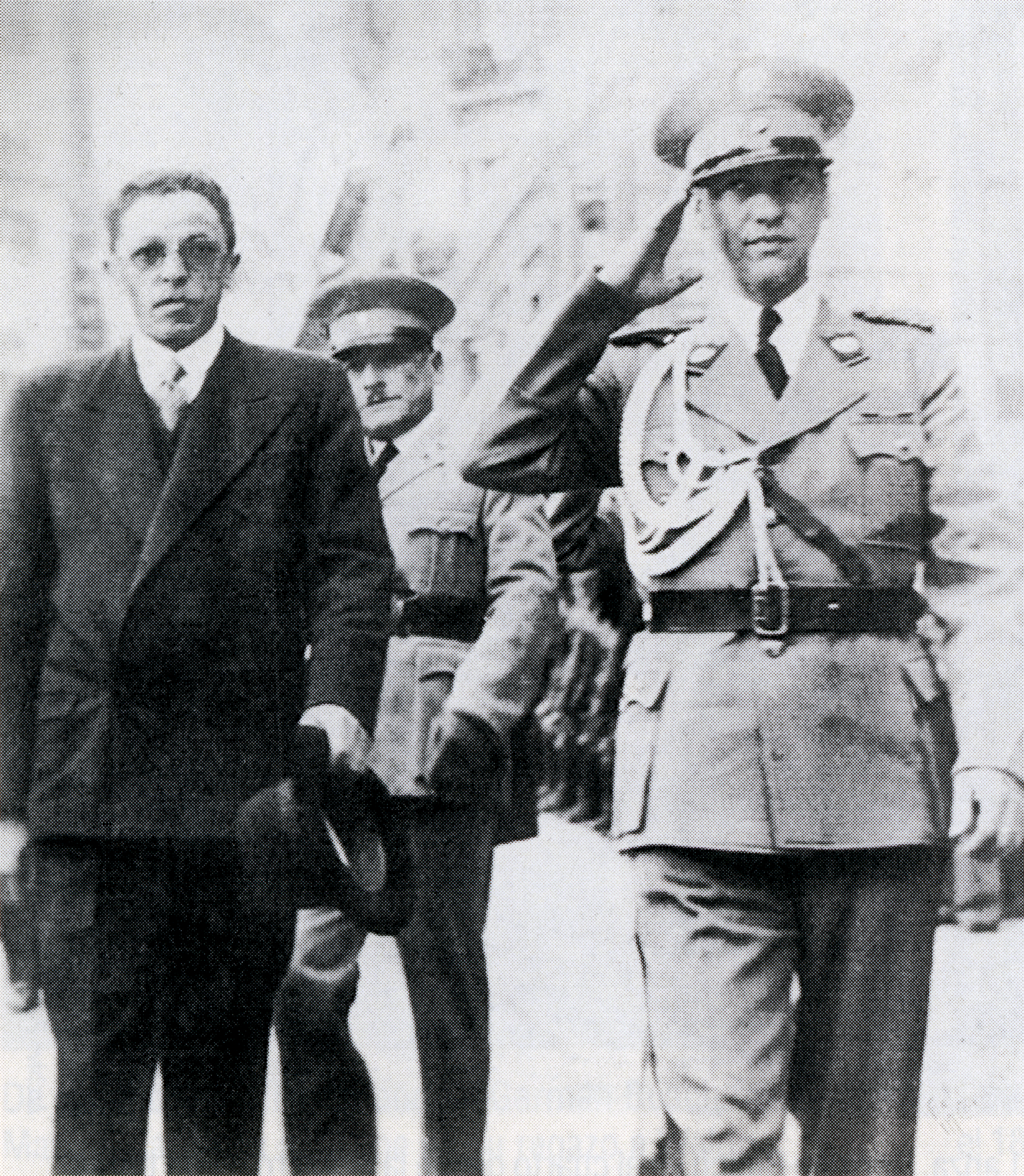
Gosálvez returns to the Government Palace accompanied by President Germán Busch, August 6, 1938.

=== Socialist politics ===
The end of the Chaco War, which resulted in a disastrous loss of territory for Bolivia, led to wide-ranging discontent with the traditional conservative political order led by the Liberal and Republican (Socialist and Genuine) parties. In the midst of a surge in left-wing agitation, Gosálvez left the Socialist Republican Party and joined the leadership of the newly formed United Socialist Party. In May 1936, the PSU supported the coup d'état which toppled Tejada Sorzano and brought Colonel David Toro to power as the head of a civil-military junta.

Gosálvez joined the junta as Minister of National Defense from 17 May to 7 September 1936. After that, Gosálvez briefly left political activity, declining the invitation given by Toro on 17 October to attend as Minister Plenipotentiary the peace conference between Bolivia and Paraguay in Buenos Aires. When Toro was overthrown by lieutenant colonel Germán Busch on 13 July 1937, Gosálvez returned to ministerial politics as Secretary-General of the Junta and later Minister of Government, Justice, and Propaganda. While in these offices, he was the acting Foreign Minister on two separate occasions in the absence of both Enrique Baldivieso and Eduardo Díez de Medina.

As Minister of Government, Gosálvez became a close advisor to President Busch, teaming with the former president of the national convention Renato Riverín to bring together the disparate factions of the left-wing into a unified, government-supported Socialist Party. However, the bloc suffered from a lack of strong commitment on the part of President Busch. On 18 March 1939, Gosálvez resigned from the portfolio of government in order to dedicate himself purely to diplomatic work. The loose united front he worked to form quickly collapsed when Vicente Leyton, his successor as Government Minister, refused to join it.

== Diplomatic career ==
Gosálvez then travelled to Rome where from 1939 to 1940 he served as the Bolivian Ambassador to the Holy See. Upon his return to Bolivia in 1940, he was appointed President of the Central Bank until 1941.

In 1943, Gosálvez returned to diplomacy when he accompanied President Enrique Peñaranda as Extraordinary Ambassador during Peñaranda's diplomatic tour of the Americas from 30 April to 5 July 1943. Peñaranda was overthrown on 20 December of that same year. When that occurred, the United Socialist Party split with supporters of the new President Gualberto Villarroel forming the Independent Socialist Party. When Villarroel was himself overthrown by a popular revolt in 1946, Gosálvez, who remained with the original PSU, joined with other conservative political parties in the formation of Republican Socialist Unity Party on 10 November 1946.

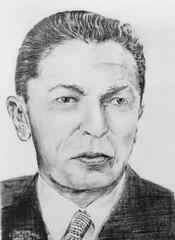
Gosálvez as President of the Central Bank of Bolivia

That same year, Gosálvez was elected President of the National Chamber of Commerce. In 1947, the newly elected Enrique Hertzog of the PURS appointed Gosálvez Ambassador to Argentina, a position he exercised from 1947 to 1950. He was tasked with formalising commercial agreements and realizing a railway project.

=== 1951 general election ===
In 1950, while still Ambassador to Argentina, the leadership of the PURS chose Gosálvez as their presidential candidate in the following year's general elections. In alliance with the Social Democratic Party, the PURS competed against Víctor Paz Estenssoro of the Revolutionary Nationalist Movement. At campaign events, Gosálvez proclaimed that "Social peace will be my way of governing and socialism my program of action." On 17 January 1951, he published the Discourse Program of the Candidate for the Presidency of the Republic in which he outlined his political policies.

However, the elections held on 6 May did not conclude in victory for the PURS-PSD ticket. Gosálvez and his running mate Roberto Arce came second in the official count with Gosálvez winning 40,381 votes (32.01%). Paz Estenssoro came out victorious with 54,129 votes (42.91%). Nevertheless, as no candidate reached an outright majority of the popular vote, the decision to elect the president was ultimately up to the National Congress to choose between the top three contenders. Given that no faction other than the MNR itself was willing to back Paz Estenssoro, the congressional ballot favored Gosálvez. It is perhaps surprising, then, that Gosálvez chose to withdraw his name from consideration, the second time in a row a second place candidate would do so after Luis Fernando Guachalla in 1947. Despite this, President Mamerto Urriolagoitía, unwilling to hand power to Paz Estenssoro, enacted a self-coup, resigning and handing power to a military junta under Hugo Ballivián who annulled the election results.

The National Revolution which occurred the following year deposed Ballivián and brought Paz Estenssoro to power. Many leaders and members of the traditional parties, including Gosálvez, were forced into exile. Gabriel Gosálvez fled to Santiago, Chile where he died in exile on 12 December 1957 at age 58. His remains were repatriated to Bolivia ten years later on 7 April 1967 and buried the following day. The event was attended by then Foreign Minister Alberto Crespo Gutiérrez, Luis Fernando Guachalla, Vice President Luis Adolfo Siles Salinas, and President René Barrientos himself.

Of Gosálvez, the diplomat Alberto Ostria Gutiérrez would say that "There was in his soul a passion, a holy passion: that of homeland. He loved it obsessively and from a very young age he was devoted to it. Thus did he hold the statesman career [...]"

== Bibliography ==
- Gisbert, Carlos D. Mesa (2003). Presidentes de Bolivia: entre urnas y fusiles : el poder ejecutivo, los ministros de estado (in Spanish). Editorial Gisbert.

Political offices
| Preceded by Bautista Saavedra | Minister of National Defense; 1934–1935 | Succeeded by Luis Añez Rodríguez |
| Preceded by Luis Añez Rodríguez | Minister of National Defense; 1936 | Succeeded by Oscar Moscoso |
| Preceded by Office established | Secretary-General of the Junta; 1937–1938 | Succeeded by Office abolished |
| Preceded by César B. Menacho as Minister of Government and Justice | Minister of Government, Justice, and Propaganda; 1938–1939 | Succeeded by Vicente Leyton |
| Preceded by Eduardo Díez de Medina as Minister of Propaganda | Minister of Government, Justice, and Propaganda; 1938–1939 | Succeeded by Vicente Leyton |
Diplomatic posts
| Preceded by David Alvéstegui; Laredo | Ambassador of Bolivia to the Holy See; 1939–1940 | Succeeded by Carlos Quintanilla |
| Preceded by Adolfo Costa du Rels | Ambassador of Bolivia to Argentina; 1947–1950 | Succeeded by Armando Pinell; Centellas |
Government offices
| Preceded by Armando Pacheco; Iturralde | President of the Central Bank of Bolivia; 1940–1941 | Succeeded by Arturo Taborga; Ramos |
Party political offices
| Preceded by Enrique Hertzog | Republican Socialist Unity nominee for President of Bolivia; 1951 | Succeeded by Enrique Hertzog |
