= Dionisio Foianini =

Bolivian politician and businessman

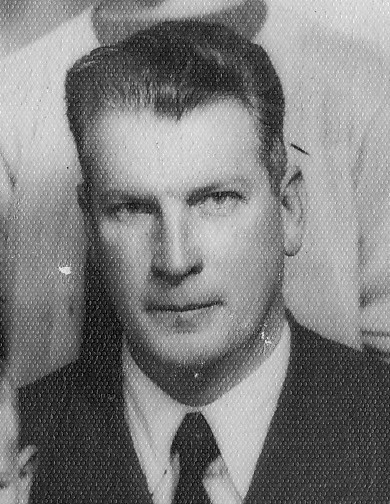

Minister of Mining and Petrol
- In office 12 August 1938 – 23 August 1939
- President: Germán Busch
- Preceded by: Felipe Manuel Rivera
- Succeeded by: Felipe Manuel Rivera

Minister of Foreign Affairs and Worship
- Acting
- In office 22 May 1939 – 19 July 1939
- Preceded by: Eduardo Díez de Medina
- Succeeded by: Eduardo Díez de Medina

Personal details
- Born: Dionisio Foianini Banzer; 28 February 1903; Santa Cruz de la Sierra, Bolivia
- Died: 23 November 2001 (aged 98)
- Spouse: Dorothy Ryder
- Children: Dionisio Foianini Ryder
- Parent(s): Dionisio Foianini Ioli; Carmen Banzer Aliaga
- Education: University of Pavia

Dionisio Foianini Banzer (28 February 1903 – 23 November 2001) was a Bolivian politician and businessman from Santa Cruz de la Sierra. He was one of the founders of YPFB in 1937.

The son of an Italian father, Dionisio Foianini Ioli, and a Bolivian mother, Carmen Banzer Aliaga, he grew up in central Bolivia not far from most of Standard Oil's Bolivian fields. After studying pharmacy in Italy, where he came to admire Benito Mussolini's fascism, Foianini returned to Bolivia before the Chaco War broke out and was put in charge of munitions manufacture. During the war, he went on a secret mission to Argentina and organized Bolivian espionage behind Paraguayan lines. When the war ended, Foianini organized the nationalization of the Standard Oil fields and set up a State Petroleum Board. After Germán Busch organized a coup in 1937, Foianini became Minister of Mines and Petroleum in Busch's Cabinet.

The area called Dionisio Foianini Triangle on the border with Paraguay and Brazil is named after him. Puerto Busch, which is named after Germán Busch, is located in the triangle.

Political offices
Preceded by Felipe Manuel Rivera	Minister of Mining and Petrol; 1938–1939	Succeeded by Felipe Manuel Rivera
