= Enrique Finot =

Bolivian writer, historian and diplomat

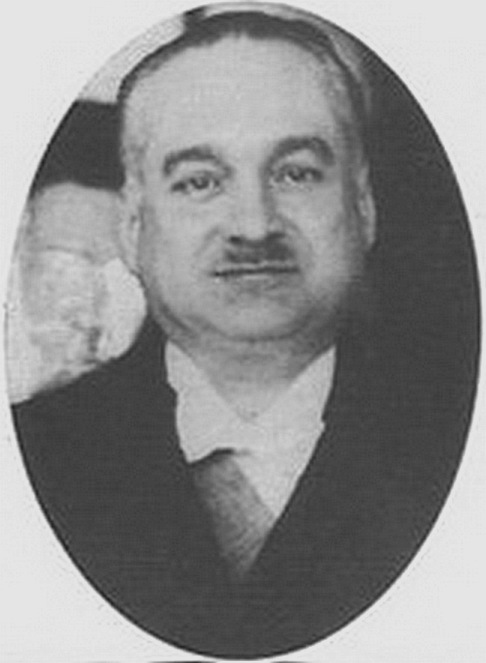
- Born: 16 September 1891; Santa Cruz de la Sierra, Bolivia
- Died: 23 December 1952 (aged 61)
- Occupation(s): Historian, writer, editor, diplomat
- Known for: Serving as foreign minister under Colonel David Toro

Enrique Finot (16 September 1891 – 23 December 1952) was a Bolivian historian writer, editor, and diplomat. He served as foreign minister under Colonel David Toro and during the period of his nationalizing Standard Oil. He has been described as conservative.

== Biography ==
He was born in Santa Cruz de la Sierra, Bolivia, on 16 September 1890, son of the French engineer Juan Francisco Finot and the Bolivian Olinfa Oliva.

Enrique Finot received his education at Colegio Nacional Florida in Santa Cruz de la Sierra, before continuing his studies at the Escuela Normal de Maestros de Sucre, now known as the Escuela Superior de Formación de Maestros Mariscal Sucre.

In 1908 he qualified as a professor of drawing and cartography and dedicated himself to teaching for a few years, during which time he wrote Historia de la pedagogía boliviana.

He entered the diplomatic service in 1917, which took him to Peru, Argentina, the United States and Mexico.

Political offices
Preceded by Enrique Baldivieso	Foreign Minister of Bolivia; 1936–1937	Succeeded by Enrique Baldivieso
