= 1936 Bolivian coup d'état =

Coup d'état in Bolivia on 17 May 1936

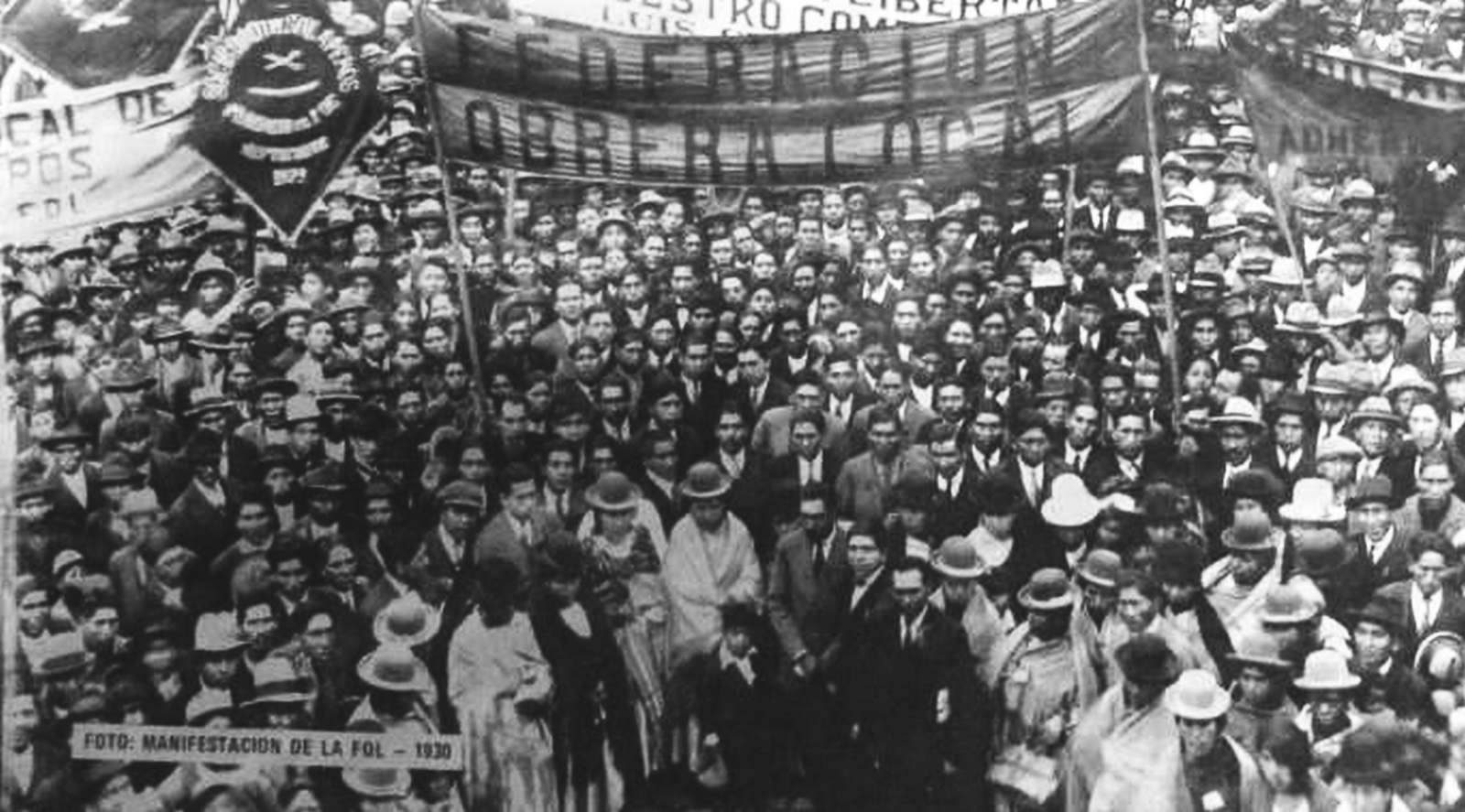
- Strikers of the Local Workers' Federation (FOL)
Date	16–17 May 1936
Location	La Paz, Bolivia
Action	Armed forces under Germán Busch supported by labor movements and leftist parties put the country under civil-military control.
Result	President José Luis Tejada Sorzano and traditional political parties overthrown; Civil-military Junta led by Colonel David Toro assumes power on 22 May

Belligerents
(Bolivia) Bolivian Government: Liberal Party	Bolivian Armed Forces: Bolivian Army

Commanders and leaders
(Bolivia) José Luis Tejada Sorzano	Germán Busch; David Toro (Bolivia) Waldó Álvarez

Political support
Genuine Republican Party	United Socialist Party; Socialist Republican Party; Federation of Workers of Labor; Local Workers' Federation

The 1936 Bolivian coup d'état, also known as the Socialist Revolution of 1936, was a civil-military coup in Bolivia that deposed President José Luis Tejada Sorzano, bringing an end to traditional political order and bringing forward the period of Military Socialism in the country. On 17 May 1936, following the largest strike movement known until then in Bolivia, the military under the young lieutenant colonel Germán Busch overthrew the government of Tejada. Busch held the reins of government until 22 May when Colonel David Toro arrived from the Chaco and assumed the presidency under a military junta supported by the army, organized labor, and the United Socialist Party.

== Political background ==
The Chaco War (1932–1935) came to an end on 14 June 1935. The conclusion of the conflict was overseen by President José Luis Tejada Sorzano. He had been the vice president of Daniel Salamanca who in November 1934 was deposed by the military after having been in frequent conflict with the high command since the beginning of the war. Wishing to maintain democratic appearances, the army allowed Vice President Tejada Sorzano to assume the presidency.

Bolivia's disastrous defeat in the Chaco War had the immediate effect of plunging the nation into turmoil. The traditional political class which had ruled the country for half a century, and which Tejada Sorzano was a part of, saw its support evaporate as veterans returned to civilian life seeking a change in the status quo. Tejada Sorzano faced discontent from both the military and the civilian populace as well rapidly rising inflation as a result of the Chaco War and the Great Depression.

=== Gridlock in government ===
The inability of the traditional parties to deal with the rising political tensions has been attributed to their failure to coalesce in the face of the rapidly unifying social movements. The main point of contention blocking a coalition were disputes over leadership. President Salamanca had been a member of the Genuine Republican Party (PRG) but his vice president José Luis Tejada Sorzano was a member of the Liberal Party (PL). Elections had been held in 1934 which the PRG candidate Franz Tamayo won but, given the coup which occurred the same month, the results were annulled. Because of this, the PRG continued to push for Tamayo to be accepted while the Liberals wished to keep Tejada Sorzano as president. The third faction, the Socialist Republican Party (PRS) played the PRG and PL off of one another, maintaining the political gridlock.

=== Upheaval in the military ===
The military found itself dealing with internal conflict of its own. The senior officer class, discredited by failed tactics during the Chaco War, was forced to step aside in favor of the young officers led by the immensely popular lieutenant colonel Germán Busch. While Busch was a competent military man, his lack of political ability led him and the young officers around him to accept the more politically tactful Colonel David Toro as the leader of their movement. The result of all this was a leftward shift in military command which was far more sympathetic to the emerging social movement in the country.

=== Labor unions strike ===
Among the biggest concerns for the government was the return of organized labor. The labor movement was bolstered by discontent with the spiralling economy and the return of union organizers, soon surpassing their 1932 peak of influence. Beginning in 1935, workers strikes were organized, led by the two major labor unions, the Federation of Workers of Labor (FOT) and the Local Workers' Federation (FOL). In response to rising prices in November, the FOT made a call for 100% wage increases for workers and a reduction in rental prices and consumer goods. This set in motion a chain of strikes across the country sending it into crisis.

== Crisis and coup ==
Measures enacted by the government amounted to the "single exchange decree" which devalued the Boliviano and served only to exacerbate the situation. Finally, the FOT, led by labor activist Waldo Álvarez, sent an ultimatum to the government demanding free importation of basic necessities, the 100% increase in wages, the reduction of rent, the prohibition of work night, the suspension of the state of siege, guarantees for freedom of assembly, association, press and union organization, home for the maimed and disabled of war, and work for ex-combatants.

On 15 April 1936, the newspaper La República reported that "the FOT was preparing a great rally." The event did not occur due to lack of authorization but the point was made and negotiations between the FOT and the government began. However, these collapsed on 25 April. As a result, strikes worsened to the point that on 10 May newspapers themselves closed as journalists joined in the strike. By this point, the protests had evolved into the largest strike movement the country had ever seen at that time.

The strikes, supported by the FOT and the FOL, also received the endorsement of the newly established United Socialist Party (PSU) bringing a more radical left-wing element to them. A formal alliance was established between the PSU and the FOT on 15 May with the signatures of Carlos Montenegro and Waldo Álvarez, among others. Last resort attempts by the government to form a national unity cabinet with the opposition fell flat. The Liberals had actually lost a component of their coalition when on 4 February the Socialist Republicans, seeing the writing on the wall, jumped ship, signing a "pact" with the PSU against the government.

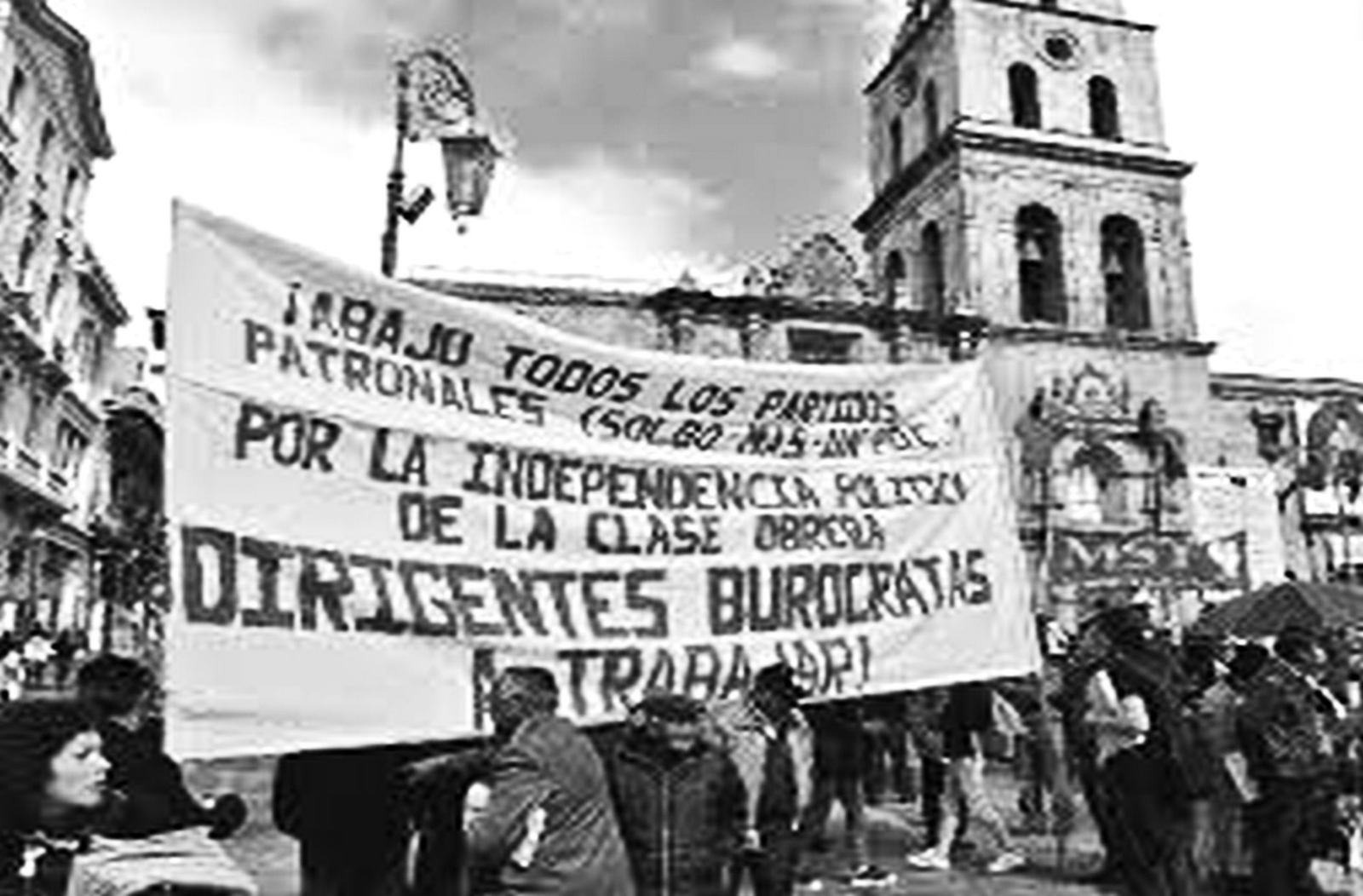
A union mobilization in the Plaza San Francisco in the city of La Paz

Given the danger of a revolt, the government called on the military to intervene. La Calle reported that the army had been ordered to "fire on the people if they were in favor of the strike." However, there would be no suppression by the military as Álvarez had managed to meet with David Toro and Germán Busch and had secured commitments of non-intervention.

The culmination of these strikes came on the night of 16 May 1936. A "Revolutionary Committee" made up of Enrique Baldivieso, Carlos Montenegro, and Augusto Céspedes among many others began a series of overtly revolutionary movements in La Paz. The Club de la Unión "a place of the aristocracy" was occupied and a red flag raised at the site. This was followed by the Mayor's Office which found itself entirely surrounded by leftist militants.

Finally on the morning of 17 May, the military stepped in and issued an official demand that President José Luis Tejada Sorzano resign. The president would later claim that at the time of the coup he had been "sleeping tranquilly in my private residence, when at about 7:30 in the morning I was awoken by the caretaker of my children who told me that at the front door there were some civilians and soldiers who said to look for me. Long time ago familiar with the revolutionary bustles, I understood that my mandate had ended. I indicated that she should tell the commissioners that I was in bed and that I would be able to receive them at 9:00." The request to wait was denied and Tejada Sorzano subsequently issued a short proclamation to the nation renouncing his presidency. He is quoted as having told one of the soldiers to "Tell Colonel Busch, without misrepresenting my words, that I have not ceased to praise his chivalry and military prowess and that I deplore for him that he has been placed in this situation." The former president soon after left the country for exile in Arica, Chile.

== Aftermath and legacy ==
The coup passed without bloodshed and received broad social support. A civil-military junta was put in place which appointed Germán Busch provisional president until Colonel David Toro could return from surveying troop disarmament in the Chaco. In the afternoon of 17 May, the new regime and the trade unions under Álvarez began negotiations with Busch who agreed to all of the demands listed. The following day, the unions ordered that "all employees, workers in commerce, industry, banks, railways and transport, return to their respective jobs immediately." Toro arrived on 20 May and assumed the presidency on 22 May. On the same day, a decree was issued granting broad amnesty to all those prosecuted, confined and exiled for political crimes while the state of siege and restrictions on the press were lifted.

The success of the revolt was a shock to the Liberal oligarchy and brought an end to their strong grip on power. Began was a short era of an experimental idea known as Military Socialism which would be championed by both Toro and Busch until the latter's untimely demise in 1939. The first anniversary of the "Socialist Revolution of 1936" was declared a national holiday in 1937.

== See also ==
- Government Junta of Bolivia (1936–1938)
- Cabinet of David Toro
- Cabinet of Germán Busch
- Military Socialism
