= Coups d'état in Bolivia =

Aspect of Bolivian history

Bolivia has experienced more than 190 coups d'état and revolutions since its independence was declared in 1825. Since 1950, Bolivia has seen the most coups of any country. The most recent attempted coup d'état was in 2024, led by General Juan José Zúñiga.

== Mutiny of 18 April 1828 ==
While classified as an army mutiny, the events of 18 April 1828 resulted in the deposition of President Antonio José de Sucre and have been considered the first coup in Bolivian history. Orchestrated by Casimiro Olañeta and promoted by Peruvian General Agustín Gamarra, the event saw an uprising by the military garrison in Chuquisaca. In an attempt to quell the riot, Sucre was wounded in the arm. As a result, command was delegated to José María Pérez de Urdininea who served as interim president until Sucre officially resigned on 2 August 1828. In the following years, General Gamarra would invade Bolivia, occupying large portions of the country.

Pedro Blanco Soto, the pro-Peru president elected by the Constituent assembly on 18 December 1828 and who took office on 26 December would himself be deposed just a week after assuming office. Military leadership under Colonel José Ballivián arrested Blanco and imprisoned him in a convent called La Recoletta where he would be assassinated on New Year's Day 1829.

== Coups of 1839–1879 ==
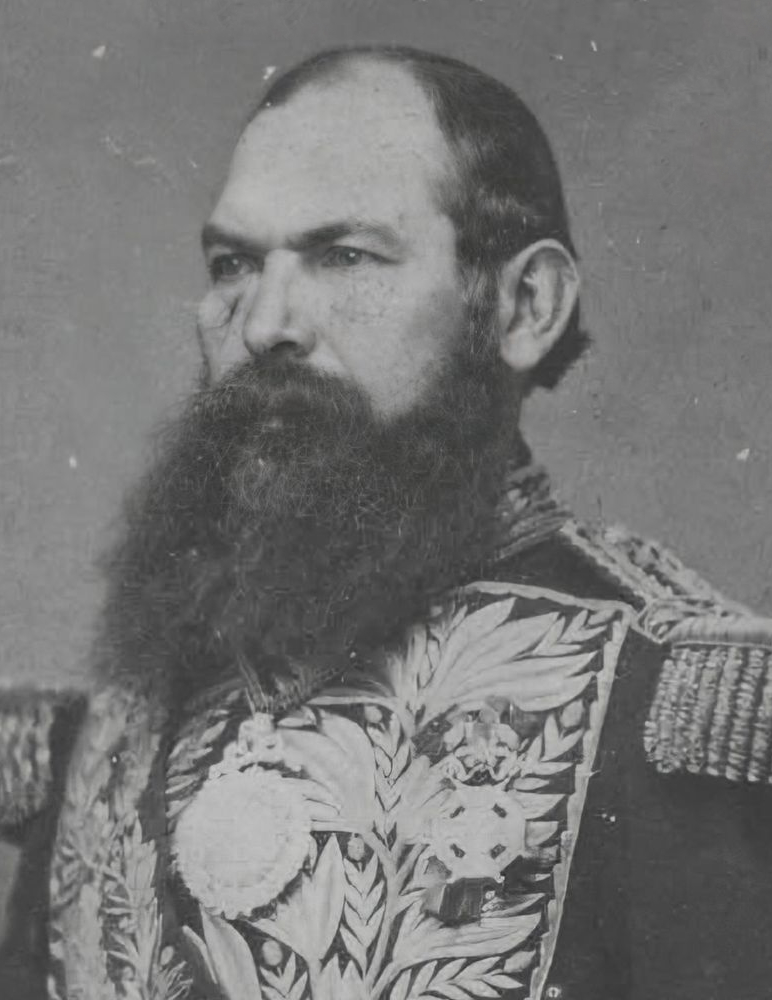
Mariano Melgarejo climbed the ranks of the armed forces, aided by his willingness to participate in rebellions

The internal anarchy which resulted in the dissolution of the Peru–Bolivian Confederation ended with the resignation of Andrés de Santa Cruz on 20 February 1839. The chaotic political climate of the ensuing days which saw José Ballivián unsuccessfully declare himself president would end on 22 February when José Miguel de Velasco assumed the presidency. The following decades from 1839 to 1879 would see a succession of various military leaders overthrow one another with brief periods of democracy intermixed.

=== Coups d'état in Bolivia (1839–1879) ===
- 10 June 1841: Sebastián Ágreda overthrows José Miguel de Velasco Franco and cedes command to Mariano Enrique Calvo, a pro-Andrés de Santa Cruz loyalist, on 9 July.
- 22 September 1841: José Ballivián overthrows Mariano Enrique Calvo.
- 2 January 1848: Ballivián, weary of the growing conflict with the General Manuel Isidoro Belzu, resigns from office on 23 December 1847. His successor, Eusebio Guilarte rules for just over a week before being deposed by Belzu on 2 January 1848. Belzu then installs José Miguel de Velasco as president.
- 6 December 1848: Manuel Isidoro Belzu overthrows José Miguel de Velasco. A bloody counter-coup by General Velasco is put down, with Belzu commanding the troops that crushed Velasco's.
- 9 September 1857: Belzu "retires" and calls elections which are won by Jorge Córdova, Belzu's son-in-law. Córdova rules as a proxy for Belzu until supporters of José María Linares proclaim him president in Oruro rising militarily against the government. Córdova and his forces were finally defeated by the Linaristas in Cochabamba on 27 September.
- 14 January 1861: José María Linares is overthrown by his own government ministers José María de Achá, Ruperto Fernández, and Manuel Antonio Sánchez.
- 28 December 1864: Mariano Melgarejo overthrows the unpopular José María de Achá, prevailing over the competing forces of Belzu.
- 15 January 1871: Agustín Morales overthrows Mariano Melgarejo.
- 4 May 1876: Hilarión Daza overthrows Tomás Frías Ametller.
- 28 December 1879: During the government of Hilarión Daza, the War of the Pacific commences between Peru and Bolivia against Chile. Daza personally leads portions of the Bolivian military in the conflict. Faced with the encroaching victory of the Chilean army, Daza was declared deposed in his absence on 28 December 1879. Narciso Campero is proclaimed president on 19 January 1880 beginning a period of democracy led by the Conservative Party.

== Federal War ==
The Conservative Era ended with the Bolivian Civil War, also known as the Federal War, in which the Liberals under José Manuel Pando deposed President Severo Fernández on 12 April 1899. The ensuing Liberal Era was the longest period of uninterrupted single-party rule in Bolivian history. It ended on 12 August 1920 when President José Gutiérrez Guerra was deposed by the Socialist Republican Party of Bautista Saavedra.

== Coups of 1930–1946 ==
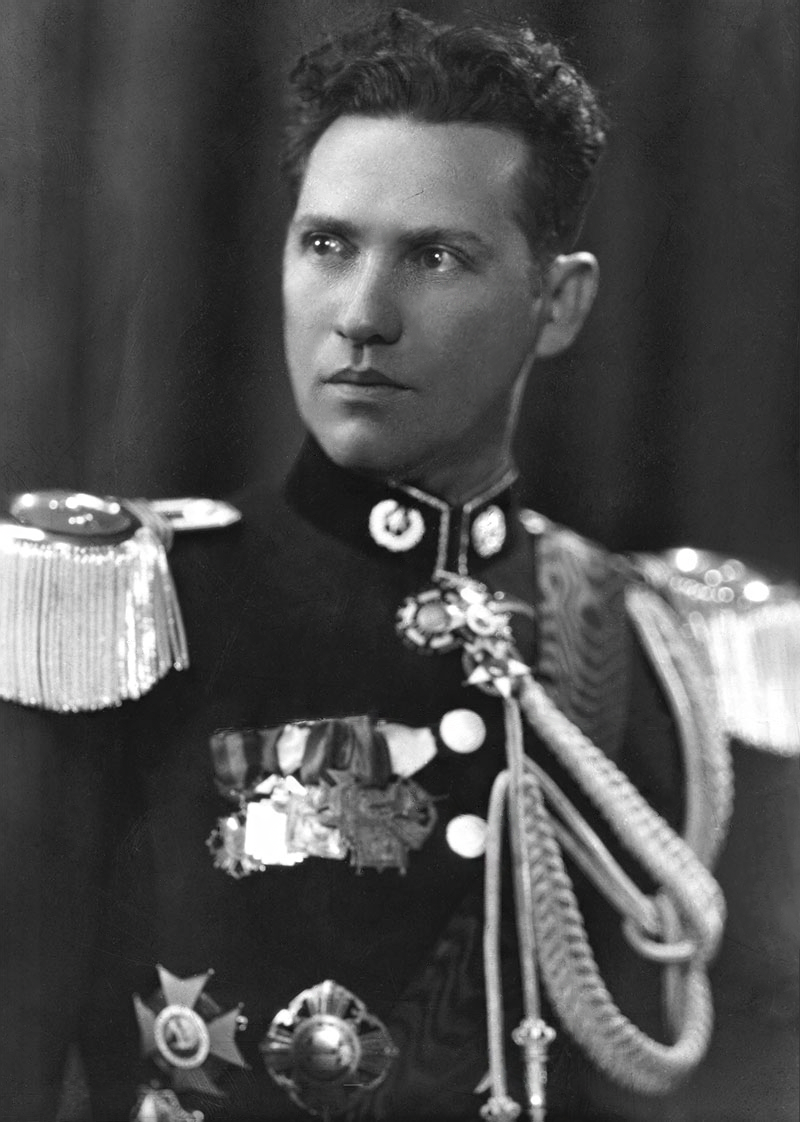
Germán Busch participated in the overthrow of all three of his predecessors

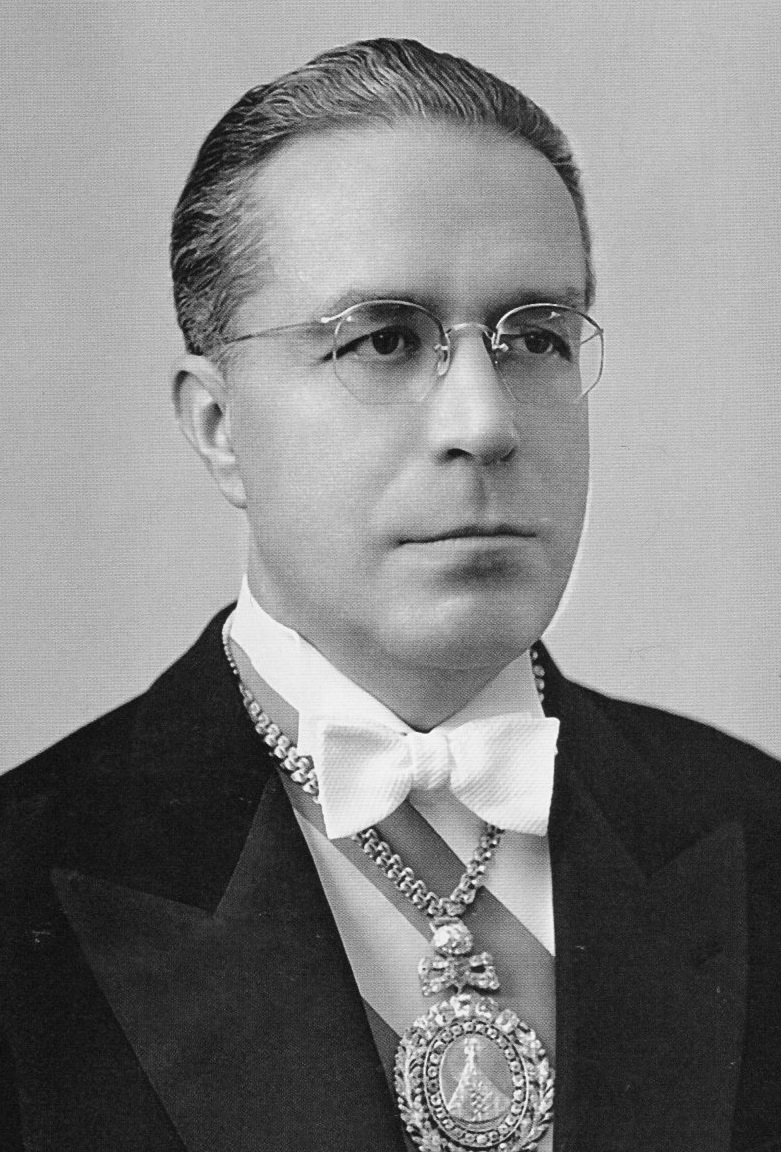
Víctor Paz Estenssoro and the MNR were the perpetrators and victims of many coups and revolutions in the 1950s

Many of the coups in this era would be sparked by the instability forged by Bolivia's loss against Paraguay in the Chaco War which birthed a reformist class of young veterans dissatisfied by the traditional oligarchic parties.

=== Coups d'état in Bolivia (1930–1946) ===
- 28 June 1930: Faced with the effects of the Great Depression in Latin America, President Hernando Siles Reyes resigns from office on 28 May 1930, entrusting his ministerial cabinet with command of the executive. The cabinet is overthrown a month later by General Carlos Blanco Galindo.
- 27 November 1934: Conflicts between President Daniel Salamanca and military high command during the Chaco War resulted in the so-called Corrallto de Villamontes. The young officer Germán Busch, under the direction of Colonel David Toro and General Enrique Peñaranda, overthrows Daniel Salamanca miles from the front line. Vice President José Luis Tejada is allowed to assume office in order to keep democratic appearances.
- 17 May 1936: Germán Busch overthrows the unpopular José Luis Tejada and installs David Toro as president two days later.
- 13 July 1937: Germán Busch, dissatisfied with the slow reforms of David Toro, leads a popular movement to secure Toro's resignation.
- 20 December 1943: Gualberto Villarroel and the MNR overthrow Enrique Peñaranda who had returned the country to the pre-Chaco War status quo following the death of Busch.
- 21 July 1946: Gualberto Villarroel is lynched by an enraged mob and an interim junta is established headed by Néstor Guillén and later Tomás Monje.

Following the death of Villarroel, the age of left-wing military regimes came to an end. The Republican Socialist Unity Party (PURS) under Enrique Hertzog and later Mamerto Urriolagoitía returned the country to the status quo.

== Sexenio and the National Revolution of 1952 ==
The so-called sexenio were the six years between 1946 and 1952 in which the traditional conservative order briefly returned to power. Attempts by the left-wing to reassert control failed militarily in 1949 and legally in 1951 but were successful in 1952. A period of democratic control by the Revolutionary Nationalist Movement (MNR) saw failed attempted coups by the right-wing until the military overthrew the new order in 1965.

=== Coups d'état in Bolivia (1949–1964) ===
- 27 August–12 September 1949: The so-called "Civil War" of 1949. Uprisings by MNR militants in four cities lead to a parallel government being declared in Santa Cruz de la Sierra under the interim presidency of Edmundo Roca. Víctor Paz Estenssoro (exiled in Argentina) is declared president but the government in La Paz regains control on 12 September.
- 16 May 1951: General elections held on 6 May 1951 end in the victory of the MNR and the election of Víctor Paz Estenssoro as president. The results are not accepted by President Mamerto Urriolagoitía who enacts a self-coup known as the Mamertazo, resigning and installing General Hugo Ballivián as president on 16 May 1951.
- 11 April 1952: The Bolivian National Revolution of 1952. Hugo Ballivián is deposed on 11 April 1952. Hernán Siles Zuazo, Paz Estenssoro's 1951 running mate, assumes command until 15 April when Paz Estenssoro arrives from exile to take the presidency. A period of democratic elections won by the MNR begins.
- 21 October 1958: The Bolivian Socialist Falange (FSB), the main conservative opposition to the MNR, fail to overthrow the now-president Hernán Siles Zuazo.
- 19 April 1959: A second attempted coup by the FSB ended in a failed assassination attempt against Siles Zuazo. The subsequent massacre resulted in many deaths and the suicide of Óscar Únzaga, the FSB leader.
- 5 November 1964: Víctor Paz Estenssoro, who won a nonconsecutive term in 1960, is deposed by René Barrientos, his own vice president, and General Alfredo Ovando. This brings an end to stable democratic rule in Bolivia for almost two decades until 1982.

== Coups of 1966–1984 ==
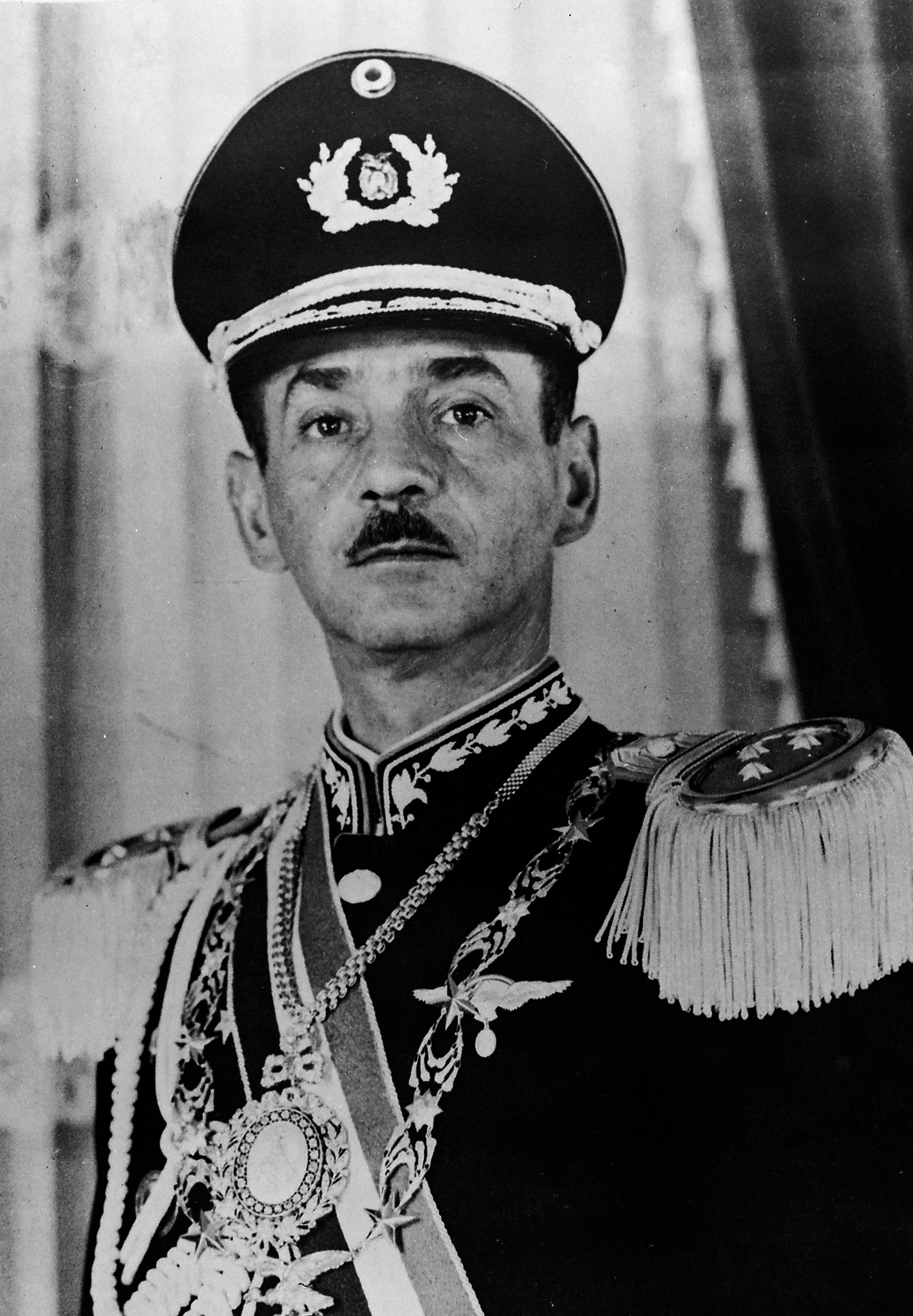
Hugo Banzer maintained a military dictatorship for most of the 1970s

In 1966, Barrientos was elected in his own right but died soon after in a helicopter crash theorized to be masterminded by Ovando. The period after this would see over a decade of dictatorships by various military officers who assumed the presidency as a result of multiple coups.

=== Coups d'état in Bolivia (1966–1984) ===
- 26 September 1969: Vice President Luis Adolfo Siles Salinas succeeds Barrientos after his death in April but is soon after overthrown by General Alfredo Ovando.
- 6 October 1970: Ovando is deposed in a coup d'état led by the chiefs of the army, air force, and navy. However, the military triumvirate lasts less than a day before being overthrown by Ovando loyalists led by Juan José Torres. Ovando agrees not to return to the presidency entrusting it with Torres.
- 21 August 1971: Hugo Banzer overthrows Juan José Torres. Banzer would maintain his dictatorship for most of the 1970s.
- 7 November 1974: Military revolt against Banzer in Santa Cruz de la Sierra is put down. Following this, Banzer dropped all pretenses of holding future elections, banned all political activity, and proceeded to rule henceforth solely with military support until 1978.
- 21 July 1978: Juan Pereda overthrows the military junta installed by Hugo Banzer following his resignation.
- 24 November 1978: David Padilla overthrows Juan Pereda. Following the inconclusive 1979 general elections, Padilla hands power to Wálter Guevara on an interim basis.
- 1 November 1979: Alberto Natusch overthrows Wálter Guevara but resigns two weeks later in favor of Lidia Gueiler Tejada.
- 17 July 1980: Luis García Meza overthrows Lidia Gueiler Tejada.
- 30 June 1984: President Hernan Siles Zuazo was arrested for ten hours. The coup was ultimately a failure.

== Coups in the 21st century ==
- 10 November 2019: Bolivian president Evo Morales was forced to step down under pressure from the military and police, after which Jeanine Añez was installed as the new president. There has been debate over whether this constituted a coup or not. A number of Latin American politicians, including Luiz Inácio Lula da Silva, Nicolás Maduro, Marcelo Ebrard, Alberto Fernández and Miguel Díaz-Canel, as well as the Uruguayan government described Morales' forced resignation as a coup.
- 26 June 2024: In an attempt to overthrow president Luis Arce, commander of the Bolivian Army General Juan José Zúñiga surrounded the Plaza Murillo with soldiers and tanks, but backed down and was dismissed. Zúñiga was arrested later that day.

== See also ==
- History of Bolivia
- List of coups and coup attempts by country
