= Eduardo Díez de Medina =

Bolivian politician (1881–1955)

Eduardo Díez de Medina (8 February 1881 – 27 June 1955), was born in La Paz, Bolivia, and was Bolivia's Minister of Foreign Affairs and Worship on three occasions. In 1941, Diez de Medina submitted himself to trial after he was accused of selling life-saving Bolivian visas to up to 15,000 Jews in Europe during World War II.

== Political career ==
Medina was Bolivia's Minister of Foreign Affairs and Worship in 1923, 1925, and from 1936 to 1939.

He signed the Carillo-Diez de Medina treaty on 9 July 1925 with Argentine representative Horacio Carillo, which settled a long border dispute between Argentina and Bolivia. He also negotiated with U.S. Secretary of State Frank B. Kellogg a plan to grant Bolivia the city of Arica, thereby granting it access to the sea. The plan, which was to result from an American mediation between Peru and Chile, failed due to a change in U.S. foreign policy following the election of President Herbert Hoover. Diez de Medina also enacted, together with Peruvian emissary M. Elias Bonemaison, the Treaty of 23 September 1902, which demarcated the border between Bolivia and Peru. In addition, he served as Latin American liaison to the League of Nations.

In 1941, Diez de Medina fell out of favour amidst a jingoistic political climate when he voluntarily submitted himself to trial after he was accused of selling life-saving Bolivian visas to up to 15,000 Jews in Berlin, Warsaw, Kaunas and Stockholm. Over 1,000 blank immigration permits were found for distribution in Warsaw, Hamburg, Genoa, and Paris.

Political offices
Preceded by David Alvéstegui Laredo	Foreign Minister of Bolivia; 1923	Succeeded by Román Paz
Preceded by Román Paz	Foreign Minister of Bolivia; 1925–1926	Succeeded by Alberto Gutiérrez
Preceded by Enrique Baldivieso Aparicio	Foreign Minister of Bolivia; 1937–1939	Succeeded by Alberto Ostria Gutiérrez
