= David Toro =

President of Bolivia from 1936 to 1937

Colonel David Toro
- Portrait by Luigi Domenico Gismondi, c. 1936

35th President of Bolivia
- In office 20 May 1936 – 13 July 1937
- Vice President: Vacant
- Preceded by: José Luis Tejada
- Succeeded by: Germán Busch
Other offices
President of the Government Junta
In office 20 May 1936 – 13 July 1937
Preceded by	Germán Busch (provisional)
Succeeded by	Germán Busch
Minister of Government and Justice
In office 17 June 1930 – 28 June 1930
President	Council of Ministers
Preceded by	Germán Antelo
Succeeded by	Oscar Mariaca
Minister of Development and Communications
In office 16 May 1930 – 17 June 1930
President	Hernando Siles; Council of Ministers
Preceded by	Manuel Rigoberto Paredes
Succeeded by	Carlos Banzer

Personal details
- Born: José David Toro Ruilova; 24 June 1898 Sucre, Bolivia
- Died: 25 July 1977 (aged 79) Santiago, Chile
- Spouse: Serafina Abaroa
- Children: Hugo; René; Olga
- Parents: Mariano Toro; Teresa Ruilova
- Relatives: Enrique Toro (nephew)
- Education: Military College of the Army

Military service
- Allegiance: Bolivia
- Branch/service: Bolivian Army
- Rank: Colonel
- Battles/wars: Chaco War

José David Toro Ruilova (24 June 1898 – 25 July 1977) was a Bolivian military officer and politician who served as the 35th president of Bolivia from 1936 to 1937. He previously served as minister of development and minister of government in 1930.

Toro pursued military service in the Armed Forces and stood out for both his tactical skill and shrewd political instincts. He served as minister under Hernando Siles and led the cabinet as the sole executive authority after Siles resigned in a bid to extend his term. Toro and the other ministers were overthrown shortly thereafter in the 1930 coup. He was forced into exile. He spent a stint as military attaché in Argentina but returned to the general staff during the Chaco War. Toro's decision-making during the conflict, which Bolivia lost, generated controversy.

In 1936, a coup d'état in La Paz installed Toro as president of a government junta. He presided over an experimental period of military socialism in Bolivia that introduced moderate socialist reforms. Toro instituted YPFB as the state-owned petroleum enterprise, established a state monopoly on the sale of hydrocarbons, and nationalized the holdings of Standard Oil in 1937.

Toro's regime drew support from members of the veterans' movement. In 1937, dissatisfied with the slow pace of reforms, Toro was forced to resign in a soft coup.

== Early life ==
He became major in 1925. He became a close associate of General Hans Kundt and President Hernando Siles.

== Biography ==
Installed in the Palacio Quemado, Toro immediately faced a number of pressing crises, not least of which were a massive federal deficit stemming from the war and continued economic dislocation associated with the ongoing Great Depression. More narrowly, he tackled a dispute with the Standard Oil Corporation, which had been at least not supportive enough of Bolivia during the war and at most, downright duplicitous and disloyal to the country. Apparently, a number of grave irregularities had been committed, including alleged smuggling of Bolivian oil to Argentina, Paraguay's most steadfast (if always under the table) supporter. In March 1937, the Toro government nationalized all Standard Oil holdings in Bolivia to the rejoicing of much of the population. This nationalization would prove to be the first step toward the statism that would characterize Bolivian politics in subsequent decades. It was an unprecedented move in the region, pre-empting the larger Mexican oil expropriation under Lázaro Cárdenas a year later.

Moreover, the nationalization signalled the beginning of the end of the Oligarchic Republic, inaugurated in 1880 upon Bolivia's devastating loss to Chile in the War of the Pacific. This was a period of civilian control of Bolivian politics and little intervention of the army in the political process, except on brief occasions and always either on behalf of a civilian caudillo or in order to call elections. The Chaco War, however, had changed everything. Tens of thousands of Bolivian Indians had been conscripted to fight in the war and had made major sacrifices on behalf of a government that discriminated against them and barred them any meaningful participation in national affairs. Coincidentally, the 1930s had witnessed the onset of much political ferment throughout the world, and Bolivia was not completely at the margin of those trends. During the turbulent, crisis-racked decade, a number of Communist, Stalinist, Trotskyist, anarchist, and reformist parties had been created, and new currents of thought began to call for major changes in Bolivian society. Toro and the young officers who had installed him called their experiment "Military Socialism," but, fearful of the still considerable power of the economic elites, failed to go far enough with their reforms. Despite this, several progressive social reforms were nevertheless carried out during Toro's presidency.

A new Pay Raise Decree for government and private employees was issued, while to tackle inflation a number of anti-speculation and price control laws were decreed while State Food Stores were set up (a noted by one study) “to sell items of prime necessity at government-subsidized prices.” A special advisory commission was set up to study civil rights for women which came up with (as one study has noted) “a whole new set of juridical criteria that became decree laws a few months later.” Study commissions were set up to work on a complete labor code, together with worker savings plans and national social security programs. By the late Thirties and early Forties, these commissions succeeded (as noted by one study) “in creating a whole new body of advanced social legislation for Bolivia.” A minimum wage was effected while a Ministry of Labor was established. A decree was issued providing for the obligatory unionization of miners, craftsmen and factory workers, which radical left-wing elements in the new Labor Ministry used to promote the unionization of workers in the mining centers and cities. A Secretariat of Peasant Affairs was also set up within the Ministry of Labor, which helped set up the nation’s first legally recognized agricultural workers’ union.

A Supreme Decree of March 1937 allowed workers (as one study has noted) “to either remain in their position or resign with compensation in the event of a salary reduction,” while another decree issued that same month sought to ensure safe and healthy working conditions in mines through government supervision. In addition, a decree of June 1937 sought to ensure that those in need had access to credit. In addition, a decree of September 1936 specified 16 days as holidays. Marriages performed by clerics were legalized, the expulsion of colonos was prohibited if (as noted by one study) “they had worked on the haciendas for two consecutive or three discontinuous years,” and the organization of peasant sindicatos on church and municipal properties was authorized. In addition, a “free school” for the Checa ayllu in Loyaza Province was authorized, and pecuniary aid to teachers was provided.

In the end, Toro was caught between the cross currents of reformers from the left, and the interests of a mining magnate. On 13 July 1937, Toro resigned the presidency and Lieutenant Colonel Germán Busch assumed the presidency. Toro attempted to dislodge Busch from power a year after his ouster, but his coup attempt failed and he sought exile in Chile, where he died on 25 July 1977, at the age of 79.

One observer has described Toro as such:

Though one of the most astute political figures of his day, and also one of the most sensitive to the tone of contemporary political life, Toro was a pragmatic politician without fixed orientation or ideological commitment. Because of his own rather hedonistic nature and lack of ideological conviction, he never led but merely followed the major themes that others mapped out. Nevertheless, he always set his own style upon these developments, no matter how belated his commitment to them was, and he also attempted to fit these new ideas into a fairly coherent pattern. Because of these qualities, his regime set the tone for the entire period of "military socialist" rule. Though of a lesser stature than his martyred successor, Toro nevertheless had an important impact on the government of Germán Busch and the two together in their era of "military socialism" set the foundations upon which their civilian successors would build a lasting revolutionary society.

== Publications ==
- Toro Ruilova, David (1941). Mi actuación en la Guerra del Chaco: La retirada de Picuiba (in Spanish). La Paz: Editorial Renacimiento. OCLC 1255856243.

== See also ==
- Cabinet of David Toro

Political offices
Preceded by Manuel Rigoberto Paredes	Minister of Development and Communications; 1930	Succeeded by Carlos Banzer
Preceded by Germán Antelo	Minister of Government and Justice; 1930	Succeeded by Oscar Mariaca
Preceded by José Luis Tejada	President of Bolivia; 1936–1937	Succeeded by Germán Busch
Government offices
Preceded by Germán Busch	President of the Government Junta; 1936–1937	Succeeded by Germán Busch
