= Enrique Baldivieso =

Bolivian politician (1902–1957)

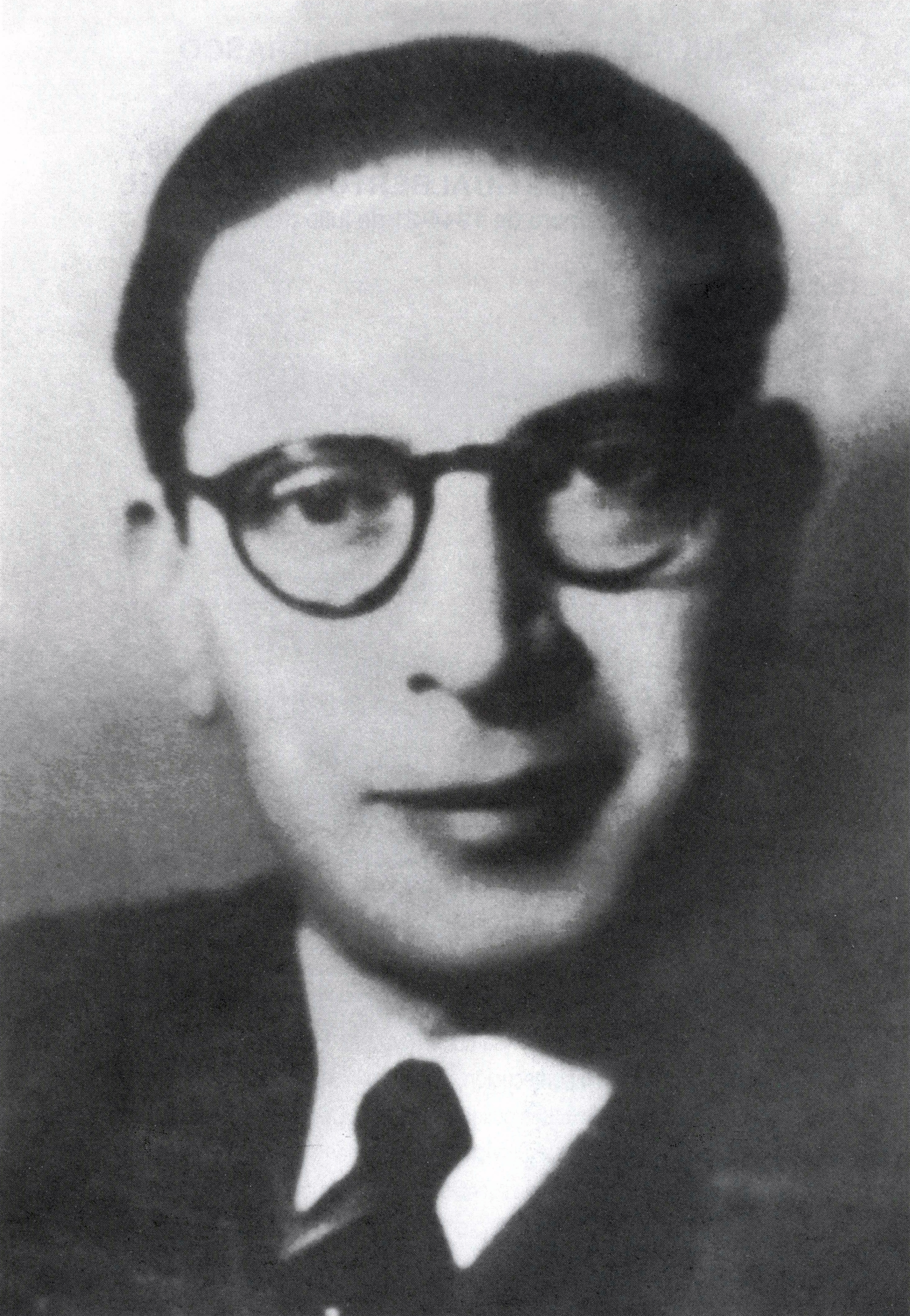

24th Vice President of Bolivia
- In office 28 May 1938 – 24 April 1939
- President: Germán Busch
- Preceded by: José Luis Tejada Sorzano
- Succeeded by: Julián Montellano

Minister of Foreign Affairs and Worship
- In office 16 March 1944 – 8 August 1944
- President: Gualberto Villarroel
- Preceded by: José Tamayo Solares
- Succeeded by: Víctor Andrade Uzquiano
- In office 13 July 1937 – 14 December 1937
- President: Germán Busch
- Preceded by: Enrique Finot
- Succeeded by: Eduardo Díez de Medina
- In office 17 May 1936 – 11 November 1936
- President: Germán Busch (De facto); David Toro
- Preceded by: Luis Fernando Guachalla
- Succeeded by: Enrique Finot

Minister of War and Colonization
- In office 12 April 1935 – 6 September 1935
- President: José Luis Tejada Sorzano
- Preceded by: Juan María Zalles
- Succeeded by: Bernardo Navajas Trigo

Minister of Instruction and Agriculture
- In office 1 December 1934 – 12 April 1935
- President: José Luis Tejada Sorzano
- Preceded by: Juan Manuel Sainz
- Succeeded by: Waldo Belmontes Pool

Personal details
- Born: 15 April 1902 Tupiza, Bolivia
- Died: 16 October 1957 (aged 55) Buenos Aires, Argentina
- Party: Nationalist; United Socialist

Enrique Baldivieso Aparicio (1902–1957) served as the 24th vice president of Bolivia from 1938 to 1939, during the presidency of Germán Busch. He was elected to the post for a four-year term by the National Convention of 1938, which was then serving as Bolivia's unicameral legislature. He was born in Tupiza.

Political offices
Preceded by Juan Manuel Sainz	Minister of Instruction and Agriculture; 1934–1935	Succeeded by Waldo Belmontes Pool
Preceded by Juan Manuel Sainz	Minister of War and Colonization; 1935	Succeeded by Bernardo Navajas Trigo
Preceded by Luis Fernando Guachalla	Minister of Foreign Affairs and Worship; 1936	Succeeded by Óscar Moscoso Gutiérrez
Preceded by Enrique Finot	Minister of Foreign Affairs and Worship; 1937	Succeeded by Eduardo Díez de Medina
Preceded by José Luis Tejada Sorzano	Vice President of Bolivia; 1938–1939	Succeeded by Julián Montellano
Preceded by José Tamayo Solares	Minister of Foreign Affairs and Worship; 1944	Succeeded by Víctor Andrade Uzquiano
