= Ministry of Public Works, Services, and Housing (Bolivia) =

Bolivia government ministry

- Ministerio de Obras Públicas, Servicios y Vivienda

Agency overview
- Formed: February 21, 2006
- Preceding agency: Ministry of Services and Public Works
- Type: Ministry
- Website: www.oopp.gob.bo

The Ministry of Public Works, Services, and Housing (Spanish: Ministerio de Obras Públicas, Servicios y Vivienda) of Bolivia is a ministry responsible for planning telecommunications, transportation, and housing. It was created on 21 February 2006 through law 3351 to replace the Ministry of Services and Public Works.
