= Cabinet of Bolivia =

Advisory body to the President of Bolivia

- Current: Cabinet of Rodrigo Paz

Agency overview
- Type: Advisory body
- Headquarters: La Paz, Bolivia
- Employees: 18 members: 1 vice president; 17 government ministers
- Agency executive: Rodrigo Paz, President of Bolivia

Council of Ministers of Bolivia, or Cabinet of Bolivia, is part of the executive branch of the Bolivian government, consisting of the heads of the variable number of government ministries. The Council of Ministers are ministers of state and conduct the day-to-day business of public administration within Bolivia. The President of Bolivia may freely reorganize the executive branch, with the most recent comprehensive reorganization occurring in February 2009. Since then, the Ministry for the Legal Defense of the State has become the independent office of Solicitor General, and the Ministry of Communication has been created.

== Resources ==
- Ministry of Foreign Relations
- Ministry of Government
- Ministry of the Presidency
- Ministry of Defense
- Ministry of Education
- Ministry Hacienda
- Ministry of Planification
