= Cabinet of José Luis Tejada Sorzano =

Bolivian presidential administration and ministerial cabinet from 1934 to 1936

Tejada Sorzano cabinet
- 94th–96th Cabinet of the Republic of Bolivia
- 1934–1936
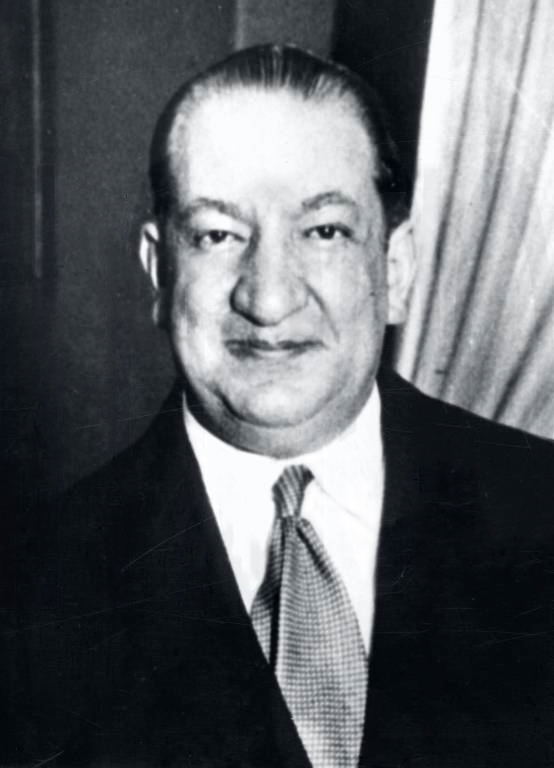
- Date formed: 29 November 1934
- Date dissolved: 17 May 1936

People and organisations
- President: José Luis Tejada Sorzano
- Vice President: Vacant
- No. of ministers: 7 (on 17 May 1936)
- Total no. of members: 20 (incl. former members)
- Member parties: Liberal Party; Socialist Republican Party; Nationalist Party; Genuine Republican Party
- Status in legislature: Minority government

History
- Legislature term: 1933–1936
- Predecessor: Cabinet of Daniel Salamanca
- Successor: Cabinet of David Toro

The Cabinet of José Luis Tejada Sorzano was composed of three cabinets which constituted the 94th–96th national cabinets of the Republic of Bolivia. It was led by President José Luis Tejada Sorzano, a Liberal, and was in office from 29 November 1934 to 17 May 1936.

The cabinet was formed after the armed forces ousted President Daniel Salamanca in a coup d'état and allowed his vice president, José Luis Tejada Sorzano, to assume office. It was dissolved when Tejada Sorzano was himself deposed in another coup d'état. It was the last cabinet presided over by a Liberal president.

== Cabinet Ministers ==
Cabinet of Bolivia Presidency of José Luis Tejada Sorzano, 1934–1936
Office	Minister	Party	Prof.	Term	Days	N.C	P.C
President	José Luis Tejada Sorzano	PL	Law.	28 November 1934 – 1 December 1934	3	–	–
President	José Luis Tejada Sorzano	PL	Law.	1 December 1934 – 17 May 1936	533	–	–
Vice President	Office vacant throughout presidency					–	–
Minister of Foreign Affairs and Worship (Chancellor)	David Alvéstegui Laredo	Ind.	Law.	22 March 1934 – 5 April 1935	379	92 (Note: Originally a member of the 92nd national cabinet of Bolivia.)	5 (Note: Originally a member of the 5th Cabinet of Daniel Salamanca.)
Minister of Foreign Affairs and Worship (Chancellor)	David Alvéstegui Laredo	Ind.	Law.	22 March 1934 – 5 April 1935	379	93	1
Minister of Foreign Affairs and Worship (Chancellor)	Office vacant 5 April 1935 – 12 April 1935				7	94	1
Minister of Foreign Affairs and Worship (Chancellor)	Tomás Manuel Elío	PL	Law.	12 April 1935 – 5 March 1936	328	95	2
Minister of Foreign Affairs and Worship (Chancellor)	Tomás Manuel Elío	PL	Law.	12 April 1935 – 5 March 1936	328	96	3
Minister of Foreign Affairs and Worship (Chancellor)	Luis Fernando Guachalla	PL	Law.	5 March 1936 – 17 May 1936	73	96	3
Minister of Government and Justice	Tomás Manuel Elío	PL	Law.	29 November 1934 – 12 April 1935	134	94	1
Minister of Government and Justice	José Aguirre Espada	–	–	12 April 1935 – 6 September 1935	147	95	2
Minister of Government and Justice	Alfredo Peñaranda	Mil.	Mil.	6 September 1935 – 1 October 1935	25	96	3
Minister of Government and Justice	José Aguirre Espada	–	–	1 October 1935 – 2 May 1936	214	96	3
Minister of Government and Justice	Gabriel Palenque	–	–	2 May 1936 – 17 May 1936	15	96	3
Minister of National Defense	Bautista Saavedra	PRS	Law.	29 November 1934 – 14 December 1934	15	94	1
Minister of National Defense	Gabriel Gosálvez	PRS	Eco.	14 December 1934 – 5 August 1935	234	94	1
Minister of National Defense	Gabriel Gosálvez	PRS	Eco.	14 December 1934 – 5 August 1935	234	95	2
Minister of National Defense	Luis Añez Rodríguez	Mil.	Mil.	5 August 1935 – 17 May 1936	286	95	2
Minister of National Defense	Luis Añez Rodríguez	Mil.	Mil.	5 August 1935 – 17 May 1936	286	96	3
Minister of Development and Communications	José Aguirre Espada	–	–	29 November 1934 – 12 April 1935	134	94	1
Minister of Development and Communications	Carlos Calvo Calbimontes	–	–	12 April 1935 – 22 May 1935	40	95	2
Minister of Development and Communications	Manuel Carrasco Jimenez (Note: Acting Foreign Minister: 20 May – 6 September 1935.)	PL	Law.	22 May 1935 – 6 September 1935	107	95	2
Minister of Development and Communications	José Aguirre Espada	–	–	6 September 1935 – 1 October 1935	25	96	3
Minister of Development and Communications	Antenor Ichazo	Mil.	Mil.	1 October 1935 – 17 May 1936	229	96	3
Minister of Finance and Industry	Carlos Víctor Aramayo (Note: Acting Foreign Minister: 5–12 April 1935.)	PRG	Bus.	29 November 1934 – 12 April 1935	134	94	1
Minister of Finance and Industry	Office vacant 12 April 1935 – 22 May 1935				40	95	2
Minister of Finance and Industry	Federico Gutiérrez Granier	PL	Law.	22 May 1935 – 6 September 1935	107	95	2
Minister of Finance and Industry	Héctor Ormachea Zalles	–	Law.	6 September 1935 – 17 May 1936	254	96	3
Minister of Instruction and Agriculture	Enrique Baldivieso	PN	Law.	29 November 1934 – 12 April 1935	134	94	1
Minister of Instruction and Agriculture	Waldo Belmonte Pool	PRS	Law.	12 April 1935 – 6 September 1935	147	95	2
Minister of Instruction and Agriculture	Alfredo Peñaranda (Note: Acting/Interim?)	Mil.	Mil.	5 August 1935 – 6 September 1935	32	95	2
Minister of Instruction and Agriculture	José Maria Gutiérrez (Note: Acting Foreign Minister: 6 September 1935 – 18 January 1936.)	PL	Law.	6 September 1935 – 17 May 1936	254	96	3
Minister of War and Colonization	Juan María Zalles	PL	Law.	29 November 1934 – 12 April 1935	134	94	1
Minister of War and Colonization	Enrique Baldivieso	PN	Law.	12 April 1935 – 6 September 1935	147	95	2
Minister of War and Colonization	Bernardo Navajas Trigo	PL	Law.	6 September 1935 – 17 May 1936	254	96	3

== Composition ==
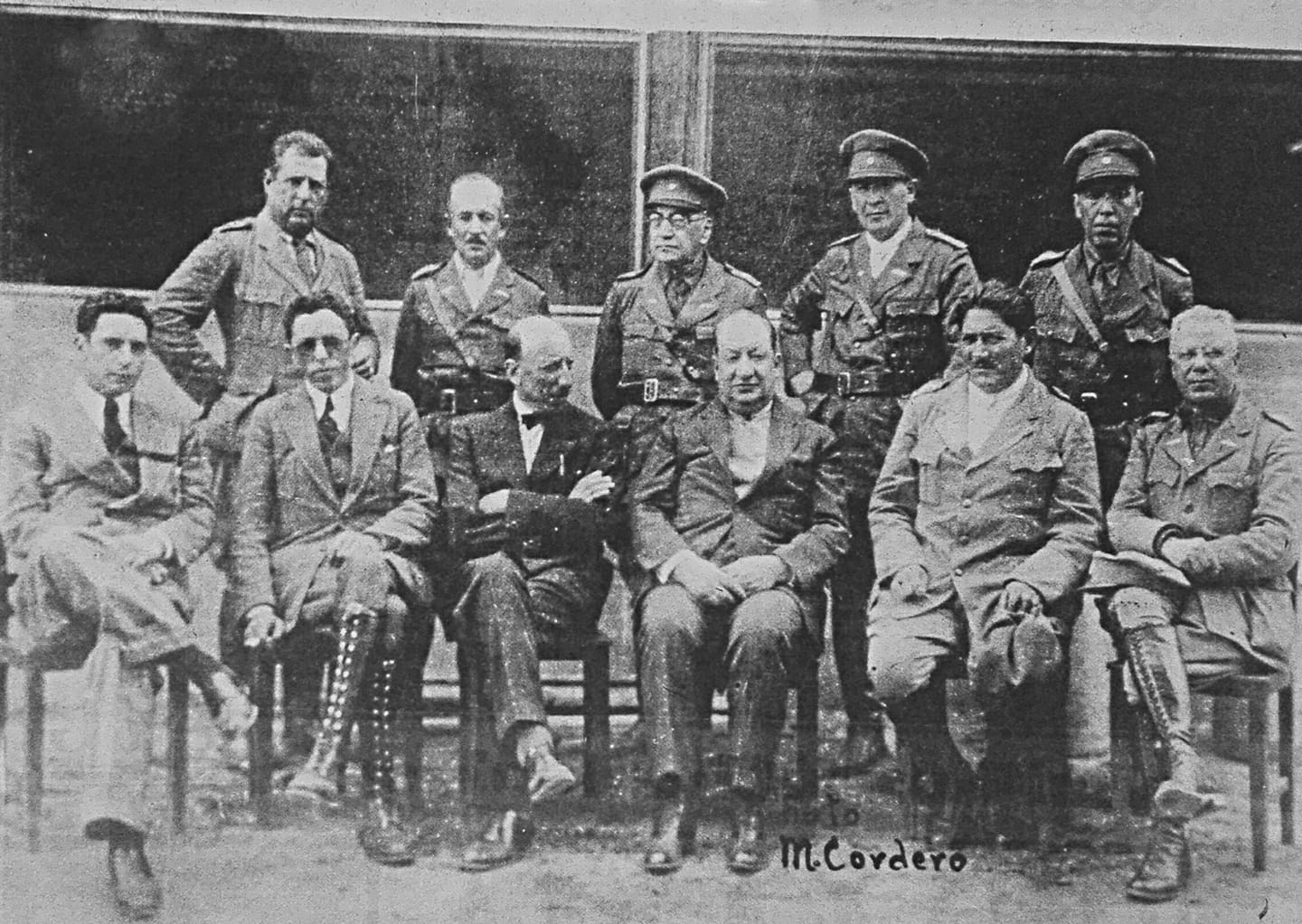
President Tejada Sorzano in the Chaco with cabinet ministers and military officers

=== First cabinet ===
On 27 November 1934, President Daniel Salamanca travelled to the military headquarters in Villamontes in order to personally reorganize the high command of the armed forces. Considering this, Vice President José Luis Tejada Sorzano assumed office as acting president in Salamanca's absence on 28 November. By that point, the military had already ousted Salamanca in a coup d'état the day prior. On 29 November, Salamanca's cabinet submitted its resignation and Tejada Sorzano, still acting president, formed a new one. Tejada Sorzano formally assumed office as president on 1 December when a military commission arrived to deliver Salamanca's official resignation.

The only holdover from the previous administration was Foreign Minister David Alvéstegui Laredo who had been serving since 22 March. When Alvéstegui suddenly resigned on 5 April 1935, the position remained vacant though Carlos Víctor Aramayo, a prominent tin magnate and Minister of Finance, did hold the office as acting minister for a few days. Former President Bautista Saavedra was briefly Minister of National Defense for 14 days after which he was replaced by Gabriel Gosálvez.

=== Second and third cabinets ===
Tejada Sorzano's second cabinet was formed on 12 April 1935. The vacancy in the Foreign Ministry was filled by Minister of Government and Justice Tomás Manuel Elío. That ministry was in turn filled by José Aguirre Espada.

Tejada Sorzano's third cabinet was formed on 6 September 1935. It was under this government that Tejada Sorzano was overthrown in a coup d'état in May 1936. Many ministers who served in his administration would support his ouster and join the government of his successor, David Toro. These included: Enrique Baldivieso, Gabriel Gosálvez, Antenor Ichazo, Luis Añez Rodríguez, and Alfredo Peñaranda.

== Gallery ==
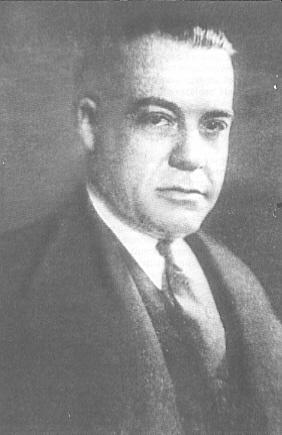
David Alvéstegui Laredo – Minister of Foreign Affairs

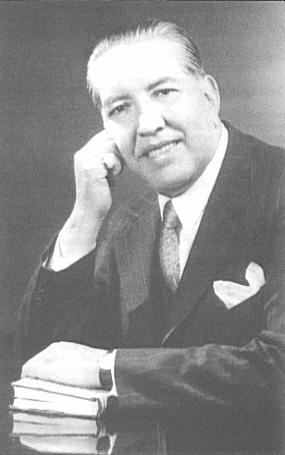
Tomás Manuel Elío – Minister of Foreign Affairs and Minister of Government

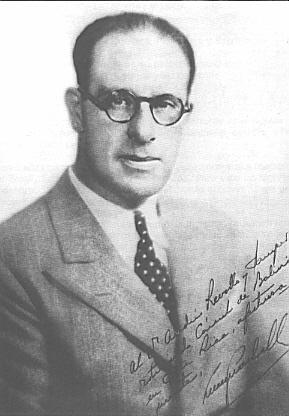
Luis Fernando Guachalla – Minister of Foreign Affairs

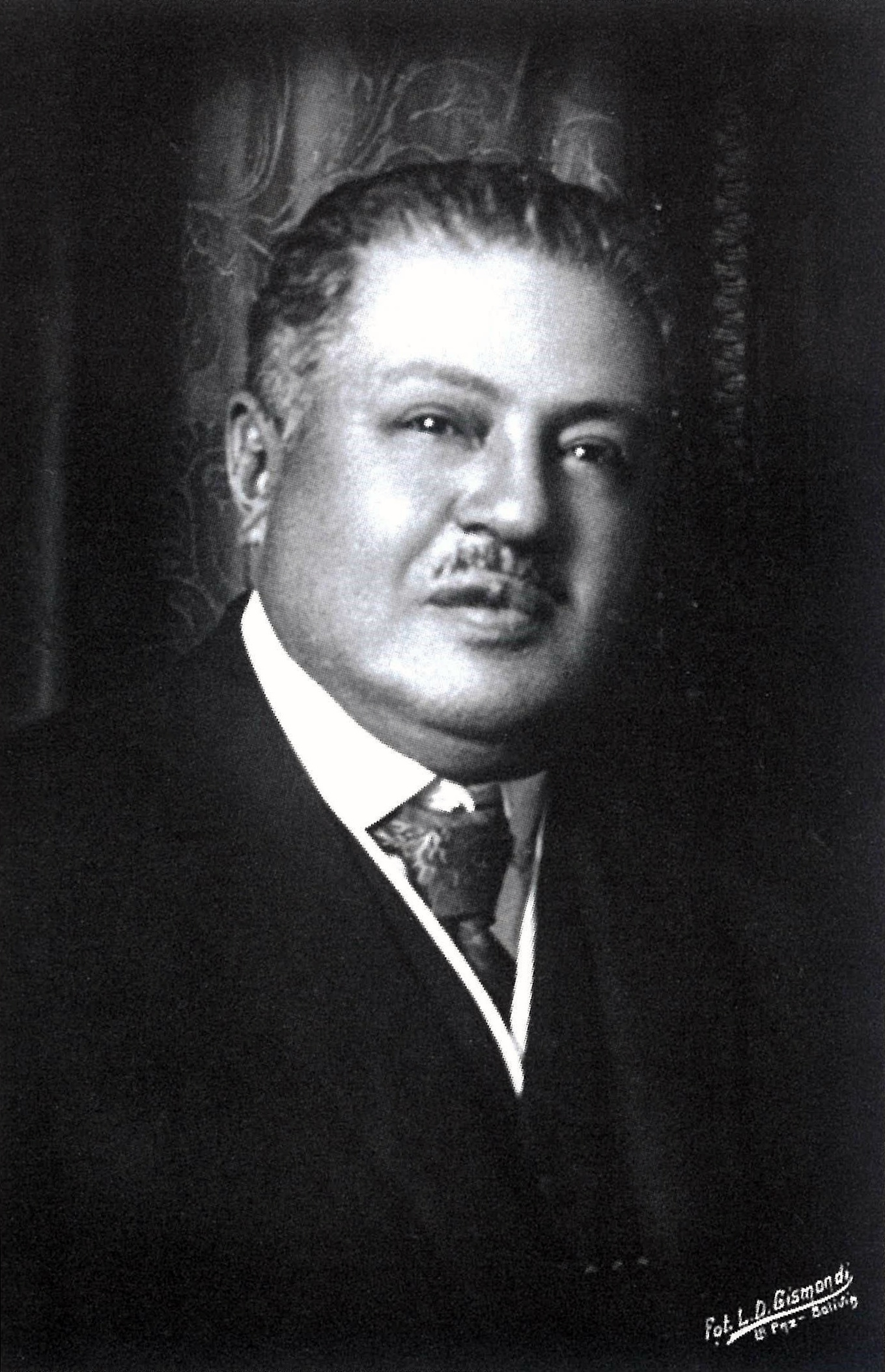
Bautista Saavedra – Minister of National Defense

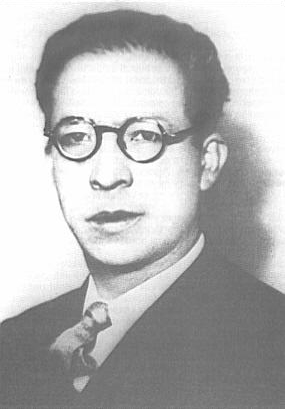
Gabriel Gosálvez – Minister of National Defense

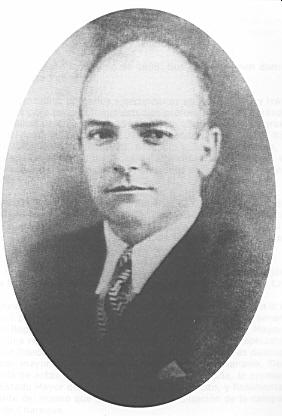
Luis Añez Rodríguez – Minister of National Defense

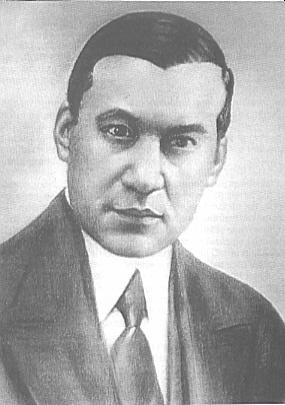
Manuel Carrasco Jimenez – Minister of Development

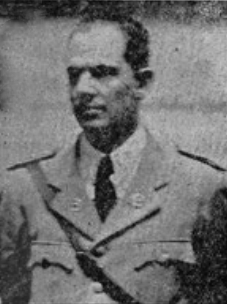
Antenor Ichazo – Minister of Development

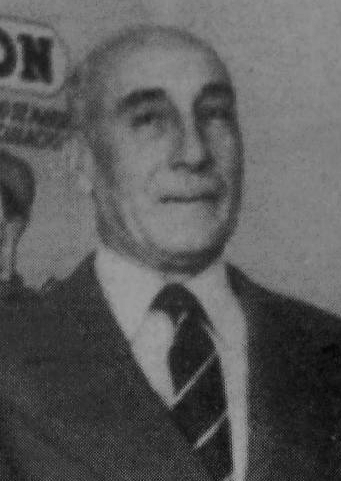
Carlos Víctor Aramayo – Minister of Finance

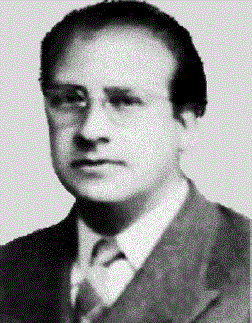
Héctor Ormachea Zalles – Minister of Finance

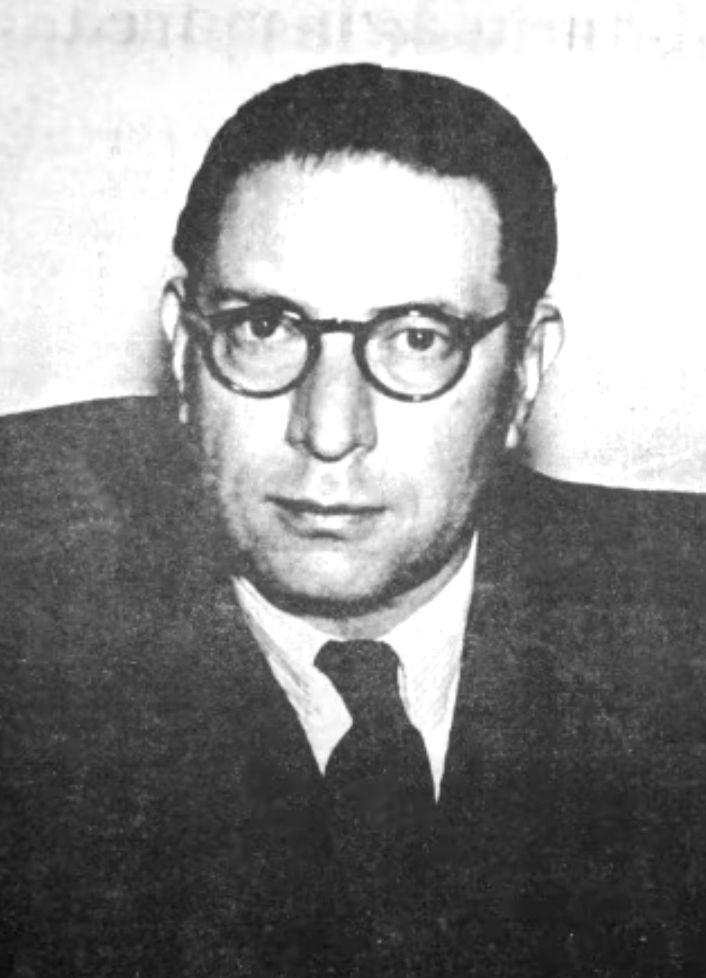
Enrique Baldivieso – Minister of Instruction and Minister of War

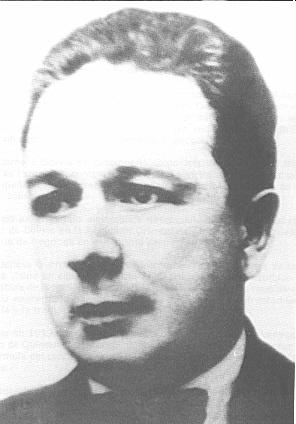
Waldo Belmonte Pool – Minister of Instruction

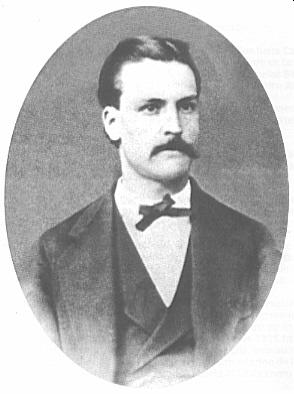
José Maria Gutiérrez Lea Plaza – Minister of Instruction

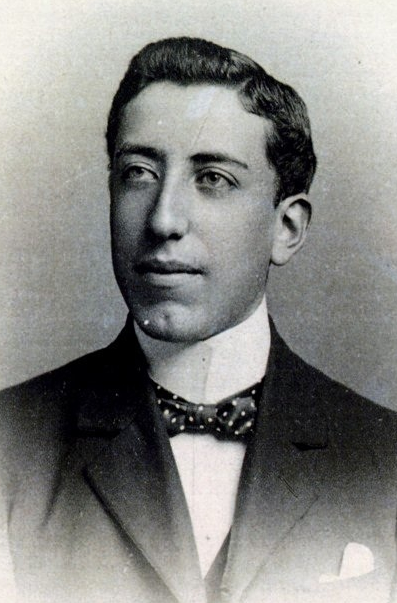
Juan María Zalles – Minister of War

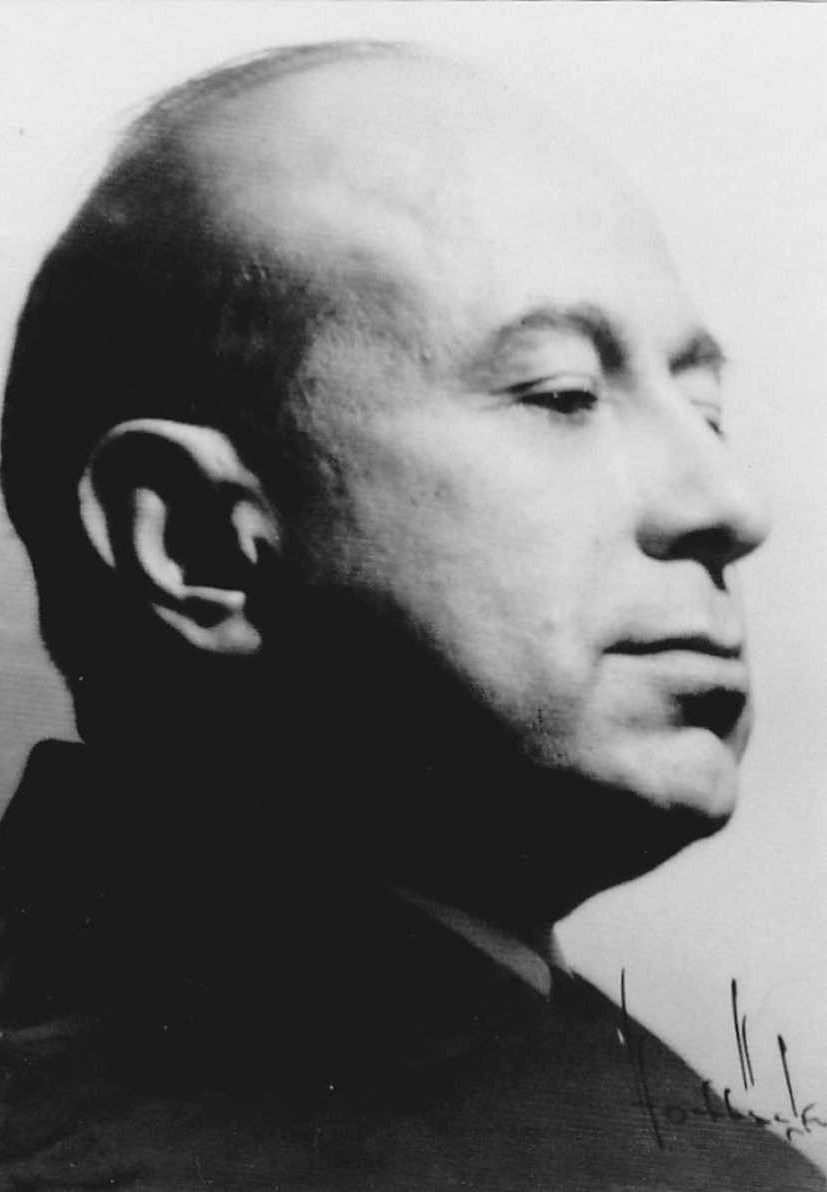
Bernardo Navajas Trigo – Minister of War

== Bibliography ==
- Gisbert, Carlos D. Mesa (2003). Presidentes de Bolivia: entre urnas y fusiles : el poder ejecutivo, los ministros de estado (in Spanish). Editorial Gisbert. pp. 340–343.
