= Radical Party (Bolivia) =

The Radical Party (Spanish: Partido Radical, PR) was founded in 1913, following a split in the Liberal Party in Bolivia.

The "Radical Generation" of the Liberal Party was made up of progressive young liberals. They were a kind of liberal left who hoped that through their criticisms the ruling Party could be persuaded to rectify its errors. The history of the Radical Party is, above all, the history of the newspaper campaigns inspired by Franz Tamayo Solares. In 1913 the workers engaged in bitter opposition to the liberal Federación Obrera de La Paz joined up with these young Radical politicians in rebellion against the President Ismael Montes Gamboa. This alliance resulted in the formation of the Radical Party, inspired by Franz Tamayo Solares, Felipe Segundo Guzmán and Tomás Manuel Elio.

In the Congressional election campaign of May 1916 the Radical Party proposed Tomás Manuel Elio and Franz Tamayo Solares as its candidates.

The Radicals were persistent in their efforts to portray themselves as the defenders of the workers. Felipe Segundo Guzmán claimed that the Party bears a resemblance to the socialist movement, sharing ideas aimed at protecting labour and defending it against the tyranny of capitalism.

Even at its peak the Radicals was never a major electoral force in the country. Lacking a strong popular base, political imagination and prominent personalities, the Partido Radical was incapable of really threatening Liberal predominance. The aggressive personality of Franz Tamayo, who originally entered parliament as a Liberal, was the Radical's only asset. The vacillations and its internal contradictions contributed to the eventual disappearance of the Radical Party. In their search for political ways of improving their socio-economic situation the workers turned not only to the Radicals but also to the new Republican Party, which had also broken away from the Liberals.

After the revolution of 1920 Radicals split into three factions. Franz Tamayo Solares and his followers dissolved into the Republican Party. Tomás Manuel Elio and his followers returned to the Liberal Party. A minor group continuing as the Radical Party. For the 1940 general elections Radicals allied with the conservative Concordance and elected the one deputy of the new National Congress (Claudio Zuazo).

After the revolution of 1943 the Radical Party disappeared.
