= Felipe Segundo Guzmán =

President of Bolivia from 1925 to 1926

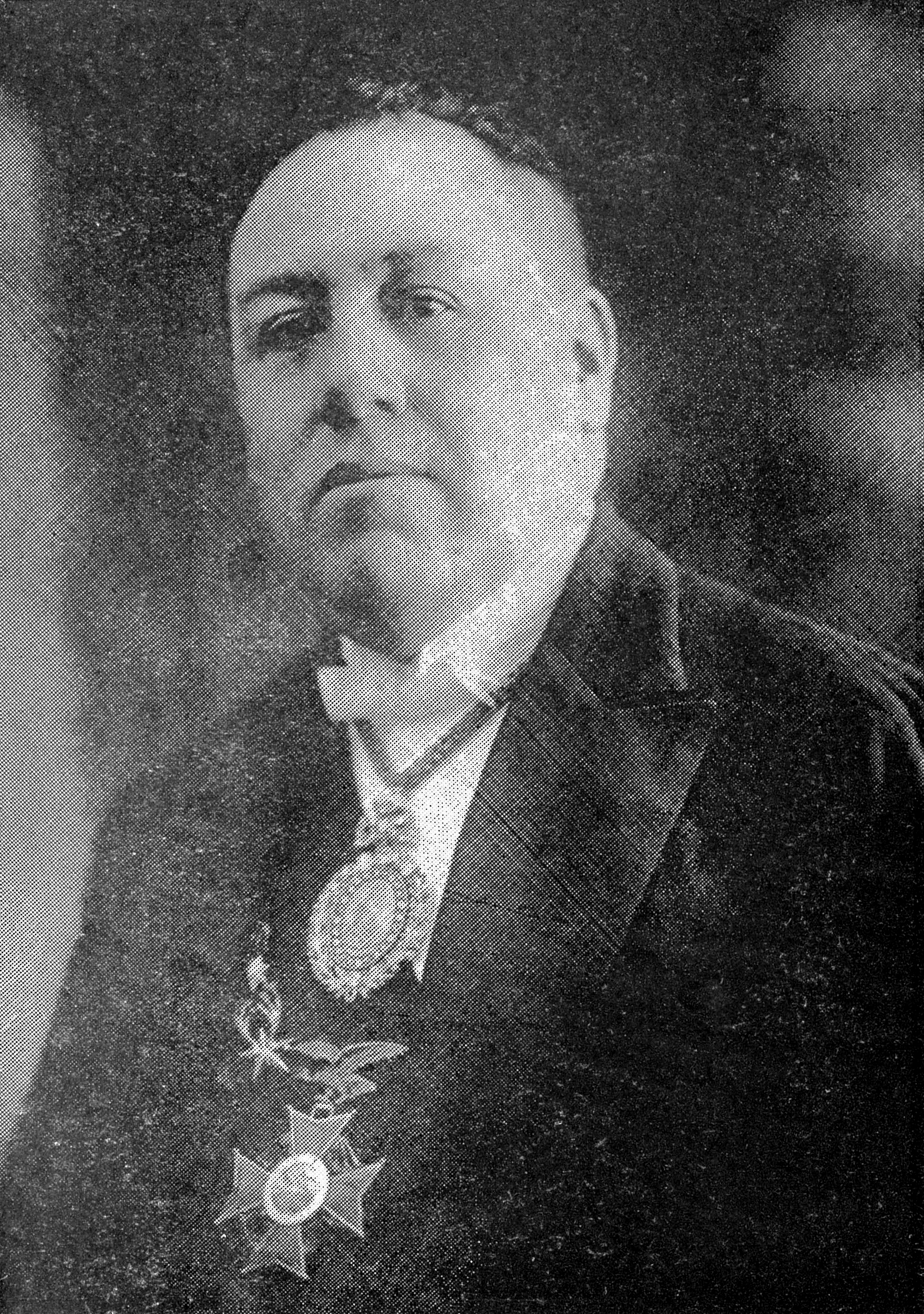
- Official portrait, c. 1925

30th President of Bolivia
- Provisional
- In office 3 September 1925 – 10 January 1926
- Vice President: Vacant
- Preceded by: Bautista Saavedra
- Succeeded by: Hernando Siles
Ministerial offices
Minister of War and Colonization
In office 12 November 1927 – 26 January 1928
President	Hernando Siles
Preceded by	Aurelio Meleán
Succeeded by	Aurelio Arauz
Minister of Government and Justice
In office 14 March 1927 – 12 November 1927
President	Hernando Siles
Preceded by	Enrique Velasco
Succeeded by	J. Minor Gainsborg
Minister of Instruction and Agriculture
In office 27 June 1922 – 10 March 1923
President	Bautista Saavedra
Preceded by	Hernando Siles
Succeeded by	Félix del Grando

Personal details
- Born: Felipe Segundo Guzmán; 17 January 1879 La Paz, Bolivia
- Died: 16 June 1932 (aged 53) La Paz, Bolivia
- Party: Republican
- Occupation: Academic; politician

Felipe Segundo Guzmán (17 January 1879 – 16 June 1932) was a Bolivian academic and politician who served as the 30th president of Bolivia from 1925 to 1926.

Born in La Paz, Guzmán began his career as a school teacher and university professor. He taught at the normal school of the Altiplano, where he focused on the linguistic Hispanicization of the region's indigenous Aymara and Quechua inhabitants. He studied pedagogy in Europe, and later became a professor of political economics at the Higher University of San Andrés and rector of the Technical University of Oruro.

A member of the Republican Party, Guzmán represented La Paz in the Chamber of Deputies and served as minister of instruction under Bautista Saavedra from 1922 to 1923. He was later elected to the Senate and was made president of the upper chamber. In that role and following the annulment of the May 1925 presidential election, Guzmán succeeded Saavedra as provisional president after the latter's term expired before a fresh election could be held. He oversaw the December re-do election, in which Hernando Siles won the presidency.

Siles appointed Guzmán minister of government in 1927 and minister of war from 1927 to 1928. Following the fall of Siles in 1930, Guzmán retired from politics. He died in La Paz in 1932, aged fifty-three.

== Notes ==
Political offices
Preceded by Hernando Siles Reyes	Minister of Instruction and Agriculture; 1922–1923	Succeeded by Félix del Grando
Preceded by Enrique Velasco y Galvarro	Minister of Government and Justice; 1927	Succeeded by J. Minor Gainsborg
Preceded by Bautista Saavedra	President of Bolivia; Provisional; 1925–1926	Succeeded by Hernando Siles Reyes
Preceded by Aurelio Meleán	Minister of War and Colonization; 1927–1928	Succeeded by Aurelio Arauz
