= 1917 Bolivian presidential election =

Presidential elections were held in Bolivia on 6 May 1917, electing a new President of the Republic and two Vice Presidents.

== Results ==
=== President ===
Candidate	Party	Votes	%
José Gutiérrez Guerra	Liberal Party	73,705	88.10
José María Escalier	Republican Party	9,956	11.90
Total		83,661	100.00
Valid votes		83,661	98.61
Invalid/blank votes		1,179	1.39
Total votes		84,840	100.00
Source: Cáceres

=== First Vice President ===
Candidate	Party	Votes	%
Ismael Vázquez Virreira	Liberal Party	71,921	88.03
Daniel Salamanca Urey	Republican Party	9,784	11.97
Total		81,705	100.00
Source: Cáceres

=== Second Vice President ===
Candidate	Party	Votes	%
José Santos Quinteros	Liberal Party	71,103	89.01
Bautista Saavedra	Republican Party	8,782	10.99
Total		79,885	100.00
Source: Cáceres
