= December 1925 Bolivian general election =

- 1 December 1925
- Presidential election
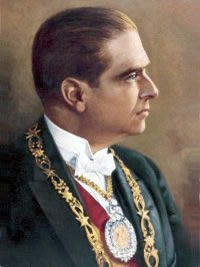

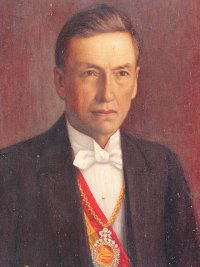
| Candidate | Hernando Siles | Daniel Salamanca |
| Party | PR | PRG |
| Popular vote | 70,612 | 1,937 |
| Percentage | 97.33% | 2.67% |
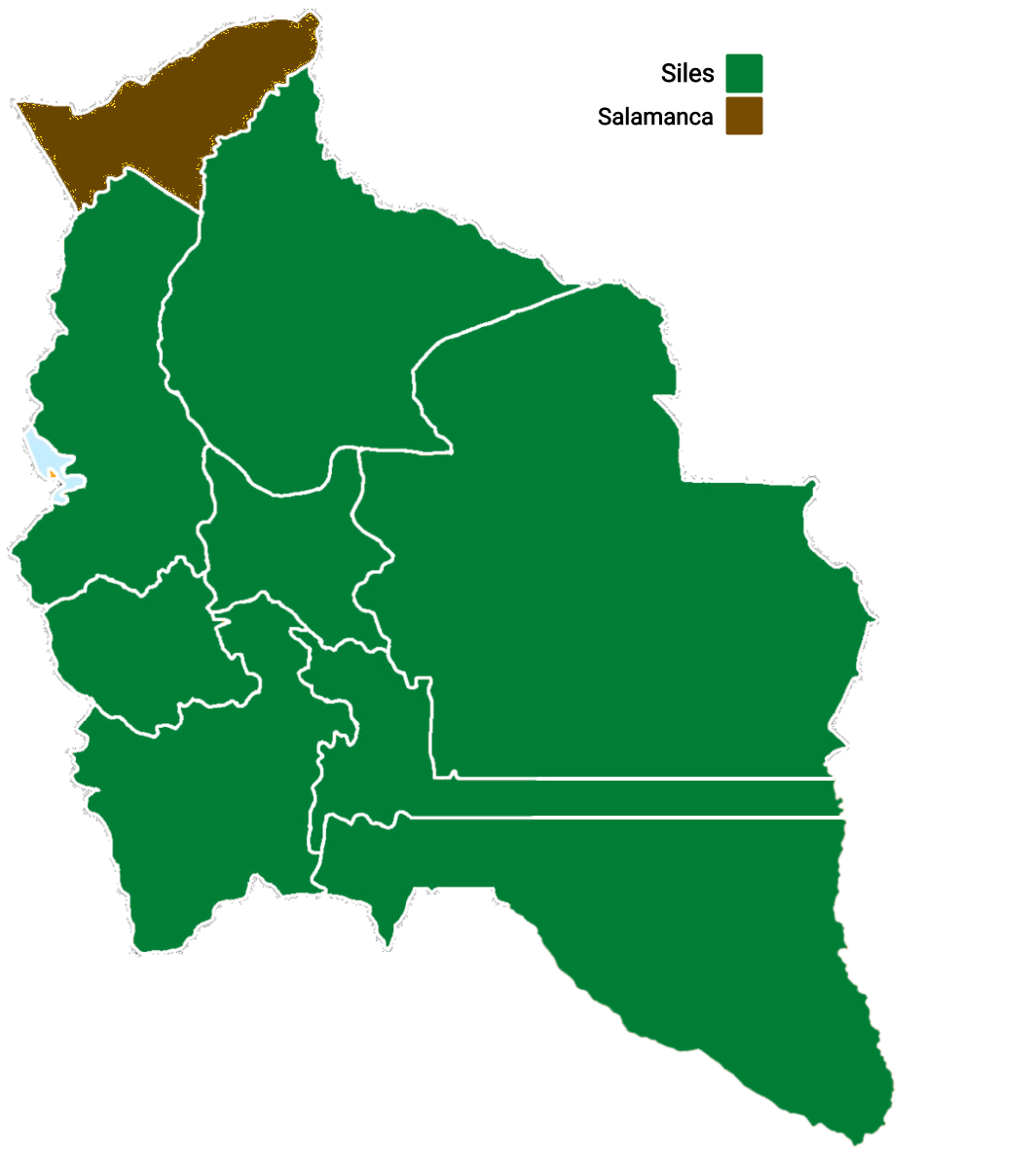
President before election
Bautista Saavedra
PR
Elected President
Hernando Siles
PR

General elections were held in Bolivia on 1 December 1925, electing a new President of the Republic.

== Results ==
=== President ===
| Candidate | Party | Votes | % |
|---|---|---|---|
| Hernando Siles | Republican | 70,612 | 97.33 |
| Daniel Salamanca Urey | Genuine Republican | 1,937 | 2.67 |
| Total | | 72,549 | 100.00 |
Source: Mesa
