= Sara Ugarte =

Bolivian poet (1866-1925)

Sara Ugarte de Salamanca
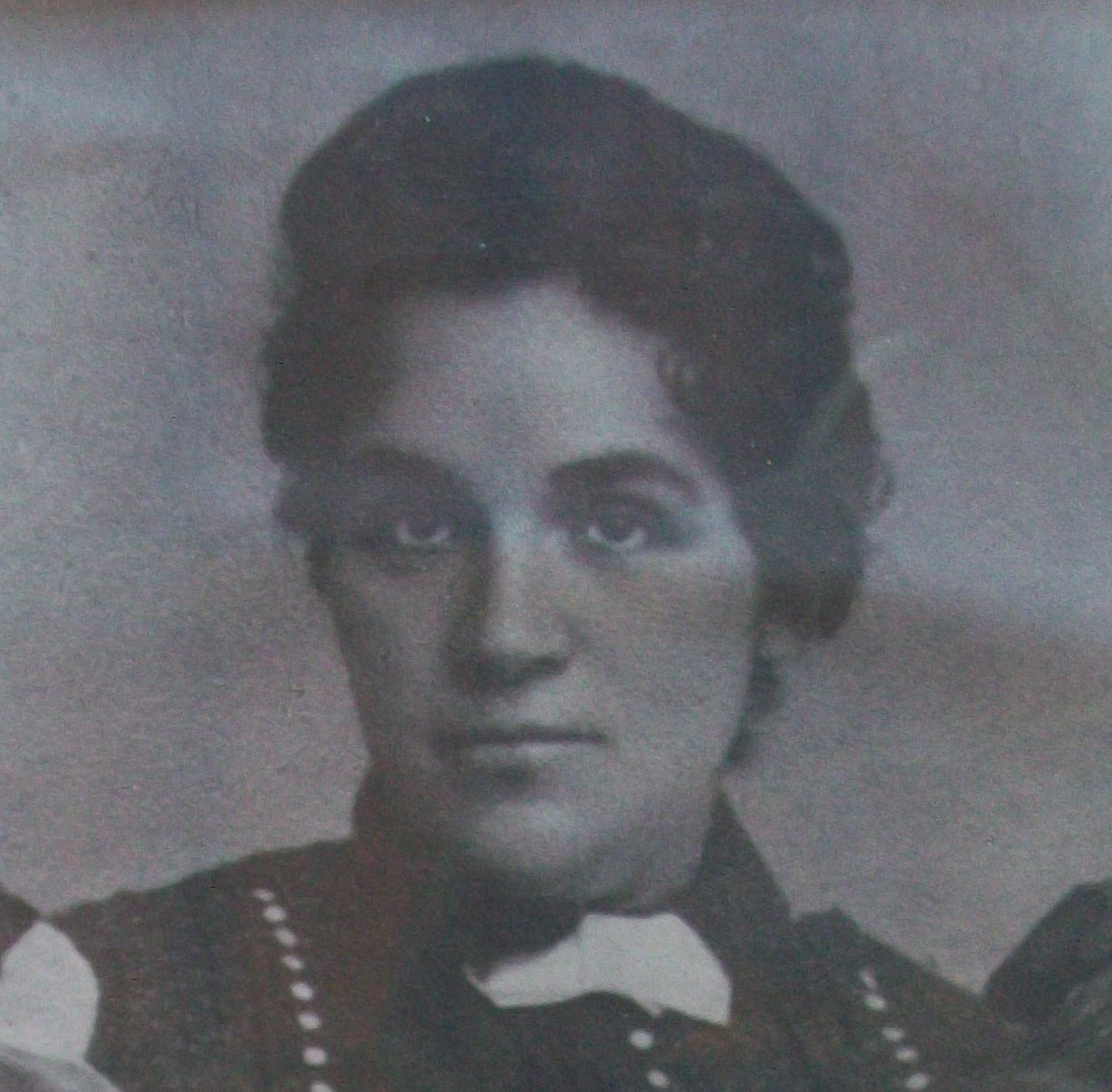
- Born: 1866; Cochabamba, Bolivia
- Died: 1925 (aged 58–59); Cochabamba, Bolivia

Sara Ugarte de Salamanca (1866-1925) was a Bolivian poet and wife of Daniel Salamanca Urey. She was from Cochabamba. She campaigned to have a monument built to the local heroines who had fought trained soldiers in 1812.

== Life ==
She was born in 1866 in Cochabamba. Her husband, Daniel Salamanca Urey, was also born in that city.

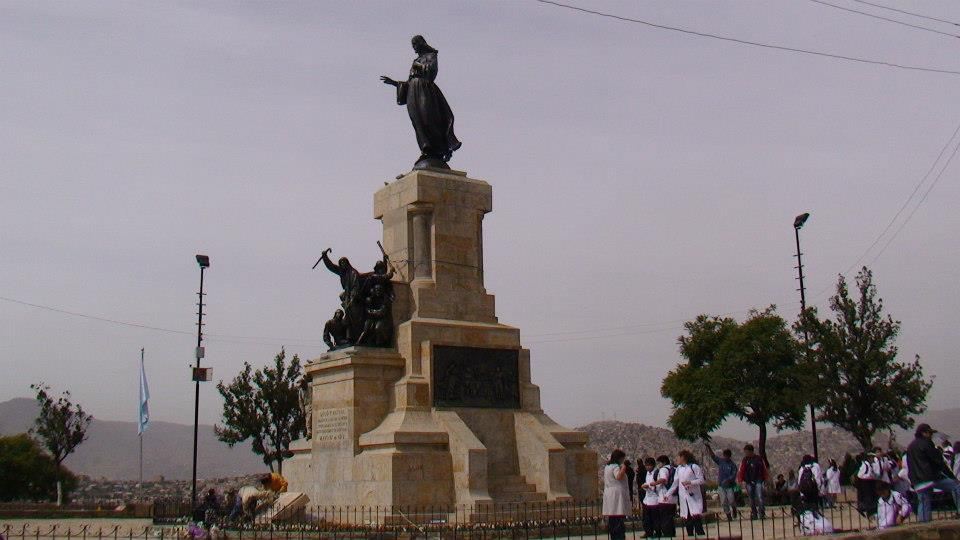
"Monumento a las Heroínas de la Coronilla" on the hill of San Sebastián. Cochabamba, Bolivia.

She campaigned to have a monument built to celebrate local heroes of the Bolivian War of Independence at the top of the hill of San Sebastián. Cochabamba, Bolivia. This was where battles were fought on the 27 May 1812. The women had resisted the forces of General Jose Manuel de Goyeneche. Ugarte founded and led the "27 de Mayo" Patriotic Society (precursor of the current Civic Women's Committee7), and fought to create a monument to the Heroines of the Crown. In 1926, a year after Ugarte's death, President Hernando Siles agreed that the monument could be built on the top of San Sebastián Hill. The celebrations lasted three days and included the inauguration of the 25 de Mayo market.
