= 1920 Bolivian coup d'état =

Bloodless takeover of power in Bolivia on July 12, 1920

1920 Bolivian coup d'état was a bloodless takeover of power in Bolivia by the Republican party on July 12, 1920 which overthrew the previously ruling government of the Liberal Party and brought Bautista Saavedra to power as President from 1920 until 1925.

Republicans were less united by a single ideology than a wide alliance of former Liberals and some Conservative elites who usually had some personal conflicts with the ruling Liberals and wanted to gain power for themselves. Soon after the coup, Republicans split into two new factions grouped around Bautista Saavedra and Daniel Salamanca, who established the Genuine Republican Party.

Saavedra legalized the right to strike and introduced government arbitration in labour disputes. In 1922 he caused a general strike after banning night taxis. The strikers won and taxi services were resumed and railroad federation was recognized as representative of railroad workers. This did not mean the end of violence. In 1923 a strike by miners in Uncia was repressed by force. A native uprising in the Altiplano region led by Jesus de Machacha was also suppressed in the same year. The tin boom came to end in 1925 and economic problems began.

Saavedra picked his successor Hernando Siles, one of the leading Republicans, who was elected President in 1926 and was forced to resign in 1930 after he tried to get elected for the second term. Daniel Salamanca then assumed Presidency with the help of Liberal Party and soon led the country into the disastrous Chaco War.
