= Concordancia =

Concordancia may refer to:

- Concordance (Bolivia), a former political alliance in Bolivia
- Concordancia (Argentina), a former political alliance in Argentina
