= May 1925 Bolivian general election =

General elections were held in Bolivia on 2 May 1925, electing a new President of the Republic. However, the results of the election were annulled.

== Results ==
=== President ===
Candidate	Party	Votes	%
José Gabino Villanueva	Republican Party	45,826	84.76
Daniel Salamanca Urey	PRG–Liberal Party	8,242	15.24
Total		54,068	100.00
Source: Mesa
