= Abel Alarcón =

Bolivian lawyer, poet, and writer (1881–1954)

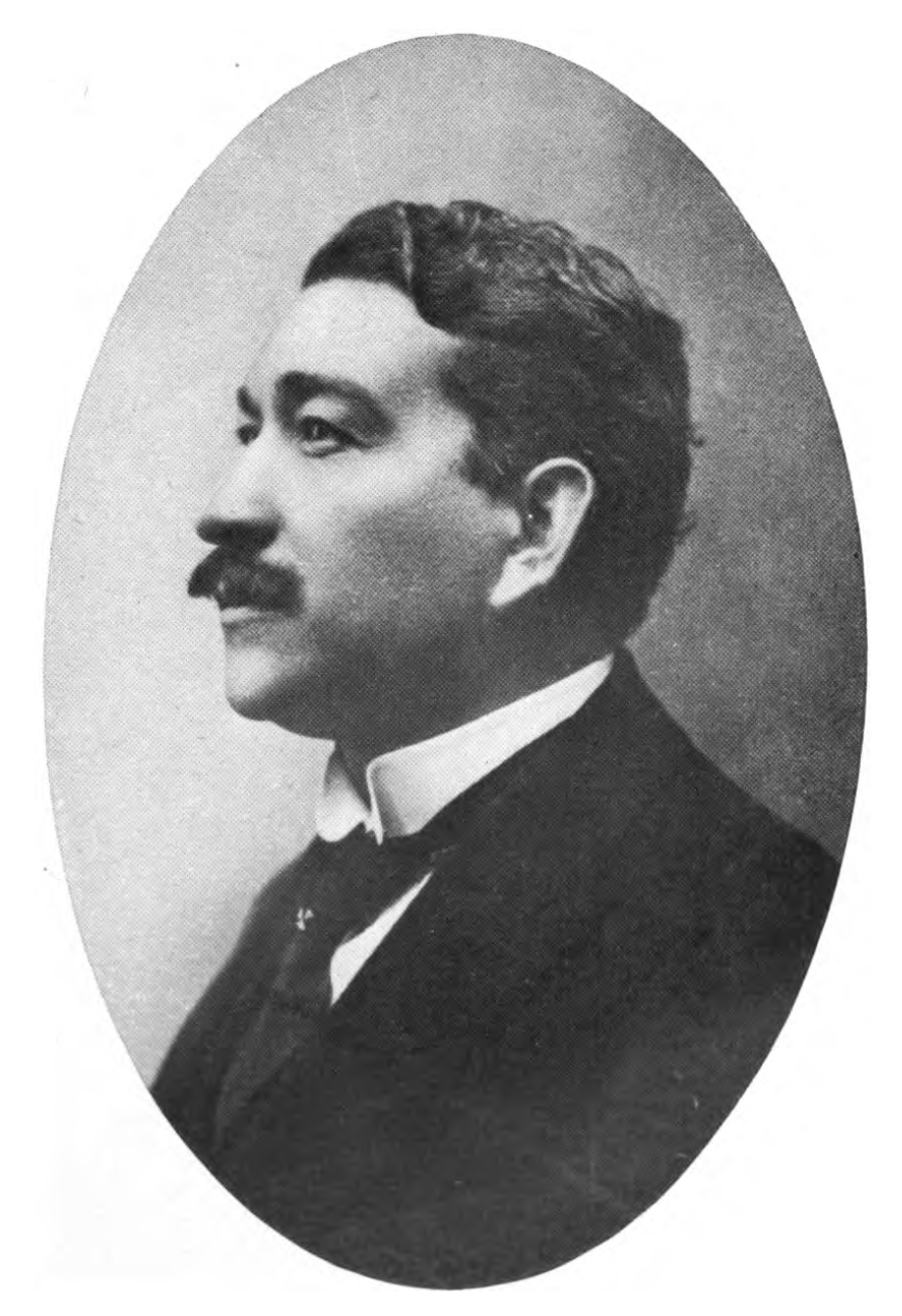
- Portrait published in Relicario, 1919
- Born: Abel Alarcón de la Peña; 10 October 1881; La Paz, Bolivia
- Died: 20 October 1954 (aged 73); Buenos Aires, Argentina
- Education: Higher University of San Andrés (BA, LL.B., DL)
- Occupations: Writer; poet; lawyer; professor
- Political party: Liberal
- Spouse: Antonia Maluschka
- Parent(s): J. Benedicto Alarcón; Clementina de la Peña

Signature
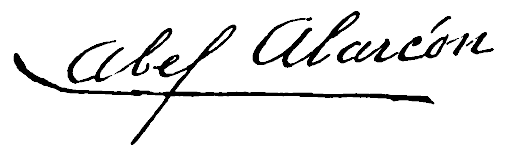

Abel Alarcón de la Peña (10 October 1881 – 20 October 1954) was a Bolivian lawyer, poet, and writer. His works delved into a variety of genres, including historical works and translations, political essays, as well as poetry and fiction.

== Early life ==
Abel Alarcón was born on 10 October 1881 in La Paz to J. Benedicto Alarcón, dean of the Superior Court of Justice of La Paz, and Clementina de la Peña. He was educated at the La Paz Seminary before later attending the Higher University of San Andrés where he received a Bachelor of Arts in 1898 and Bachelor of Law and Political Science in 1900, later graduating with a licenciate in Law and Political Science in 1902 and as a Doctor of Laws in 1903.

== Career ==
Alarcón began his career in 1903 when he became an editor of the proceedings of the National Senate. A member of the Liberal Party, from 1904 he was the director of the Public Library of La Paz. During this time, in 1905, Alarcón became a member of the Palabras Libres literary cenacle which published a tri-weekly column in the morning newspaper El Diario. He focused his publications on the study of the Spanish language and on the territorial dispute between Bolivia and Paraguay over the Chaco Boreal. In addition, he joined with fellow Liberal writer José Luis Tejada Sorzano to cover new avant-garde literary and artistic works from abroad.

In 1906, Alarcón was appointed director of Archives in the Ministry of Foreign Affairs, spending two years in that position after which he was promoted as head of the Consular Section until 1913. From June 1916 to August 1917, he was the secretary general of the Higher University of San Andrés. He resigned in order become assistant secretary of Public Instruction under Minister of Instruction Claudio Sanjinés during the presidency of José Gutiérrez Guerra.

From the 1920s to the mid-1930s, Alarcón travelled abroad, working as a professor at the Universities in Santiago (1920–1922), the United States (1923–1925), and Austria (1932–1934). In 1935, he returned to Bolivia. He served as secretary of the Bolivian Academy of Language until his death in 1954.

== Publications ==
- Alarcón, Abel (1904). Pupilas y cabelleras (in Spanish). La Paz: Imp. y litografía artística.
- —————— (1905). Insomnio (in Spanish). Impr. Velarde.
- —————— (1906). De mi tierra y de mi alma (in Spanish). La Paz: Imp. Velarde.
- —————— (1909). El Imperio del Sol: Canto a la confraternidad de Hispano-América y homenaje al pueblo de la Paz en el centenario de la independencia (in Spanish). Santiago: Impr. La Ilustración.
- —————— (1919). Relicario (in Spanish). La Paz: González y Medina.
- —————— (1926). California la bella (in Spanish). Madrid: Renacimiento.
- —————— (1929). En la corte de Yahuar-huacac: novela original incaica (in Spanish). Valparaíso: Editorial Nascimento.
- —————— (1935). Érase una vez: historia novelada de la Villa Imperial de Potosí (in Spanish). Editorial Nascimento.
- —————— (1936). Cuentos del viejo Alto Perú (in Spanish). Editorial Arno.
- —————— (1948). A los genios del Siglo de Oro (in Spanish). Centenario.
