= Franz Tamayo =

Bolivian intellectual, writer, and politician

Franz Tamayo Solares
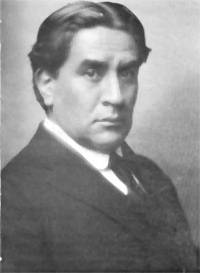
- Born: February 28, 1879; La Paz, Bolivia
- Died: July 29, 1956 (aged 77)
- Occupations: Intellectual, writer, politician
- Known for: Oratory, racial concepts, political influence
- Notable work: Educational treatises, poetry, philosophy

Franz Tamayo Solares (28 February 1879 in La Paz – 29 July 1956) was a Bolivian intellectual, writer, and politician. The Franz Tamayo Province is named after him. He was renowned for his oratory. A prominent Bolivian poet and philosopher, he wrote a number of educational treatises and also practiced law, journalism, and diplomacy. Tamayo was of Mestizo background; he had both Aymara and Spanish ancestry.

== Career and influence ==
Tamayo's racial concepts were and continue to be very influential in Bolivian thought, life, and culture. He considered Indians (indigenous or originary people) skilled only in the faculties of physical labor, such as agricultural work or military service, but deficient in faculties of the mind that whites (creoles or those of European descent) excelled in. Mestizos (of mixed descent) he considered proficient in both the areas of physical and mental labor and therefore able to function as citizens of the Bolivian Republic, assuming acculturation to European culture. This racialized understanding of the mestizo (or Cholo) and modern citizen would greatly influence and underline Bolivia's politics and national identity after the 1952 revolution.

In politics, Tamayo originally supported the Liberal Party but switched to the opposition Republican Party around 1920. In 1931 he was appointed Minister of Foreign Relations by president Daniel Salamanca. He actually won the 1934 presidential elections, but these were annulled by the leaders of the military coup that toppled Salamanca from power.

This is an old anecdote about Franz Tamayo that is illustrative of his character:

Tamayo lived in La Paz, and every morning he would get up early and spend 15 minutes gazing from his balcony to the imposing Illimani, the highest of the mountains surrounding the city.

After a while, a man came to live in the same building as Tamayo, and one morning he saw him in his "ritual". "Franz", he called out, for Tamayo was well known in the city. "Franz!". After some minutes of shouting and receiving no answer, he lost his temper and shouted "For God's sake, Franz, what is your problem? I am trying to say 'good morning' to you" Tamayo turned around, his eyes on fire, and shouted. "¡Silencio! Dos cumbres se contemplan" ("Silence!, two giants gaze upon each other.)

Another anecdote is:

Tamayo was serving in the Bolivian House of Representatives when he gave one of his famed impassioned speeches before that august body. Inevitably, someone took exception to his thinking and booed the great poet and orator, tossing (of all things) a horseshoe at him to show his displeasure. Tamayo calmly picked up the horseshoe and said aloud "incidentally, would the gentleman who has lost his shoe please come up front to claim it?"

== List of works ==
Year	Work	Genre
1898	Odas	Poetry
1905	"Proverbios sobre la vida, el arte y la ciencia"	Poetry
1917	La Prometheida o las oceánides	Poetry
1922	Nuevos proverbios	Poetry
1924	Proverbios sobre la vida, el arte y la ciencia, fascículo segundo	Poetry
1927	Los nuevos rubayat	Poetry
1932	Scherzos	Poetry
1939	Scopas	Poetry
1945	Epigramas griegos	Poetry
1910	Creación de la pedagogía nacional	Essay
1911	Crítica del duelo	Essay
1915	Horacio y el arte lírico	Essay
1947	Tamayo rinde cuenta	Essay

Political offices
Preceded by Julio A. Gutiérrez	Foreign Minister of Bolivia; 1932–1933	Succeeded by Demetrio Canelas
