= Bolivian socialist parties in 1913–35 =

The first Bolivian Socialist Parties (in Spanish: Partido Socialista, PS) were established in 1913–1935.

The nascent labor movement of the first decade of the 20th century was largely under the influence of the Liberal Party. However, there was a tendency on the part of the organized workers to free themselves from the existing parties and to undertake independent political activity. The oldest of the organizations proclaiming their adherence to Socialism was the “Sociedad Agustín Aspiazu”, which was created as early as 1904. Tomás Monje Gutiérrez, who would be president of Bolivia after the overthrow of the President Gualberto Villarroel López in 1946, was a member of the “Sociedad”.

More important than the "Sociedad Agustín Aspiazu" was the "Centro Obrero de Estudios Sociales". Created in 1914, it was the first Bolivian marxist organization. Its most outstanding figure was Ricardo Perales, a leader of the tailors' organization of Oruro. Its intention was building the socialist party. Some preliminary efforts in that direction had already occurred in 1913 and 1914.

In Potosi a small group of students and workers formed a Socialist Party in 1913. This Party had about 200 members and had contact with the Argentine Socialist Party. The group was much persecuted by the authorities and lasted only about 3 years. Its principal leader was Lucio Mendivil, who would become the first trotsky senator in 1947.

In 1914, in La Paz, the "Federación Obrera" had created a Socialist Party. Its leader was Ezequiel Salvatierra. In elections (1914), the party won 2 seats in the municipal council and 1 in the National Congress. In 1916, it ran a university professor, Zenon Saavedra, for National Congress. This party was disbanded after a few years.

In 1919 and 1920 Socialist parties were established in various Bolivian cities. In September 1920, in La Paz, the "Centro Obrero de Estudios Sociales" patronized the establishment of the Socialist Workers Party. Julio M. Ordonez was named its leader.

In 1919 local Worker's Socialist Party was founded in Oruro. This Party participated in most departmental elections between 1919 and 1923. In 1916, it ran Ricardo Perales, for National Congress.

In 1921, in Oruro, there was an effort made to merge the various regional Socialist parties into a national organization. There were representatives from local parties in La Paz, Oruro, Uyuni, Cochabamba, Potosi, Sucre, and several other cities. Among the people attending were Ricardo Sónico, a deputy of the National Congress; Augusto Várela, alternate deputy for La Paz and leader of the Socialist Party in that city; and Ricardo Perales, alternate deputy for Oruro and leader of the Socialist Party in city. This effort to unite all of the country's Socialist parties was not successful.

The last Socialist party created on 31 December 1930 in La Paz. There developed a quarrel between pro-Communist elements and their opponents. The pro-Communists were expelled. This party was destroyed with the onslaught of the Chaco War.

Finally, Revolutionary Socialist Party was founded in 1929. This Party carried on a vigorous campaign against the government of the President Hernando Siles Reyes and against the threat of war with Paraguay.
