= José Luis Tejada Sorzano =

President of Bolivia from 1934 to 1936

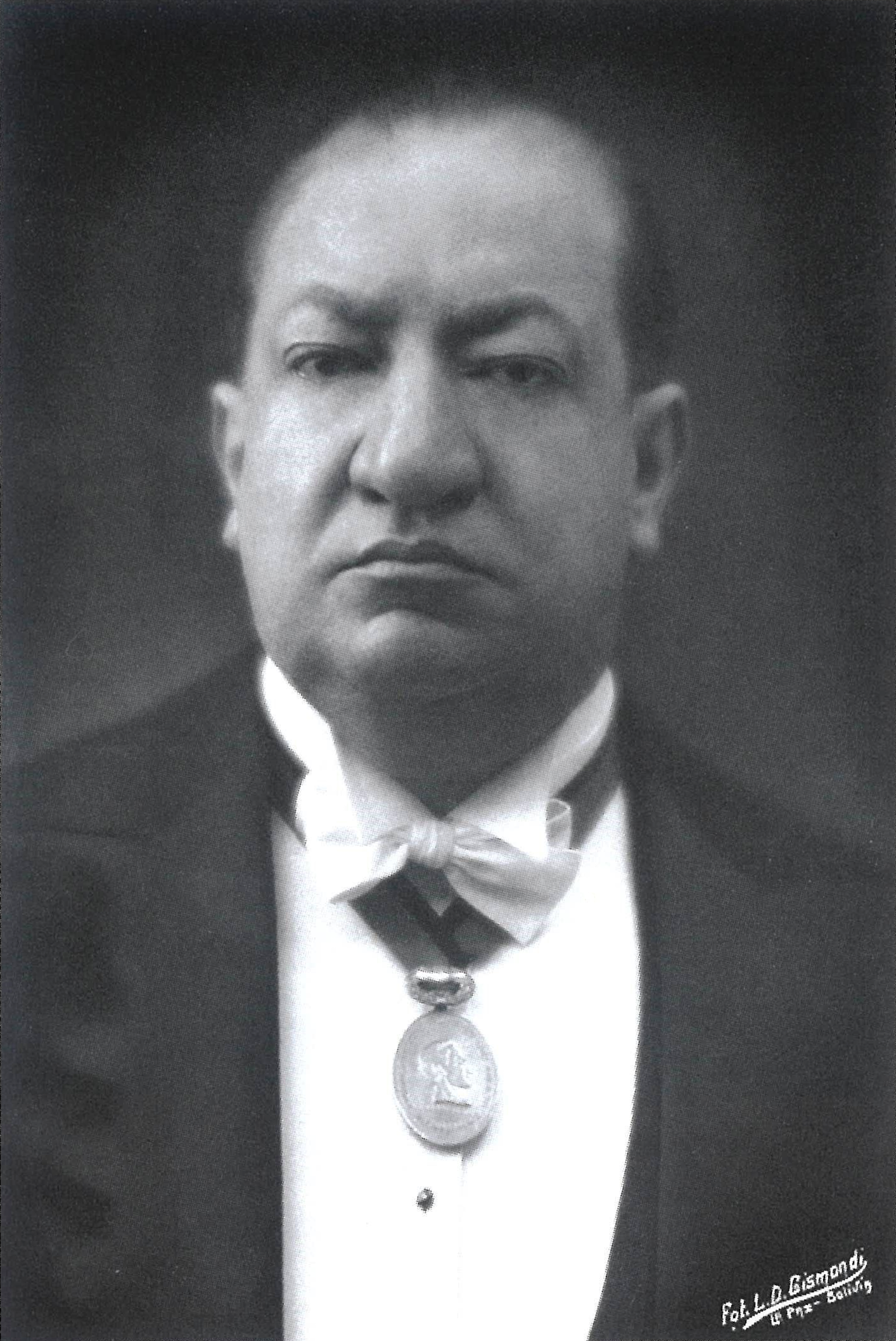
- Portrait by Luigi Domenico Gismondi, c. 1934

34th President of Bolivia
- In office 1 December 1934 – 17 May 1936; Acting: 28 November 1934 – 1 December 1934
- Vice President: Vacant
- Preceded by: Daniel Salamanca
- Succeeded by: David Toro

23rd Vice President of Bolivia
- In office 5 March 1931 – 1 December 1934
- President: Daniel Salamanca
- Preceded by: Abdón Saavedra (1930)
- Succeeded by: Enrique Baldivieso (1938)
Other offices
1st President of the Bolivian Olympic Committee
In office 17 June 1932 – 17 May 1936
Vice President	Alfredo H. Otero
Preceded by	Office established
Succeeded by	Federico Nielsen-Reyes
Minister of Finance
In office 21 March 1919 – 4 October 1919
President	José Gutiérrez Guerra
Preceded by	Darío Gutiérrez
Succeeded by	Demetrio Toro

Personal details
- Born: José Luis Tejada Sorzano; 12 January 1882 La Paz, Bolivia
- Died: 4 October 1938 (aged 56) Arica, Chile
- Party: Liberal
- Spouses: Elvira Flores Artieda (divorced) Lucila Flores Alayza
- Parents: Napoleón Tejada Guzman; Josefa Ruiz de Sorzano Mendoza
- Relatives: Lidia Gueiler; Luis García Meza (nephew)
- Education: Higher University of San Andrés
- Occupation: Economist; lawyer; politician

José Luis Tejada Sorzano (12 January 1882 – 4 October 1938) was a Bolivian economist, lawyer, and politician who served as the 34th president of Bolivia from 1934 to 1936. A member of the Liberal Party, he served as the 23rd vice president from 1931 to 1934 and was minister of finance in 1919.

== Early life ==
José Luis Tejada Sorzano was born on 12 January 1882 in La Paz to Napoleón Tejada Guzman and Josefa Ruiz de Sorzano Mendoza. He completed primary studies at the San Calixto Jesuit School.

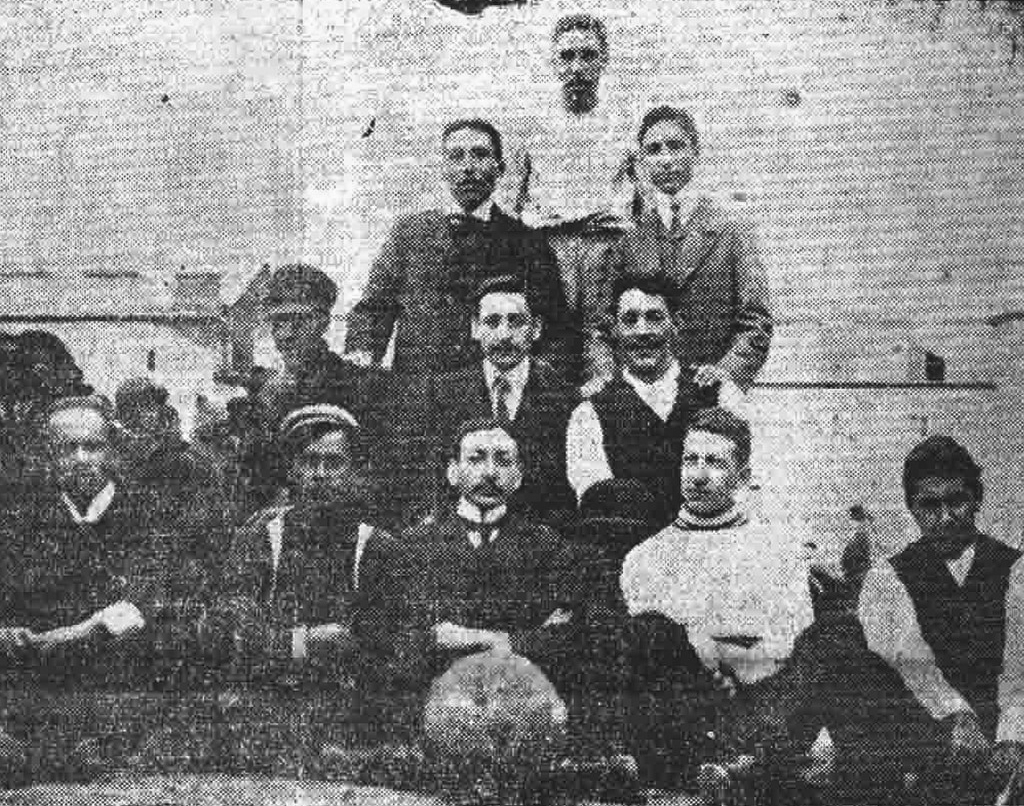
Tejada Sorzano (second from right) as a player in the Thunders FBC

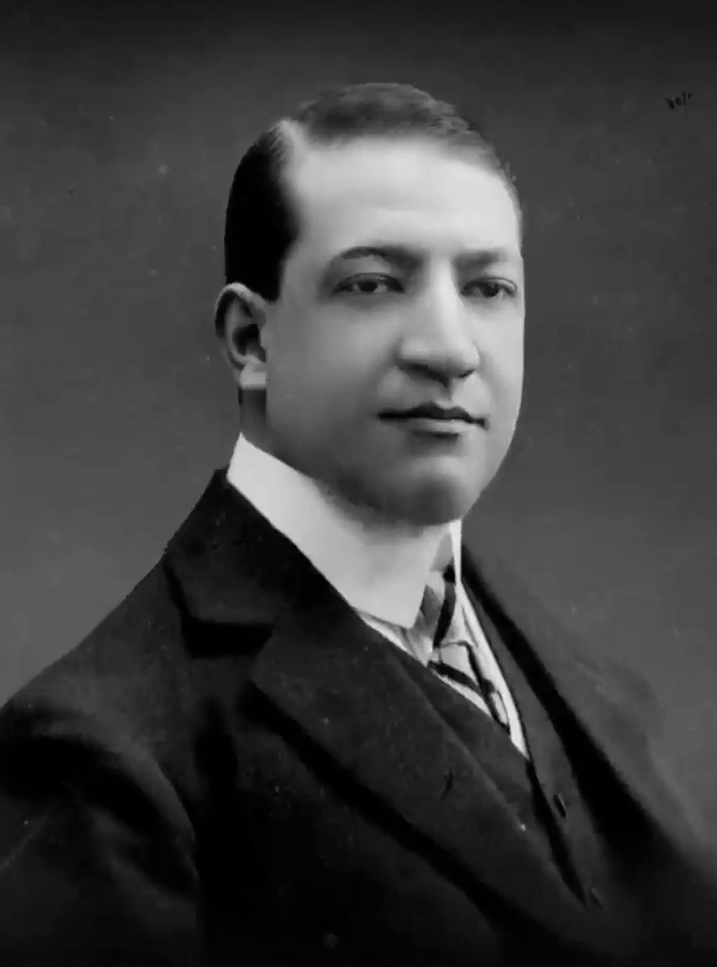
Tejada Sorzano as a deputy c. 1914

=== Football career ===
An avid athlete, in late 1901 Tejada Sorzano was among a group of students who launched an initiative which led to the formation of the Bolivian Rangers Club of La Paz football team. The initial team roster was composed entirely of local members and consisted of fifteen players: Humberto Cuenca, Manuel Estrada, Lizandro Villanueva, David Medeiros, Carlos Farfán, Víctor de la Peña, José Luis Tejada Sorzano, Miguel Larrabure, Carlos Bustillos, Max de la Vega, Óscar Núñez del Prado, Miguel Solares, Augusto Cusicanqui, Luis Maidana and Julio Zuazo Cuenca. On 20 December 1903, Tejada Sorzano as President of the Bolivian Rangers participated in a match against La Paz FBC. The Rangers won 2–0 for which they were awarded a diploma by El Comercio de Bolivia newspaper.

A few years later, he and some of his former team members participated in another student initiative which formed the historical Thunder Football Club in La Paz. In September 1905, the Thunders were chosen by the La Paz prefecture to represent the department in the first interdepartmental football match in Bolivian history against Oruro Royal. The game served to commemorate the inauguration and construction of the Oruro-Viacha railway.

Tejada Sorzano studied law at the Higher University of San Andrés, graduating in 1904. As a university student, he became a member of the Palabras Libres (Free Words) literary cenacle. The group, which included Alcides Arguedas, Armando Chirveches, Abel Alarcón, Fabián Vaca Chávez, Benigno Lara, Roberto Zapata, Walter Méndez, and Rosendo Echazú, was established in May 1905 in La Paz where it published a triweekly column of stories, essays, poems, and political analysis in the newspaper El Diario. Along with Lara and Zapata, Tejada Sorzano focused his writings on such social concerns of the time as women's rights, alcoholism, and pongueaje, the forced labor practiced on the indigenous peoples. The group ended its publication in March 1906, largely as a result of the dispersal of its members due to crack downs by the reigning Liberal government.

=== Political career ===
Despite the repression of Palabras Libres by the government, Tejada Sorzano was nevertheless a lifelong member of the Liberal Party and worked to modernize liberal ideas and criticized the excesses of the mining oligarchy at the expense of civilian sectors. A lawyer by profession, he was active in politics from a very young age, and was elected as a deputy to the National Congress in 1914. On 21 March 1919, President José Gutiérrez Guerra appointed him Minister of Finance, a position he served in until October of that year.

==== 1931 general election ====
In 1931, the military called for new elections following the resignation of Hernando Siles Reyes. The Liberal and Genuine Republican parties which represented the opposition agreed to form a unified coalition, presenting Daniel Salamanca as the Genuine Republican presidential candidate and José Luis Tejada Sorzano as his Liberal running mate. The pair won 100% of the vote in an uncontested election and took office on 5 March 1931.

== Vice president (1931–1934) ==
By Supreme Decree of 17 June 1932, President Salamanca established the Bolivian Olympic Committee. Vice President Tejada Sorzano was appointed as the entity's first president though the outbreak of the Chaco War postponed the new institution's activities.

A relatively hands-off vice president, the portly Tejada deferred to Salamanca in all matters, and distinguished himself very little in his own right during his term as vice president. He seems to have been "second-fiddle" even on intra-party matters, as the true leader of the Liberals was the septuagenarian, twice-elected former President Ismael Montes (who died only in 1933). Things changed considerably, however, when President Salamanca was suddenly deposed by the Bolivian military on 27 November 1934, as a result of long-festering differences with the High Command regarding the conduct of the war. For a variety of reasons, the army decided to maintain democratic appearances and deferred taking power itself, at least for the time being, and Tejada became president after Salamanca was forced to resign.

It can safely be argued that the military acquiesced to the assumption of Tejada to the presidency with the understanding that the latter would be far more malleable and agreeable to the wishes of the High Command than Salamanca had been. This indeed proved to be the case.

== President (1934–1936) ==
With Tejada's assumption of the presidency, the Liberals returned to power for the first time in 14 years. Almost immediately, Tejada engineered in the Congress the extension of his term by one year in order to see through the end of the war, whose cause had been rather disastrous to Bolivia. A spate of relatively small successes (mostly of a defensive nature) toward the end of the conflict did not prevent Paraguay from maintaining control of much of the disputed region at the time that agreement on a ceasefire was finally reached in June 1935. However, the Bolivian military and most political leaders concluded that no better terms could be achieved given the circumstances or in the conceivable future. Eventually, a final peace treaty would grant most of the Chaco to Paraguay, reducing Bolivia's territory considerably.

Despite his best intentions, Tejada seems to have been disdained by the Bolivian military leaders from the very beginning. He was considered part of the political elites that, as they saw it, got Bolivia into the war with their irresponsible demagoguery (for example, Salamanca's insistence that Bolivia "stand firm in the Chaco" and his orders to build more forts in the disputed region, in direct competition with Paraguay) and then refused to provide the needed material support to win the conflict. They apparently had no explanation as to why Paraguay, which was even poorer and smaller than Bolivia and thus supplied even less adequately, still managed to prevail in the field of battle simply with better tactics and superior leadership. In any case, at this point two competing myths emerged as to why Bolivia had lost: one, advocated by important civilian political elites (but not President Tejada), placed all the blame on the personalistic, undisciplined Bolivian commanders, ever-eager to increase their own individual ambitions and even willing to overthrow the President of the Republic (as indeed happened in 1934) rather to expend all its energy in the conduct of the war. The alternative myth, emanating from the defeated armed forces themselves (who had to explain the debacle somehow), held that it was the politicians who had "sold out" the simple, honor-bound soldiers by leading them precipitously to war and then not suitably equipping them to win it. Of the two, the latter myth seemed more acceptable to the populace, and generalized anger began to be displaced toward Tejada.

At the same time, Tejada was still confronting crippling economic difficulties which had been made even worse by the long war. Furthermore, he was facing a looming crisis over the controversial role of the U.S.-based Standard Oil Corporation during the conflict. At the very least, Standard had refused to help Bolivia in its direst hour during the war, and at worst it was guilty of illegal activities contrary to the wishes and interests of the Bolivian government. Unable to make headway on either problem, Tejada provided the malcontent younger officers of the Bolivian military just the excuse they needed to overthrow the Constitutional order and install themselves in power. This would also allow them to continue to "cleanse" the image of the Bolivian armed forces and further propagate the myth that the war had been lost by politicians rather than by the men in uniform. It was thus that Tejada was finally removed from office in a coup d'état which was led by Major Germán Busch and which installed as de facto President of Bolivia Colonel David Toro on 22 May 1936.

During his presidency, the Workers' Insurance and Savings Bank was passed, which provided miners with a degree of protection.

== Death ==
Forced into exile, Tejada died in Arica, Chile, only 2 years later, on 4 October 1938.

== Publications ==
- Tejada Sorzano, José Luis (1905). Report of Mr. Jose Luis Tejada Sorzano on the tin business (in Spanish). Santiago, Chile.
- Tejada Sorzano, José Luis (1909). Cuestiones económicas: despues de la crisis : estudio referente á Bolivia (in Spanish).
- Tejada Sorzano, José Luis (1920). Report on the Development of Commercial Relations Between the United States and Bolivia.
- Tejada Sorzano, José Luis (1929). The Bolivian Aspiration to the Sea. American Lithograph Company.

== See also ==
- Cabinet of José Luis Tejada Sorzano

Political offices
Preceded by Darío Gutiérrez	Minister of Finance; 1919	Succeeded by Demetrio Toro
Preceded by Abdón Saavedra	Vice President of Bolivia; 1931–1934	Succeeded by Enrique Baldivieso
Preceded by Daniel Salamanca	President of Bolivia; 1934–1936	Succeeded by David Toro
Sporting positions
Office established	President of the Bolivian Olympic Committee; 1932–1936	Succeeded by Federico Nielsen-Reyes
