= Carlos Víctor Aramayo =

Former Bolivian industrialist and politician

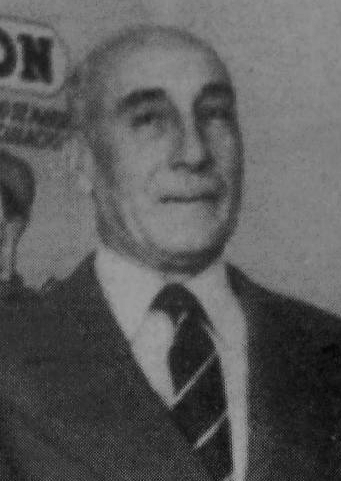

Minister of Finance and Industry
- In office 1 December 1934 – 12 April 1935
- President: José Luis Tejada Sorzano
- Preceded by: Joaquín Espada
- Succeeded by: Federico Gutiérrez Granier

Minister of Foreign Affairs and Worship
- Acting
- In office 5 April 1935 – 12 April 1935
- President: José Luis Tejada Sorzano
- Preceded by: David Alvéstegui Laredo
- Succeeded by: Tomás Manuel Elío

Personal details
- Born: 7 October 1889 Paris, France
- Died: 14 April 1981 (aged 91) Paris, France
- Occupation: South American industrialist

Carlos Víctor Aramayo (7 October 1889, Paris – 14 April 1981, Paris) was a Bolivian industrialist and politician.

== Biography ==
Aramayo was one of Bolivia's three principal tin magnates alongside Simón Iturri Patiño and Mauricio Hochschild in the early 20th century. Responsible for over half of global tin production, they were known as the three tin barons.

In 1926, Carlos Víctor Aramayo was appointed President of Compagnie Aramayo de Mines en Bolivie SA (CAMB) with headquarters in Geneva, Switzerland. The holding company represented the assets of the Aramayo family in mining (mainly bismuth, tin, tungsten, and other metals) and land properties across Bolivia.

As CAMB President, one of Aramayo's first major decision was to form a subsidiary for CAMB in charge of the purchase of machinery and supplies and for hiring specialist personnel around Europe. In 1929, Mining and Chemical Products Ltd (MCP) was formed in London. Around the same time, Aramayo was appointed as Bolivia's Ambassador to London and then to Paris.

In 1935, Aramayo was appointed as finance minister by president José Luis Tejada Sorzano.

Throughout the Second World War, MCP contributed to the Allied war effort by producing and selling vital anti-aircraft gun components exclusively to the US and to the UK.

In 1952 CAMB's mines and all other properties in Bolivia were nationalised by the Bolivian revolution of 1952.

During his lifetime, Aramayo had different important positions in his country and abroad as newspaper owner (La Razon), Member of Congress, Ambassador of Bolivia to London and Paris, Minister of Finance and Minister of Foreign Affairs during president Sorzano's term.

After his death, he was succeeded as President of CAMB and MCP by his nephew John German-Ribon.

Political offices
Preceded by Joaquín Espada	Minister of Finance and Industry; 1934–1935	Succeeded by Federico Gutiérrez Granier
Preceded by David Alvéstegui Laredo	Minister of Foreign Affairs and Worship; Acting; 1935	Succeeded by Tomás Manuel Elío
