= Ignacio Calderón (diplomat) =

Bolivian politician and diplomat

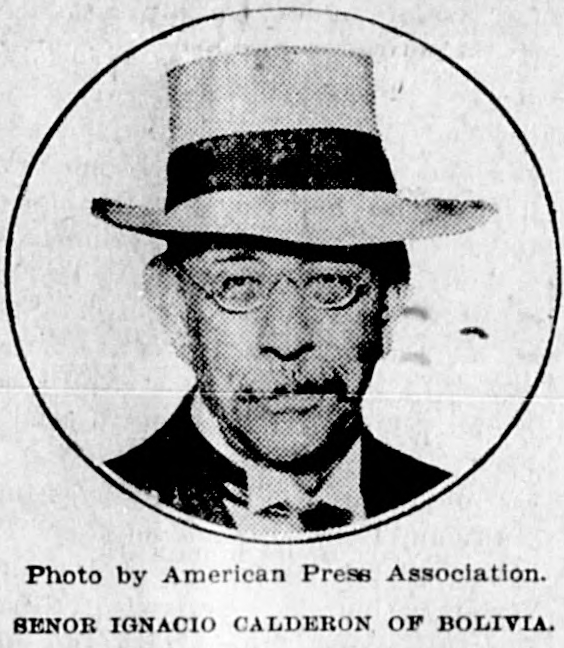
Calderón in 1915

Ignacio Calderón (July 31, 1848 in La Paz—April 26, 1927 in Washington, DC) was a Bolivian politician and diplomat who served as Envoy Extraordinary and Minister Plenipotentiary of Bolivia to the United States, representing the government of Ismael Montes.

== Career ==
Calderón graduated from the University of La Paz at 19, and spent a year there teaching history. He subsequently joined the Bolivian legation in Rome, after which he served as national superintendent of public instruction, then as a member of the Bolivian legation in Lima. In that role, he was given permission to attend the 1876 Centennial Exposition in Philadelphia, where he met Arcadia Yarnell of Baltimore; they married in 1877.

He briefly served as Bolivian consul general in New York City before returning to Bolivia, where he worked in imports/exports and banking until 1900, when he was appointed Secretary of the Treasury under José Manuel Pando.

In 1904, he was appointed Envoy; he was officially received by Theodore Roosevelt on May 27.

== Later life ==
After the 1920 Bolivian coup d'état, Calderón retired as Envoy, and remained in Washington for the rest of his life.
