= 1914 Bolivian legislative election =

Parliamentary elections were held in Bolivia in May 1914 to elect half the seats of the Chamber Deputies and one-third of the Senate.

== Results ==
Party	Votes	%	Seats					
Party	Votes	%	Chamber			Senate		
Party	Votes	%	Elected	Total	+/–	Elected	Total	+/–
Liberal Party			34	69	–1	5	16	0
Socialist Party			1	1	New	0	0	New
Total			35	70	0	5	16	0
Source: Cáceres

=== Elected members ===
The new senators were:

- Arturo Molina Campero, PL (Tarija)
- Andrés S. Muñoz, PL (La Paz)
- Manuel E. Aramayo, PL (Potosí)
- José Antezana, PL Potosí
- Julio A. Gutiérrez, PL (Santa Cruz)
