= Nationalist Party (Bolivia) =

Nationalist Party Partido Nacionalista
- Leader: Hernando Siles Reyes
- Founded: 29 December 1926
- Dissolved: c. 1930
- Ideology: Nationalism; Reformism; Economic liberalism (1927)

The Nationalist Party (in Spanish: Partido Nacionalista, PN) was a Bolivian reformist and nationalist political party.

The Nationalist Party was founded on 29 December 1926 by President of the Republic Hernando Siles Reyes and a group of young intellectuals, such as Augusto Céspedes, Carlos Montenegro, and Enrique Baldivieso.

Hernando Siles Reyes was one of the founders of the Republican party (1914) and the Socialist Republican Party (1921). He was Bautista Saavedra's hand-picked successor, but once in power, he broke from him and formed his own faction, which became the Nationalist Party.

The Government of Hernando Siles Reyes enacted progressive social reforms. Despite all this, the Siles government soon ran into economic and political difficulties associated with the far-reaching effects of the Great Depression of 1929. The Nationalist Party became a semi-official party and Siles' sole base of support. It was a fragile base. In the midst of economic crisis and social unrest, Siles, in 1929, declared his intention to remain in office with the Nationalists' support. This sin of sins in the intra-elite circulation battle sparked the formation of a united front of all other parties, against Siles. The opposition made its move on 27 June 1930. In a rapid coup, Siles and the Nationalists were easily toppled.

As a result of the 1930 coup, the Nationalist Party lost much of its influence. Hernando Siles lived the rest of his life in exile, dying in Lima in 1942.

Although the Nationalist Party lost control of the government, leading figures in the party, such as Enrique Baldivieso, Augusto Cespedes, and Carlos Montenegro, continued to play important roles in national politics. Some of them were associated with the revolutionary governments of Colonels David Toro and Germán Busch between 1936 and 1939. Some of the ex-Nationalists figured among the founders of the United Socialist Party (1936); others were absorbed into the Revolutionary Nationalist Movement (1941).
