= Fidel Valdez =

Bolivian politician (died 1922)

Minister of Finance and Industry
- In office 15 March 1904 – Unknown
- President: José Manuel Pando
- Succeeded by: Daniel Salamanca

Justice of the Supreme Court
- In office 20 August 1905 – 20 August 1909
- In office 22 March 1921 – 17 May 1922

Vice President-elect of Bolivia
- In office 1908–1908

Personal details
- Born: Bolivia
- Died: 17 May 1922 Bolivia
- Occupation: Politician; jurist; lawyer

Fidel Valdez (died 17 May 1922) was a Bolivian lawyer and politician who served in many governmental roles, as well as being elected Vice President of Bolivia, though he was never inaugurated due to the political instability in Bolivia at the time.

== Biography ==
On 15 March 1904, a decree from the President of Bolivia José Manuel Pando declared Valdez the Minister of Finance and Industry of Bolivia, taking over from future Bolivian president Daniel Salamanca. His date of leaving this position is unknown.

Valdez served as a member of the Supreme Court of Justice of Bolivia, including terms from 1905–1909, as well as 1921 until his death in 1922.
