= Juan María Zalles =

Bolivian politician (1879–1954)

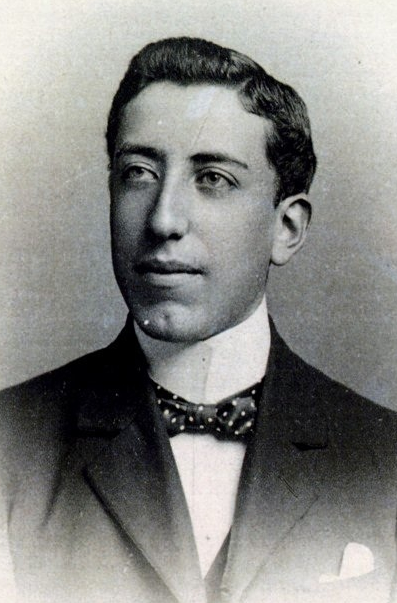

Foreign Minister of Bolivia
- In office March 9, 1932 – September 5, 1932
- Preceded by: Julio A. Gutiérrez
- Succeeded by: Julio A. Gutiérrez

Minister of Government and Development
- In office August 7, 1914 – April 3, 1915
- Preceded by: Claudio Pinilla
- Succeeded by: Arturo Molina Campero

Minister of War and Colonisation
- In office September 21, 1912 – August 14, 1913

Personal details
- Born: March 25, 1879 La Paz, Bolivia
- Died: 1954 Santiago, Chile
- Party: Liberal Party
- Education: University of San Andrés

Juan María Zalles Calderón (March 25, 1879 — 1954) was a Bolivian lawyer, diplomat, journalist and politician, who served as Minister of the Interior from 1914 to 1915. As a diplomat, he represented his country in Chile, Peru and Argentina. He also wrote in El Diario, El Comercio de Bolivia and La Época.
