= Concordance (Bolivia) =

Concordance Concordancia
- Founded: March 1939
- Political position: Right-wing
- Colors: Blue

The Concordance (Spanish: Concordancia) was an electoral political alliance of the right-wing and traditionalist political parties in Bolivia.

The Concordance was established in March 1939, for the 1940 presidential and congressional elections, by the Liberal Party (PL), the Genuine Republican Party (PRG), and the Republican Socialist Party (PRS).

Concordance presented as its presidential candidate General Enrique Peñaranda del Castillo, who had commanded the Bolivian Army during the latter part of the Chaco War.
