= Hernando Siles =

President of Bolivia from 1926 to 1930

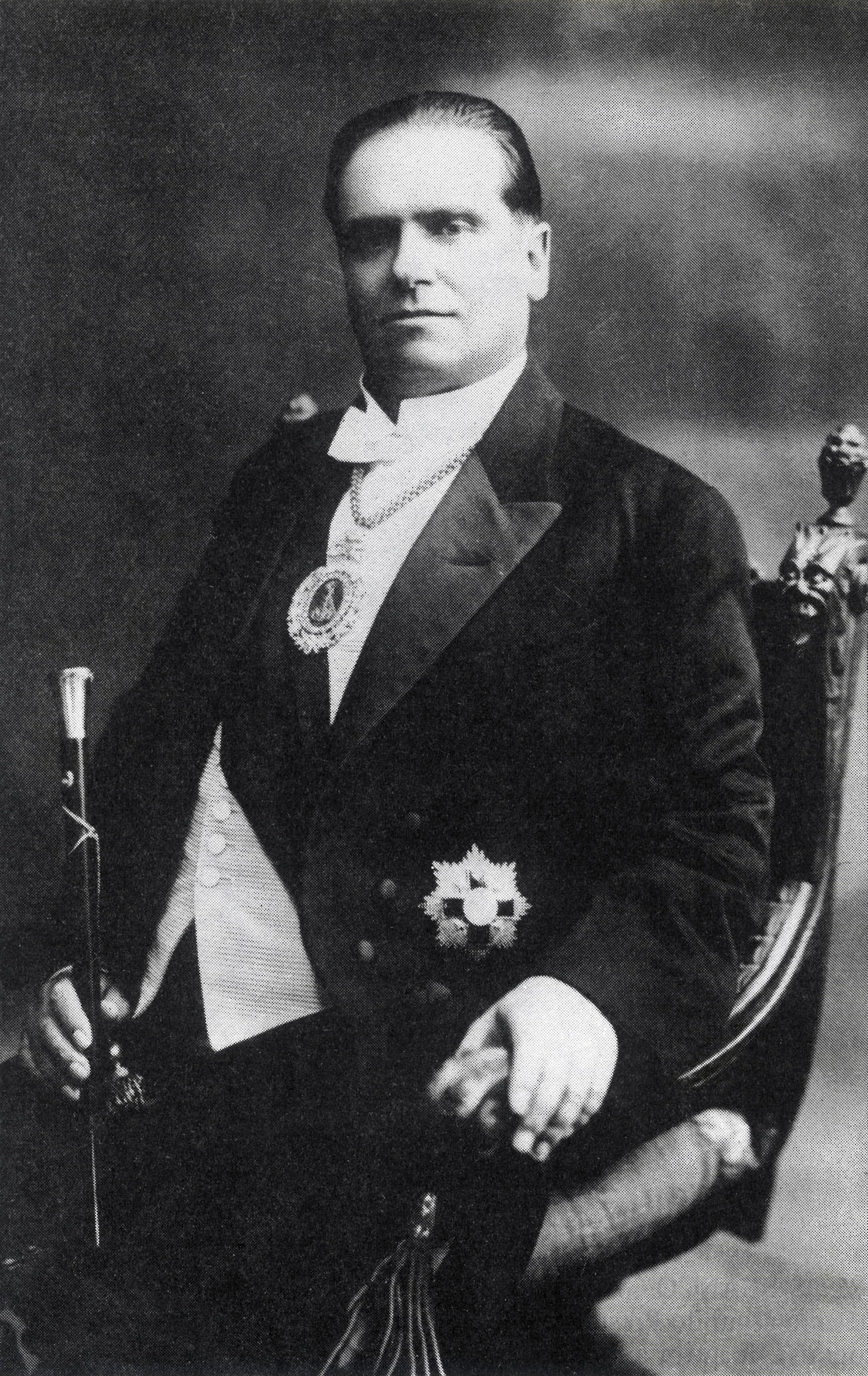
- Official portrait, c. 1926–1930

31st President of Bolivia
- In office 10 January 1926 – 28 May 1930
- Vice President: Abdón Saavedra
- Preceded by: Felipe S. Guzmán (provisional)
- Succeeded by: Carlos Blanco Galindo
Ministerial offices
Minister of War and Colonization
In office 27 June 1922 – 23 January 1923
President	Bautista Saavedra
Preceded by	Pastor Baldivieso
Succeeded by	Hans Kundt
Minister of Instruction and Agriculture
In office 9 January 1922 – 27 June 1922
President	Bautista Saavedra
Preceded by	Ricardo Jaimes Freyre
Succeeded by	Felipe S. Guzmán

Personal details
- Born: Hernando Siles Reyes; 5 August 1882 Sucre, Bolivia
- Died: 23 November 1942 (aged 60) Lima, Peru
- Party: Nationalist (after 1926); Republican (before 1926)
- Spouse: Luisa Salinas Vega
- Children: Hernán; Luis Adolfo; Jorge
- Parents: Adolfo Siles Lucuis; Remedios Reyes Nestares
- Education: University of San Francisco Xavier
- Occupation: Academic; lawyer; politician

Hernando Siles Reyes (5 August 1882 – 23 November 1942) was a Bolivian academic, lawyer, and politician who served as the 31st president of Bolivia from 1926 to 1930.

== Early life and education ==
Born in Sucre, Siles graduated as a lawyer from the University of San Francisco Xavier and spent his early career in academia. He taught as a professor at the Higher University of San Andrés and was rector of his alma mater from 1917 to 1920. He authored several law books, particularly those on civil law.

== Career ==
In politics, Siles gravitated toward the Republican Party and was elected to represent Oruro in the National Convention of 1920, later serving as senator for Chuquisaca. He served under Bautista Saavedra as minister of instruction in 1922 and minister of war from 1922 to 1923. Following the annulment of the May 1925 presidential election, Siles was chosen as the Republican nominee for the December do-over and was elected president without significant opposition.

During his presidency, a decree was issued in September 1929 that laid down certain rules for safeguarding young people and women in industrial employment. Siles also distanced himself from Saavedra and broke ties with the Republicans, founding his own Nationalist Party with the support of young intellectuals. His administration continued to borrow heavily for public works while also modernizing the financial system. Following the stock market crash of 1929, the economy under Siles was beset by the effects of the Great Depression. In foreign policy, he prioritized peaceful relations with Paraguay, which delayed an armed conflict over the disputed Gran Chaco. Near the end of his presidency, Siles sought to unilaterally extend his term in office; he orchestrated a self-coup in 1930 but was thwarted by the military, which overthrew his government.

Exiled abroad, Siles largely retired from politics. He held diplomatic roles as ambassador to Mexico and Peru. He died in Lima in 1942. The nascent nationalist movement he fostered inspired the formation of significant ideological movements down the line. His elder son, Hernán, also served as president, from 1956 to 1960 and 1982 to 1989, as did his younger son, Luis Adolfo, who held office in 1969. The Hernando Siles Stadium is named after him.

== Notes ==
Academic offices
Preceded by Luis Caballero	Rector of the University of Saint Francis Xavier; 1917–1920	Succeeded by Ezequiel Luis; Osorio Téllez
Political offices
Preceded by Ricardo Jaimes Freyre	Minister of Instructions and Agriculture; 1922	Succeeded by Felipe Segundo Guzmán
Preceded by Pastor Baldivieso	Minister of War and Colonization; 1922–1923	Succeeded by Hans Kundt
Preceded by Felipe Segundo Guzmán; Provisional	President of Bolivia; 1926–1930	Vacant Council of Ministers Title next held by Carlos Blanco Galindo
