= Bautista Saavedra =

President of Bolivia from 1921 to 1925

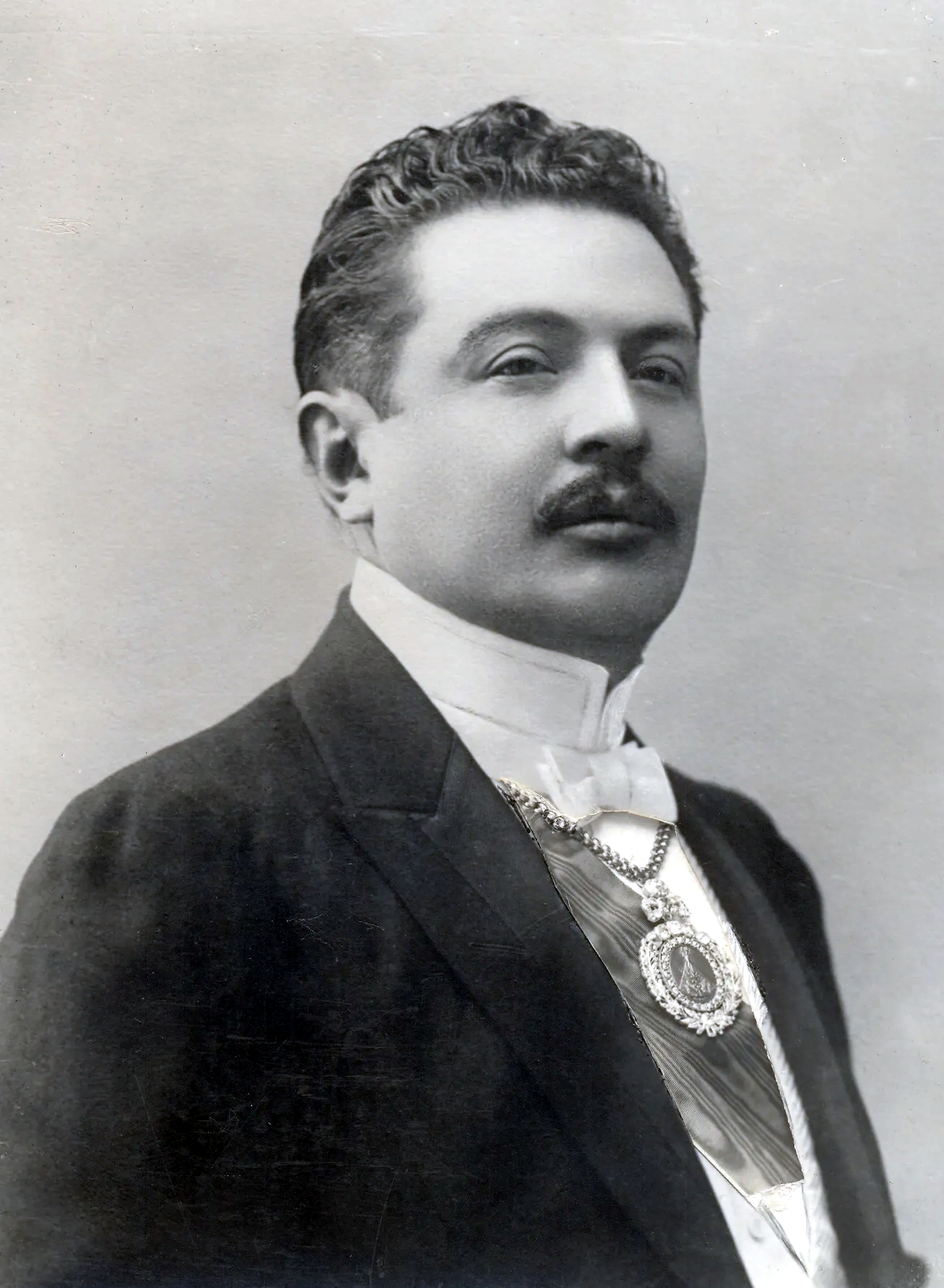
- Official portrait, c. 1921–1925

29th President of Bolivia
- In office 28 January 1921 – 3 September 1925
- Vice President: Vacant
- Preceded by: José Gutiérrez Guerra
- Succeeded by: Felipe S. Guzmán (provisional)

Member of the Government Junta
- In office 13 July 1920 – 28 January 1921
- Preceded by: Office established
- Succeeded by: Office dissolved

Minister of National Defense
- In office 29 November 1934 – 14 December 1934
- President: José Luis Tejada
- Preceded by: Zacarías Benavides
- Succeeded by: Enrique Baldivieso

Minister of Instruction and Justice
- In office 14 August 1909 – 29 October 1910
- President: Eliodoro Villazón
- Preceded by: Daniel Sánchez Bustamante
- Succeeded by: Arturo Loayza

Personal details
- Born: Bautista Saavedra Mallea; 30 August 1870 Sorata, La Paz, Bolivia
- Died: 1 March 1939 (aged 68) Santiago, Chile
- Party: Republican (after 1914); Liberal (before 1914)
- Spouse: Julia Bustillos (m. 1901)
- Parents: Zenón Saavedra; Josefa Mallea
- Relatives: Abdón Saavedra (brother)
- Education: Higher University of San Andrés

Bautista Saavedra Mallea (30 August 1870 – 1 March 1939) was a Bolivian lawyer and politician who served as the 29th President of Bolivia from 1921 to 1925. He obtained power through a coup d'état supported by the military and was able to withstand coup attempts by the military. Holding anti-indigenous views, he suppressed an indigenous protest in Jesús de Machaca, killing hundreds.

== Early life and education ==
Saavedra attended Colegio San Calixto and graduated from the Higher University of San Andrés with a law degree.

== Career ==
Saavedra was Minister of Education under President Eliodoro Villazón. From 1914 to 1920, Saavedra was the leader of the Republican Party in La Paz.

== Presidency ==
Saavedra attempted to obtain an ocean port for Bolivia through the League of Nations. A number of reforms were also carried out during his presidency, including an improved strike law, a compulsory savings scheme, and a law that obliged employers to pay accident compensation to their staff.

Indigenous people in Jesús de Machaca protested economic exploitation by merchants and expanding haciendas. Lucio T. Estrada, a corregidor, was sent to Jesús de Machaca by Saavedra, but Estrada and his family were murdered by protesters on 12 March 1921, due to his support for the merchants. Saavedra sent the military to suppress the protesters, resulting in a massacre that killed hundreds.

=== Coups ===
Saavedra was aware that he could not obtain power through legal means as elections in Bolivia were fraudulent. He started gaining contacts with the military in 1918. Gumercindo Heguigarre and Andrés Valle, both lieutenant colonels, were recruited to Saavedra's cause. On 12 July 1920, Valle and other officers went to the Campero Regiment’s barracks and organised 780 conscripts to the city centre. Saavedra organised his supporters into the Republican Guard under Valle's leadership and placed his headquarters only one block away from the presidential and legislative palaces in La Paz.

Saavedra, Daniel Salamanca, and José María Escalier formed a military junta. Saavedra was elected president in January 1921. The United States recognised his government on 10 February.

Juan José Fernández, one of the officers involved in the coup that placed Saavedra in power, attempted to overthrow Saavedra in January 1921 by marching a battalion of men into Plaza Murillo. However, his colleagues convinced him to end the coup attempt.

Hans Kundt was given Bolivian citizenship and made chief of staff in February 1921. Kundt was a major source of stability for Saavedra's government.

=== Oil ===
Standard Oil of New Jersey was given an oil concession in Bolivia by Saavedra in 1922. A law passed in 1921 limited concessions to 100,000 hectares, but Saavedra issued a supreme decree in December 1921 to give Stanard Oil permission to obtain the 700,000 hectares concession from Richmond Levering & Company. A new contract was made between Standard Oil and Bolivia in July 1922, which removed Bolivia's ability to confiscate properties for fraud and lowered royalties to the state from 15% to 11%. After the contract was signed Standard Oil agreed to reduce its total concessions in Bolivia from 3,238,000 to 2 million hectares.

On 27 March and 27 August 1923, Saavedra started cancelling contracts given to speculative and unsuccessful oil companies, but Standard Oil and Jacobo Backus were exempted. However, on 5 December he cancelled Backus' contracts and Backus lost his deposit of 100,000 bolivianos. Backus sued against this and the Supreme Court of Justice of Bolivia ruled in his favour on 25 March 1929.

== Legacy ==
Bautista Saavedra Province was named in honour of Saavedra.

== Political positions ==
From 1900 to 1904, Saavedra was the defense attorney for indigenous people accused of killing Liberal Party soldiers during the Bolivian Civil War. He argued that the defendants were engaged in a political and social cause against the white and mestizo people that ruled over them and were not common criminals.

El ayllu, a study of the development of Andean social organisation, was published by Saavedra in 1903. He called for the state to remove indigenous people from their land and to assault the "anachronistic ayllu".

Saavedra stated that indigenous peoples should be exploited to Bolivia's benefit or exterminated if they slow progress. He opposed giving indigenous people self-governance as it "impedes all attempts at reform and progress and maintains, in latent forms, the ancient hatred of the Indian against the white race".

== Works cited ==
=== Books ===
- Current History. Vol. 14. The New York Times. 1921.
- Aljovín de Losada, Cristóbal; Jacobsen, Nils, eds. (2005). Political Cultures in the Andes, 1750-1950. Duke University Press. ISBN 9780822386612.
- Cole, Stephen (2016). Oil and Nation: A History of Bolivia's Petroleum Sector. West Virginia University Press. ISBN 9781943665495.
- Shesko, Elizabeth (2020). Conscript Nation: Coercion and Citizenship in the Bolivian Barracks. University of Pittsburgh Press. ISBN 9780822987383.
- Smale, Robert (2010). I Sweat the Flavor of Tin: Labor Activism in Early Twentieth-Century Bolivia. University of Pittsburgh Press. ISBN 9780822973904.
- Zulawski, Ann (2007). Unequal Cures: Public Health and Political Change in Bolivia, 1900–1950. Duke University Press. ISBN 9780822390022.

=== Journals ===
- Niebuhr, Robert (2019). "Economic Conquest of the Pacific: Revisiting the Tacna-Arica Plebiscite of 1925–1926". Journal of World History. 30 (4). University of Hawaiʻi Press: 471–500. doi:10.2307/26833012. JSTOR 26833012.

Political offices
| Vacant Title last held by Daniel Sánchez Bustamante | Minister of Instruction and Justice; 1909–1910 | Succeeded by Arturo Loayza |
| Vacant Government Junta Title last held by José Gutiérrez Guerra | President of Bolivia; 1921–1925 | Succeeded by Felipe Segundo Guzmán; Provisional |
| Preceded by Zacarías Benavides | Minister of National Defense; 1934 | Succeeded by Gabriel Gosálvez |
