= Republican Party (Bolivia) =

Defunct political party in Bolivia

Republican Party Partido Republicano
- Leader: Bautista Saavedra
- Founders: José Manuel Pando; Jose María Escalier; Daniel Salamanca; Bautista Saavedra
- Founded: 1914
- Dissolved: c. 1952
- Split from: Liberal Party
- Ideology: Republicanism; Liberal conservatism Reformism; Populism; 1920–1935: Socialism; Paternalistic conservatism
- Political position: 1914–1920: Centre-right; 1920–1935: Centre to centre-left 1935–1952: Centre-right to right-wing

The Republican Party (Spanish: Partido Republicano; PR), known as the Socialist Republican Party (Spanish: Partido Republicano Socialista; PRS) from 1935, was a political party in Bolivia that existed from 1914 to c. 1952. The party espoused liberal conservative principles, and sat at the center right of the political spectrum. Led by Bautista Saavedra, its members became known as saavedristas.

Founded in 1914 as the Republican Union (Spanish: Unión Republicana) by disaffected Liberals, the party differed little ideologically from its predecessor. It participated in the 1917 presidential election before taking power in a coup d'état in 1920 that installed a government junta. In 1921, Bautista Saavedra was elected president, and his wing of the party became dominant, being labeled the Government Republican Party (Spanish: Partido Republicano de Gobierno) and, later, the Saavedra Republican Party (Spanish: Partido Republicano Saavedrista). A competing faction split to form the Genuine Republican Party.

Saavedra led the Republicans as a personalist party. He engineered the election of Hernando Siles as his successor, with his brother, Abdón Saavedra, as vice president. Early in his term, Siles split with Saavedra and formed the Nationalist Party, absorbing much of the Republicans' populist and reformist appeal. The party became identified with the political establishment in the period preceding and during the Chaco War.

Upon the conflict's conclusion, the Republicans adopted the "socialist" label to appeal to rising anti-establishment sentiment. The party supported the 1936 coup d'état that brought the military to power, but relations soon soured. Saavedra's faction was expelled, while a rival antipersonalist faction led by Gabriel Gosálvez remained. Following Saavedra's death in exile in 1939, the party joined the Concordance, which governed from 1940 to 1943. The Socialist and Genuine Republicans merged into the Republican Socialist Unity Party in 1946, maintaining their internal independence, and governed again from 1947 to 1951. After the 1952 National Revolution, the party slipped into obscurity.

== History ==
In 1914, the political abuses and economic policies of the long-incumbent Liberal Party (PL) led José Manuel Pando, Bautista Saavedra, Daniel Salamanca, and José María Escalier to break away from the party. They formed the Republican Union, later renamed as the Republican Union Party (Spanish: Partido de la Unión Republicana), colloquially referred to as the Republican Party (PR).

The platform of Republican Party was preoccupied with the recovery of Bolivia's lost maritime territories and typically demanded more morality in government, but its program differed little from traditional liberal slogans. In 1917, the Republicans ran a presidential candidate but were defeated in the Liberal-controlled elections. The Republican Party grabbed power in a bloodless coup on 12 July 1920.

In 1921, Saavedra assumes the presidency as the Republicans split into two personalist factions headed by the party's caudillos. The escalieristas, supporters of Escalier, split to form the Genuine Republican Party (PRG), while the conservative saavedrista faction became known as the Government Republican Party.

Saavedra, a populist, represented the middle-class and resented the old party's close ties to the powerful tin barons. His appeal to urban middle-class artisans, small merchants, and laborers generated an anti-establishment political base and a new class consciousness. The Republican government of Saavedra enacted progressive social and labor codes and doubled government taxes on mining. Though more concerned for the underprivileged classes, Saavedra blatantly manipulated his populist support.

In the 1925 elections the PR's presidential candidate was Hernando Siles. He was elected president and took office on 10 January 1926.

During the rule of Saavedra and Siles, the Bolivian economy underwent a profound change. Tin prices started to decline in the 1920s. After peaking in 1929, tin production declined dramatically as the Great Depression nearly destroyed the international tin market. During the 1920s, Bolivia faced growing social turmoil. Labor unrest, such as the miners' strike in Uncia in 1923, was brutally suppressed. But the unrest reached new heights of violence after the drastic reduction of the work force during the Great Depression. The social legislation of the Republican governments was weak. Siles's four years of inconsistent rule and unfulfilled promises of radical changes frustrated workers and students. In 1930 he was overthrown when he tried to bypass the constitutional provision forbidding reelection by resigning in order to run again.

Shortly before the Chaco War, the party refounded. A fifty-member National Council was formed as the new leading body of the party. In 1935, after the Chaco War, Saavedra tagged on the term "socialist" to the party's name, making it the Socialist Republican Party (PRS), to appeal to postwar reformist sentiment. However, the label was "meaningless" and the party remained identified with traditional prewar ideas.

The PRS charged the traditional elites with being responsible for the failures of the war. This discourse struck a chord with the radicalized middle class of the country. The party was joined by a number of middle class intellectuals, as well as some trade unionists and Marxists. This development worried the Socialist Party, which charged that Saavedra was not without responsibility for the war nor was he innocent of the killings of miners and peasants in Uncía, Llallagua, Catavi and Jesús de Machaca. However, both parties supported the military government of Colonel David Toro in 1936–1937.

In a bloodless revolution on 17 May 1936, the government of Liberals and Genuine Republicans was overthrown. The coup was led by Colonel Germán Busch Becerra, and he was supported by the PRS. For the 1938 elections, the PRS was the component of the Socialist Single Front.

As a part of the Concordancia-Democratic Alliance formed in March 1939 (along with the Genuine Republicans and Liberals), the PRS supported the military governments of Carlos Quintanilla 1939–1940 and Enrique Peñaranda 1940–1943. In February 1943 the PRS, Socialist Party, Genuine Republicans and the Liberals signed a pact ahead of the upcoming presidential elections.

In 1943 after Gualberto Villarroel’s revolution, the Republican Socialist Party, the Genuine Republican Party, Liberal Party and Revolutionary Left Party formed the opposition Antifascist Democratic Front.

On 10 November 1946, the PRS merged with the Genuine Republican Party, the United Socialist Party and Independent Socialist Party to form the new Republican Socialist Unity Party. The party continued to operate as a separate party within the PURS.
