= Daniel Salamanca =

President of Bolivia from 1931 to 1934

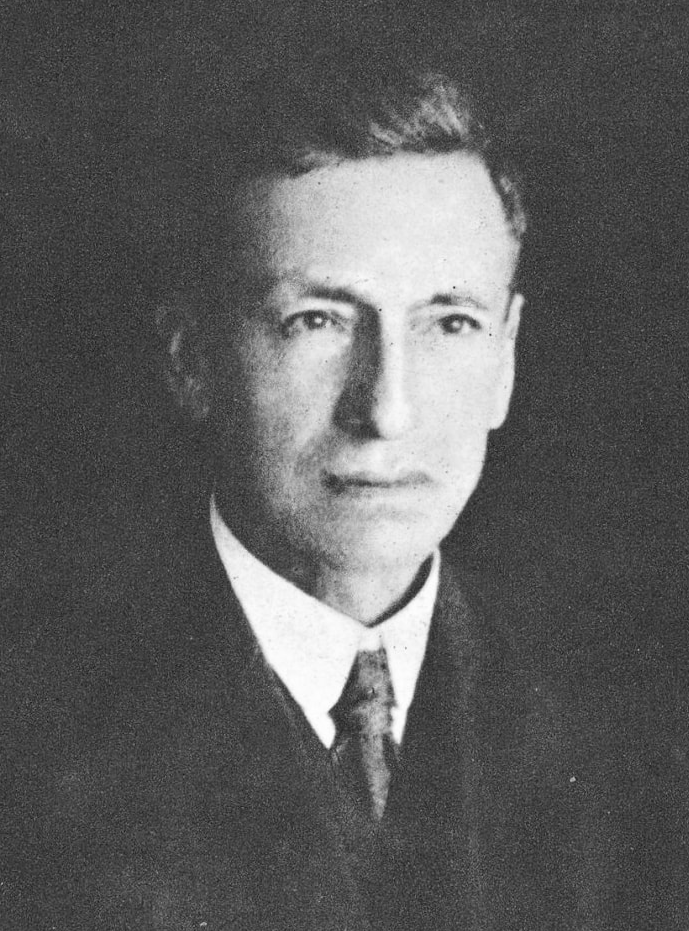
- Portrait of Salamanca, c. 1931

33rd President of Bolivia
- In office 5 March 1931 – 1 December 1934
- Vice President: José Luis Tejada
- Preceded by: Carlos Blanco Galindo
- Succeeded by: José Luis Tejada

Minister of Finance and Industry
- In office 27 October 1903 – 15 April 1904
- President: José Manuel Pando
- Preceded by: Ignacio Calderón
- Succeeded by: Fidel Valdez

Personal details
- Born: Daniel Domingo Salamanca Urey; 8 July 1869 Cochabamba, Bolivia
- Died: 17 July 1935 (aged 66) Cochabamba, Bolivia
- Party: Genuine Republican (1921–1935)
- Other political affiliations: Liberal (until 1914); Republican (1914–1921)
- Spouse: Sara de Ugarte Quiroga (m. 1893; died 1925)
- Parents: José Domingo Salamanca Zambrana; Manuela Urey Ferrufino
- Education: Higher University of San Simón
- Occupation: Lawyer; politician

Daniel Domingo Salamanca Urey (8 July 1869 – 17 July 1935) was a Bolivian lawyer and politician who served as the 33rd president of Bolivia from 1931 to 1934.

He was overthrown in a coup d'état on 27 November 1934, during the country's disastrous Chaco War with Paraguay. Bolivian historians have referred to him as "El Hombre Símbolo" (the symbolic man), as a president who carefully cultivated an appearance of integrity and nationalism.

== Political career ==
Born in Cochabamba, Salamanca studied law at the Higher University of San Simón, before being elected to Bolivia's Chamber of Deputies in 1899 for the Liberal Party. Two years later, President José Manuel Pando appointed him Finance Minister. Salamanca was a prominent opposition leader in 1907 and roundly attacked the Pinilla-Soler Treaty that had divided the Chaco region between Bolivia and Paraguay. Salamanca eventually split with the Liberals, however, and helped to found the new Republican Party, running unsuccessfully for Vice-President in 1917. Following the split of a faction opposed to the growing (some would say ruthless) ambitions of Republican leader Bautista Saavedra, the ascetic, professorial Salamanca founded, with a number of other men including Juan Maria Escalier, the so-called Genuine Republican Party (Partido Republicano Genuino). Salamanca himself ran for president on the Genuino ticket in the elections of 1925, but lost to Saavedra's handpicked successor, Hernando Siles.

Shaken by his defeats, Salamanca retired from politics and dedicated himself to teaching law. In the aftermath of the military overthrow of Hernando Siles in 1930, largely as a result of the Great Depression, Salamanca was asked to head a Republicano Genuino-Liberal coalition, with him at the head of the ticket and Liberal leader José Luis Tejada as his vice-presidential running mate. Salamanca was elected and took office in March 1931.

== Presidency ==
Immediately upon assuming office, Salamanca introduced an unpopular austerity program and clamped down on political opposition to his government. In what was likely a measure to avert public attention to the economic problems still facing the country, he also revived hostilities with Paraguay in the disputed Chaco region. Indeed, Salamanca had been for a long time one of the "hawks" in Bolivian politics, advocating firmness against Paraguay in the territorial dispute. Upon taking office, his motto became "We must stand firm in the Chaco." Given that the parched region of the Gran Chaco (largely uninhabited) had been under dispute between Bolivia and Paraguay ever since the creation of both republics, each proceeded to establish a line of small garrisons (fortines), simply to establish a national presence and press their claims. Sporadic battles would occur, but cooler heads tended to prevail, especially because neither Bolivia nor Paraguay (the only landlocked and poorest countries in South America) could afford a full-scale war over the Chaco. Neither, however, relinquished much in their claim to the entire Chaco region either.

All of this changed when oil was found on the foothills of the Andes, deep in Bolivian territory. It was then widely assumed that the nearby Chaco also contained oil, possibly in vast quantities. In addition, the explosive economic and political situation prompted President Salamanca to use the dispute to shore up national unity and distract attention from his government's shortcomings. He ordered a stepped-up effort at establishing more fortines wherever Paraguay was not established already. A Bolivian army exploration unit was sent deep into the Chaco early in 1932, whereupon they chanced to find a large lake in the middle of the desert-like scrubland. It was a perfect location for a permanent garrison. However, the lake—named Pitiantutá by the Paraguayans—turned out to be occupied by the Paraguayan military. Upon the arrival of the Bolivian expedition, a battle ensued and the Paraguayan troops fled. This, in essence, started the disastrous Chaco War (1932–1935).

The quick escalation of the war only exacerbated already severe economic problems in Bolivia (and in Paraguay), while causing many thousands of casualties. To make matters worse, Salamanca had very poor relations with the Bolivian high command from the beginning of the conflict, when he demoted a Bolivian general and placed the German Hans Kundt at the head of the country's armed forces at war. Kundt had led a military mission to Bolivia prior to World War I. A string of devastating defeats on the southern front of the war at the hands of the Paraguayans, who knew the terrain much better than the Bolivians (most of whom hailed from the Altiplano Highlands) precipitated Kundt's replacement by General Enrique Peñaranda at the end of 1933. Salamanca's relationship with the general only got worse, as the mercurial president (then in his mid 60s) tended to blame the military leadership for the continuing setbacks on the field. Things came to a head when Salamanca decided to replace Peñaranda and a number of his increasingly mutinous commandants.

== Coup ==
On 27 November 1934, the Bolivian generals deposed Salamanca while he visited their headquarters at Villamontes to explain the reasons for the changes. Peñaranda and his coconspirators (Colonel David Toro, Major Germán Busch, and others) in the end decided to keep democratic appearances intact, and replaced Salamanca with his Vice President, the decidedly more pliable José Luis Tejada Sorzano of the Liberal Party. It has been alleged that Tejada was in on the plot itself.

The elderly and sickly Salamanca at that point was allowed to "retire" to his native Cochabamba, where he died of stomach cancer less than a year later in July 1935, only days after the establishment of the ceasefire. A highly controversial figure, he was blamed by many for the war, while others respected him enormously as a man who did all he could to maintain his country's foothold on the Chaco without resorting to warfare but was betrayed by a mutinous and incompetent military high command. The rather dour, intellectual Salamanca is perhaps best remembered by two celebrated phrases of his: musing upon one of the many disastrous losses of his armies, he is reported to have said "I gave them everything they asked for – weapons, trucks, whatever they wanted; the one and only thing I could not give them was brains." He is also supposed to have remarked dryly to Peñaranda, upon the encirclement of the house where he was staying at Villamontes during the coup: "Congratulations General; you just completed your first and only successful military siege of the entire war."

== Personal life ==
Salamanca married the poet Sara Ugarte de Salamanca and they had five children: Laura, Raquel, Leonor, Hernan, and Rafael. His daughters Leonor and Raquel founded the Sociedad Patriótica de Señoras during the Chaco War.

Salamanca came from a wealthy, landed family from Cochabamba. At the time of expropriation in 1941, the Salamanca family owned the Chapisirca Lakes; Daniel Salamanca had inherited the lakes, the adjoining Chapisirca ranch, and the Montesillo hacienda from his father Jorge in 1904. From his mother Manuela, he inherited shares in the Colón beer factory, and rights to the Marquina Lakes in 1928. Under the 1906 Bolivian water laws, Salamanca inherited these water sources as accessories to his landed properties.

== Bibliography ==
- Alvéstegui, David: Salamanca, su gravitación sobre el destino de Bolivia. Vols. 1 - 4. Editorial Canelas S. A., 1957 - 1970
- Antezana Villagrán, Jorge:La Guerra del Chaco. Vol. 2. Editorial Calama. 1979
- Cespedes, Augusto: Salamanca o el metafisico del fracaso. Editorial "Juventud", 1973
- Dunkerley, James: Orígenes del poder militar: Bolivia 1879-1935. Quipus, 1987.
- Querejazu Calvo, Roberto: Llallagua: historia de una montaña. Cochabamba-La Paz (Bolivia): Los Amigos del Libro, 1977.
- Querejazu Calvo, Roberto: Historia de la Guerra del Chaco. La Paz (Bolivia): Editorial "Juventud", 1990.
- Querejazu Calvo, Roberto: Masamaclay. Historia política, diplomática y militar de la guerra del Chaco. Cochabamba-La Paz (Bolivia): Los Amigos del Libro, 1981.

Political offices
Preceded by Ignacio Calderón	Minister of Finance and Industry; 1903–1904	Succeeded by Fidel Valdez
Preceded by Carlos Blanco Galindo	President of Bolivia; 1931–1934	Succeeded by José Luis Tejada
