= 1942 Bolivian legislative election =

Parliamentary elections were held in Bolivia in May 1942 to elect members of the National Congress.

== Results ==
Party	Votes	%	Seats					
Party	Votes	%	Chamber			Senate		
Party	Votes	%	Elected	Total	+/–	Elected	Total	+/–
Liberal Party				25	+4		9	0
United Socialist Party				22	+4		4	0
Socialist Republican Party				20	+8		11	0
Genuine Republican Party				13	–4		3	0
Revolutionary Left Party				6	New	0	0	New
Revolutionary Nationalist Movement				5	New	0	0	New
MNR Independents				5	New	0	0	New
Workers Socialist Party of Bolivia				1	0	0	0	0
Workers' Party of Tarija				1	New	0	0	New
PSU Independents				1	New	0	0	New
PIR Independents				1	New	0	0	New
FSB Independents				1	0	0	0	0
Independents				9	–10	0	0	0
Total			56	110	+1	9	27	0
Source: Bustillos et al.

== See also ==
- Bolivian National Congress, 1942–1944
