= Bolivian National Congress, 1942–1944 =

The Bolivian National Congress 1942–1944 was elected in March 1942.

== Chamber of Senators ==
Senator	Party	Department
Adolfo Vilar	PL	Chuquisaca
Alberto Saavedra Nogales	PRS	Potosí
Alfredo Jordán	PL	Santa Cruz
Arturo Galindo	PL	Cochabamba
Bernardo Navajas Trigo	PL	Tarija
Carlos Beltrán Morales	PSU	Oruro
Crisanto Valverde	PL	Beni
Edmundo Vásquez	PRS	Oruro
Fabián Vaca Chávez	PRG	Pando
Félix Capriles	PSU	Cochabamba
Gilfredo Cortés Candía	PSU	Beni
José Gil Soruco	PRS	Santa Cruz
Juan Manuel Balcázar	PRS	Potosí
Julio Céspedes Añez	PRS	Beni
Julio Pantoja Estenssoro	PRS	Tarija
Julio Quintanilla	PL	Oruro
Justo Rodas Eguino	PRS	La Paz
Luis Calvo	PRG	Potosí
Mamerto Urriolagoitia	PSU	Chuquisaca
Manuel Carrasco J.	PL	Cochabamba
Manuel Mogro Moreno	PRS	Tarija
Oscar Mariaca Pando	PL	Pando
Pedro Zilveti Arce	PRS	Chuquisaca
Rómulo Araño Peredo	PRS	Pando
Rubén Terrazas	PRG	Santa Cruz
Tomás Manuel Elio	PL	La Paz
Waldo Belmonte Pool	PRS	La Paz

== Chamber of Deputies ==
Deputy	Party	Department
Abel Leyes	PSU	Oruro
Abel Pacheco	PL	La Paz
Abel Reyes Ortiz	PSU	Beni
Abelardo Alcázar	PRS	La Paz
Abelardo Villalpando Retamozo	PIR	Potosí
Abraham Bascopé	PRG	Cochabamba
Adrián Barrientos Franco	PL	Santa Cruz
Agustín Zuleta	PSU	Potosí
Alberto Mendoza López	MNR	La Paz
Alberto Salinas López	PSU	Chuquisaca
Alberto Sánchez Rossel	POT	Tarija
Alfonso Claros	ind	Cochabamba
Alfredo Arana Urioste	PRS	Chuquisaca
Alfredo Arratia	PIR	Potosí
Alfredo Mendizábal	PIR	Cochabamba
Alfredo Mollinedo	PSU	La Paz
Angel Mendizábal	PL	Oruro
Antonio Pizarro Gómez	PL	Potosí
Antonio Velasco Avila	ind	Beni
Armando Montesinos	PRS	La Paz
Arturo Pinto Escalier	PRG	Potosí
Atilio Molina Pantoja	PL	Tarija
Carlos López Arce	PRG	Tarija
Celso Castedo	PRS	Santa Cruz
Ciro Félix Trigo	PSU	Tarija
Cleómedes Blanco Galindo	PL	Cochabamba
Cornelio Fernández	PL	Potosí
Daniel Gamarra	PRG	Chuquisaca
Daniel Iriarte	PRG	Cochabamba
Demetrio Canelas	PRG	Oruro
Eduardo del Portillo	ind (FSB)	Potosí
Eduardo Messuti Roca	PSU	Pando
Enrique Baldivieso	PSU	Chuquisaca
Ernesto Monasterios	PRG	Santa Cruz
Eugenio Gómez	PRS	La Paz
Facundo Flores Jiménez	PSU	Santa Cruz
Felipe Ayala Gamboa	PSU	Cochabamba
Felipe Baldomar	ind (PIR)	Santa Cruz
Fernando Campero Alvarez	PSU	Pando
Fernando Iturralde Chinel	MNR	La Paz
Fernando Loayza Beltrán	ind	Oruro
Fidel Iriarte	PL	Cochabamba
Florencio Candia	PSU	Cochabamba
Francisco Lazcano Soruco	PSU	Tarija
Gabriel Moisés T.	PIR	Oruro
Germán Chávez	PL	Pando
Guillermo Bocángel	PRS	La Paz
Guillermo Liendo	PRS	Oruro
Gustavo A. Navarro	PSOB	Chuquisaca
Gustavo Auzza	PRS	Chuquisaca
Gustavo Chacón	ind	Beni
Héctor Pino Ichazo	ind (MNR)	Tarija
Héctor Suárez Santisteban	PRS	Santa Cruz
Hernán Siles Zuazo	ind (MNR)	La Paz
Horacio Sosa	PL	Santa Cruz
Huáscar Chávez	PRS	Beni
Hugo O'Connor D'Arlach	PL	Tarija
Hugo Salmón Tapia	ind (MNR)	Pando
Humberto Duchén	PL	Potosí
Humberto Ríos Zambrana	PIR	Cochabamba
Jacinto Rodríguez	PL	Oruro
Jesús Lijerón Rodríguez	ind	Beni
Jorge Aráoz Campero	ind (MNR)	Tarija
José Chávez Suárez	PL	Beni
José Parada Suárez	PL	Santa Cruz
José Saavedra Suárez	PSU	Santa Cruz
Juan B. Arze	ind	La Paz
Juan Granier Chirveches	PL	Pando
Juan José Carrasco	PRS	Cochabamba
Julio Agudo	PRG	La Paz
Julio Harriague	PL	Chuquisaca
Julio Landívar Moreno	PL	Santa Cruz
Julio Tumiri Javier	ind	Potosí
Julio Zuazo Cuenca	PSU	La Paz
Lucio Lanza Solares	PRS	Potosí
Luis Ossio Ruiz	PSU	Potosí
Luis Ponce Lozada	PRG	Cochabamba
Luis Saavedra Suárez	PSU	Santa Cruz
Macedonio Ascarrunz	PRS	Potosí
Miguel Camargo	PRS	Beni
Miguel Mercado Moreira	PL	Potosí
Miguel Muñoz	PRG	Chuquisaca
Nazario Pardo Valle	PSU	La Paz
Néstor V. Galindo	PL	Cochabamba
Pablo H. Ascimani	PSU	Beni
Pedro Montaño	PRG	Santa Cruz
Rafael Alarcón Pacheco	PRG	Chuquisaca
Rafael Otazo V.	MNR	La Paz
Rafael Tufiño	PL	Potosí
Raúl Ramos	ind	Oruro
Raúl Romero Linares	PSU	Chuquisaca
Remy Rodas Eguino	PRS	La Paz
Ricardo Anaya Arze	PIR	Cochabamba
Roberto Jordán Cuéllar	PSU	Pando
Roberto Prudencio	MNR	Pando
Rodolfo Soriano	ind (PSU)	Cochabamba
Rogelio Arce	PL	Chuquisaca
Rolando Rivero Torres	PRS	Cochabamba
Saturnino Avila	PL	Chuquisaca
Sócrates Parada Suárez	PL	Beni
Teodomiro Urquiola	PRS	La Paz
Tomás Chávez Lobatón	ind	La Paz
Urbano Escóbar	PL	Cochabamba
Víctor Andrade	ind (MNR)	La Paz
Víctor Paz Estenssoro	MNR	Tarija
Virgilio Serrate	PRG	Santa Cruz
Wálker Humérez	PRS	Cochabamba
Wálter Dalence	PRS	Potosí
Wenceslao G. Velasco	PRS	La Paz

PL – Liberal Party

MNR – Revolutionary Nationalist Movement

PIR – Revolutionary Left Party

PSOB – Socialist Workers' Party of Bolivia

PSU – United Socialist Party

POT – Workers' Party of Tarija

PRS – Socialist Republican Party

PRG – Genuine Republican Party

FSB – Bolivian Socialist Falange.

ind – independents
