= 1947 Bolivian general election =

General elections were held in Bolivia on 5 January 1947, electing both a new President of the Republic and a new National Congress.

== Results ==
=== President ===
Candidate	Party	Votes	%
Enrique Hertzog	Republican Socialist Unity Party	44,077	47.22
Luis Fernando Guachalla	Antifascist Democratic Front	43,634	46.75
Víctor Paz Estenssoro	Mining Parliamentary Bloc	5,194	5.56
Félix Tavera	Independent	433	0.46
Total		93,338	100.00
Registered voters/turnout		128,982	–
Source: Gamboa

=== Vice President ===
Candidate	Party	Votes	%
Mamerto Urriolagoitía	Republican Socialist Unity Party	43,765	48.24
Guillermo Francovich	Antifascist Democratic Front	43,423	47.87
Juan Lechín Oquendo	Mining Parliamentary Bloc	1,620	1.79
Rafael Otazo	Independent	1,907	2.10
Total		90,715	100.00
Registered voters/turnout		128,982	–
Source: Gamboa

=== Congress ===
Party	Seats	
Party	Chamber	Senate
Republican Socialist Unity Party	45	14
Revolutionary Left Party	36	4
Liberal Party	16	7
Revolutionary Nationalist Movement	4	1
Revolutionary Workers' Party	3	1
Social Democratic Party	2	0
BSF Independents	1	0
Independents	4	0
Total	111	27
Source: Political Handbook of the World 1948
