= 1946 La Paz riots =

Series of protests, general strikes, and riots in Bolivia

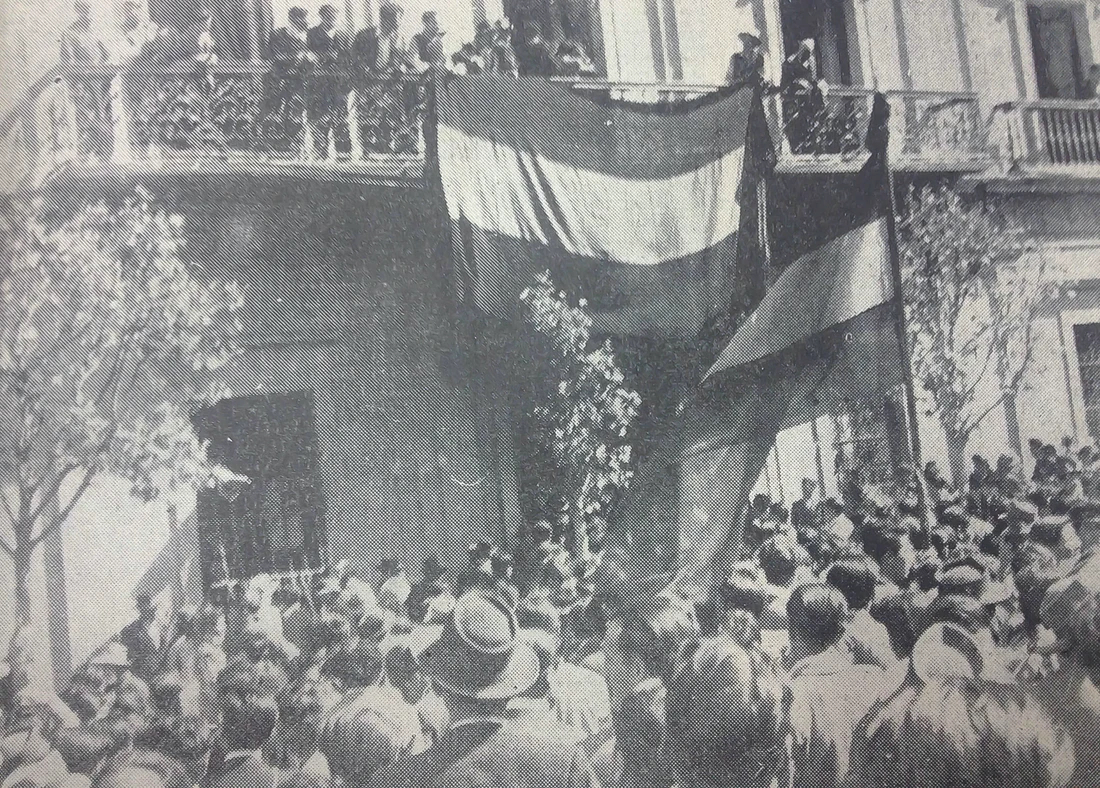
- Protesters hang a Bolivian flag outside a government building
- Date: 8–21 July 1946
- Location: La Paz, Bolivia
- Caused by: Political repression by the government, teachers' wage strikes
- Methods: General strikes, riots, shootouts, stone throwing, lynching, rebellion
- Result: Removal of the MNR from government; Resignation and later death of Gualberto Villarroel; Interim junta assumes control of the government; Summoning of new elections on 5 January 1947

Parties
Bolivian government: RADEPA; Revolutionary Nationalist Movement; Municipal police; Armed Forces of Bolivia (until 20 Jul. 1946) (Note: The majority of chief officers of the armed forces requested on 20 July that Villarroel present his resignation to calm the situation. As the crisis worsened, soldiers of the "Loa", "Lanza", and "Sucre" Regiments joined the rioting students. Some elements of the military, such as the Palacio Quemado guard, generally remained loyal to the government.); Pro-government protesters	Opposition groups: Revolutionary Left Party; Teachers' Confederation; Trade Union Confederation of Bolivian Workers; Armed Forces of Bolivia (from 20 Jul. 1946); UMSA students; Anti-government protesters

Lead figures
Gualberto Villarroel †; Víctor Paz Estenssoro; Edmundo Nogales	UMSA students and professors

Casualties and losses
- Dead: 130; Injured: 200+

A series of increasingly violent general strikes and protests occurred in La Paz, Bolivia, between 8 and 21 July 1946 and culminated in the lynching and hanging of President Gualberto Villarroel. What started as teachers' strikes demanding increased wages quickly escalated as university students, organized labor workers, and civilians clashed with municipal police and armed, pro-government civilians. By the end, interim control of the country was handed to a junta of representatives of the three striking groups chaired by independent magistrates of the Superior Court of Justice of the judicial district of La Paz.

== The July Crisis ==
=== Background ===
Since its assumption to power in December 1943, the government of President Gualberto Villarroel and his collaborators in the Revolutionary Nationalist Movement (MNR) and the Reason for the Fatherland (RADEPA) military lodge had gradually eroded its initial reformist popularity through continuous and violent repression of members of the opposition, newspapers, and citizens critical of its actions. The most vile incident came in November 1944 when a group of arrested coup-plotters were executed without trial, being thrown to the bottom of a ravine near Chuspipata and Challacollo.

Dissatisfaction reached its peak in July 1946. The most recent crisis came when the teachers in La Paz, whose wages at the time sat at a meager $12.50 to $20 a month, went on strike on 8 July, demanding a salary increase. The government refused, stating that an increase in wages would cause inflation. This, despite the fact that an estimated 56% of the national budget was being spent on the army alone. On 10 July, students of the Higher University of San Andrés (UMSA) staged their own protests in support of the teachers. The police dispersed the demonstration concentrated in the Plaza Murillo with rifle and machine gun fire, leaving 3 dead and 11 wounded. The burial of the dead the following day inspired new rallies which resulted in more casualties.

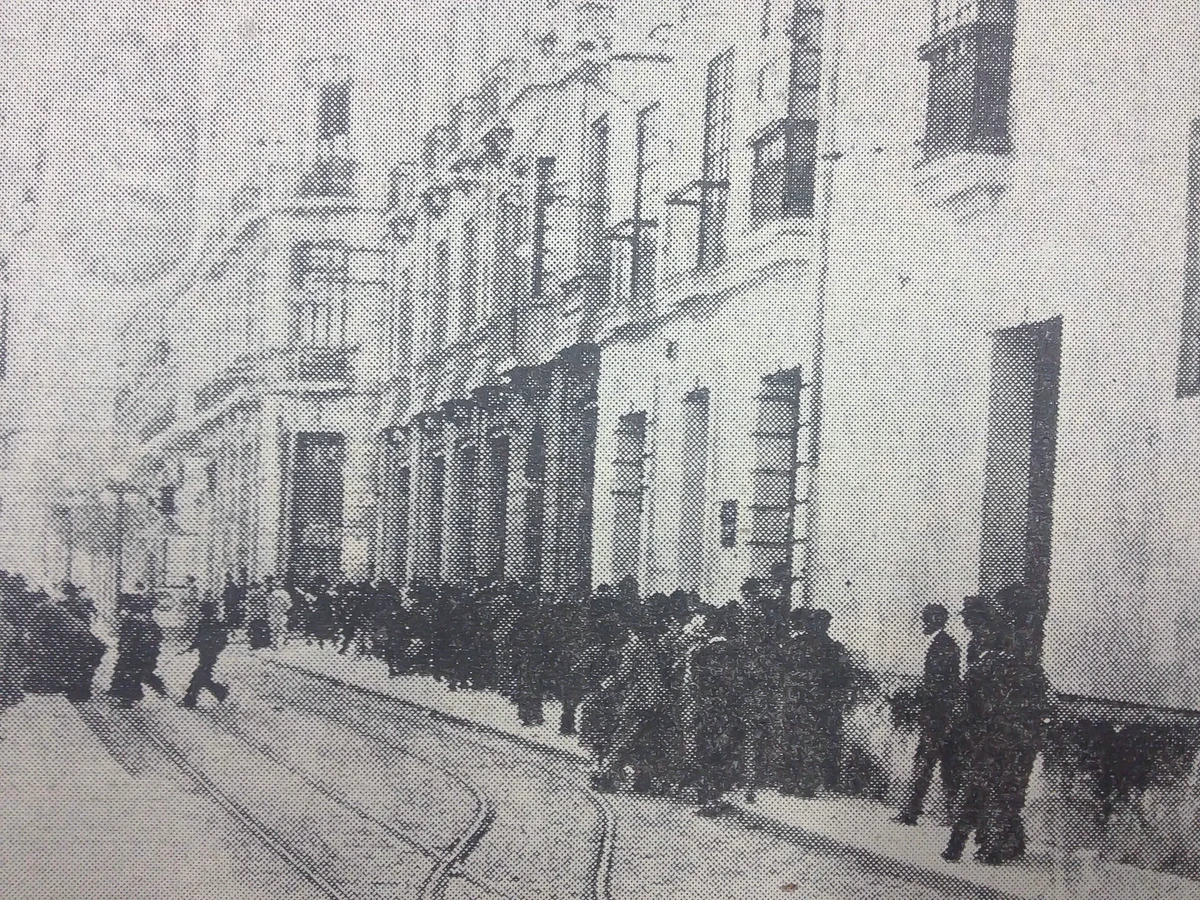
The mobilized people enter Plaza Murillo little by little from Calle Ballivián.

=== Stoning of the UMSA ===
The increasingly tense situation caused the government to suspend 16 July festivities celebrating the civic anniversary of La Paz. That night and in the early hours of 17 July, a group of twenty MNR members led by the minister of agriculture, Julio Zuazo Cuenca, stoned the UMSA, smashing its windows with rifles and rocks. Although the rest of the city was heavily guarded, eyewitnesses recounted that there was not one policeman or soldier in sight during the half-hour-long attack.

The gesture galvanized university students who visited different neighborhoods and rallied La Paz citizens of all social sectors to their side. The crowd converged in the city center where shouts of "Down with the MNR!" and "Down with the military boot!" were levied at the Palacio Quemado, the government palace. Minor outbreaks of shootings broke out in some areas with rioters firing at the Calama Regiment barracks and the traffic section near the Rodríguez market. During one rally, police shot and killed Bergel Camberos, a student of the Pedro Domingo Murillo Industrial School.

=== Turning point ===
That afternoon, MNR leadership expelled Zuazo Cuenca from the party for his role in leading the attack against the university. However, on 18 July, the government issued morning press denied the official statement announcing Zuazo Cuenca's expulsion from the party. At around 6 a.m., police attempted to forcefully enter the UMSA despite their presence being officially banned by the university's autonomy. They were, however, blocked by students with small arms who barricaded the entrances. Tensions finally reached their height at around 10 a.m. when sporadic shooting and violence between police and students broke out. Despite the police focus on the students, little more than a dozen of the roughly 400 demonstrators were armed. Further, shortly after the shooting started, pro-government civilians armed with rifles were allowed into the city. The students now demanded the removal from the Cabinet of all members of the MNR. At 11 a.m., the high command of the MNR summoned its members to the Legislative Palace to assess the precarious situation. By noon, all streets in the city center were rendered too dangerous to traverse and what few businesses that had been open in the morning were closed. That day, the first clashes took place in the transit building, causing 10 casualties.

By the afternoon, the army, which up until then had remained relatively distant from the situation, had begun to play an increasingly important role. At this point, however, it was under instructions to fire only defensively or in the occasion that important properties such as the market had been occupied by students. In a bid to disperse the growing crowds, Villarroel ordered the Loa 4th Infantry Regiment and the Bolívar 2nd Artillery Regiment to march into the city. Speaking on the radio, Villarroel assured that the government was in full control of the situation and blamed the riots on the Rosca, the capitalist mining enterprises.

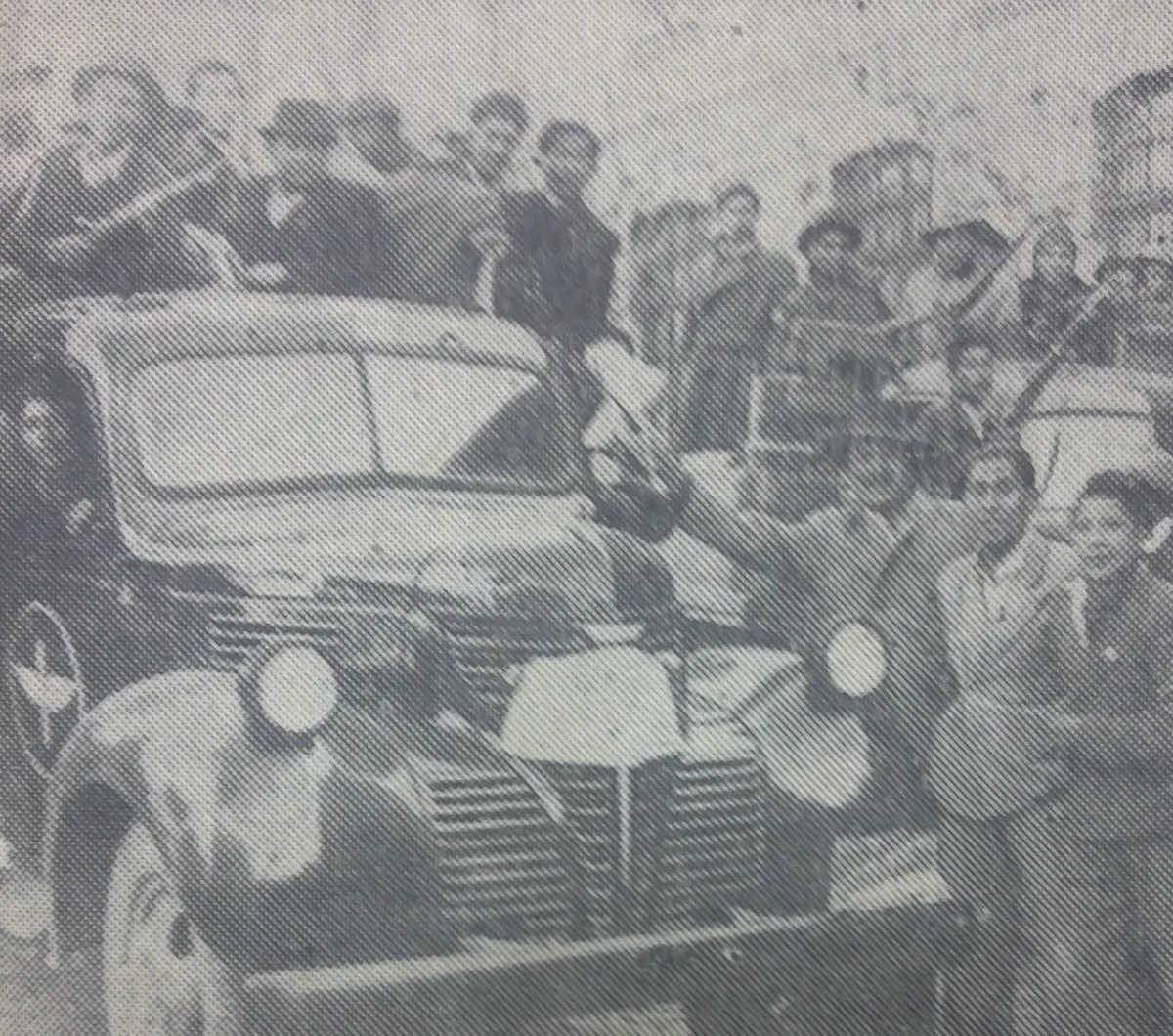
Armed citizens arrived from Oruro to join the revolt in La Paz

United States Ambassador Joseph Flack described the situation from his vantage point in the U.S. Embassy: "We feel that we are in the middle of a war and it is impossible for anyone to leave the building". Flack also protested that two armed policemen had invaded the embassy in order to set machine guns up on the roof. That night, Flack, along with the Brazilian ambassador Renato de Lacerda Lago, Peruvian ambassador Eduardo Garland Roel, Ecuadorian minister Hugo Moncayo, and papal chargé Gastón Mojaisky met with the acting foreign minister, Colonel José Celestino Pinto, in order to urge clemency for the students, something which Pinto suggested the president would be sympathetic to. The meeting with the foreign delegates was followed by a meeting between Villarroel and the rector of the UMSA, Héctor Ormachea, after which the president ordered that all university students arrested in the clashes be released.

The night of 18 July saw heavy snowfall cover the city. At 1:30 p.m. on 19 July, in a single column, the Loa Regiment and the Lanza 5th Regiment of Cavalry descended on La Paz with orders to occupy some corners of the city. Municipal police had disappeared from sight, replaced entirely by troops. During a demonstration at the Plaza Murillo, two revolver shots were fired at the army chiefs who were standing on the balcony of the Palacio Quemado. One bullet grazed Colonel Francisco Barrero while another hit Colonel Pinto in the leg. A fraction of the Loa was ordered to march towards the Plaza Murillo but upon arrival, it could be seen that the organized demonstration was dissolving, so the intervention of the military was no longer necessary. By the afternoon, Flack described the Plaza Murillo as having become "an armed camp with light and heavy machine guns emplaced and several lend lease anti-aircraft pieces at strategic points with their muzzles depressed to body height". At 6 p.m., demonstrators attempted to reenter the Plaza Murillo. Despite Pinto's motion to the troops not to fire, shooting nonetheless broke out with grave casualties among both the protesters and the soldiers. The battle ended when the demonstrators withdrew. A radio statement later announced that thirty-two men had been arrested in the Hotel Paris for having fired into the crowd in order to inculpate the government.

=== MNR resigns ===
The railway workers had now joined the students, issuing an ultimatum demanding the removal of the MNR from Villarroel's cabinet. Some fairly important workers' syndicates had also called their own general strikes. Given the situation, Villarroel was advised to separate his government from the MNR in order to reassure the country. The five military ministers (Gustavo Chacó of foreign affairs, Edmundo Nogales of government, José Celestino Pinto of defense, Antonio Ponce of public works, and Jorge Calero of education) all submitted their resignations in order to pressure the three of the MNR (Víctor Paz Estenssoro of finance, Germán Monroy Block of labor, and Julio Zuazo Cuenca of agriculture) to do the same. However, they refused to follow suit. In a meeting between Villarroel and Paz Estenssoro, the latter affirmed that the president's decision to request the MNR's resignation was an "ingratitude and a betrayal" and expressed his fear that "persecution against us will begin". In the end, Paz Estenssoro agreed to submit the MNR's resignation the following day in exchange for safety guarantees. At 10 p.m., a radio statement announced the president's intent to form a new, all-military cabinet.

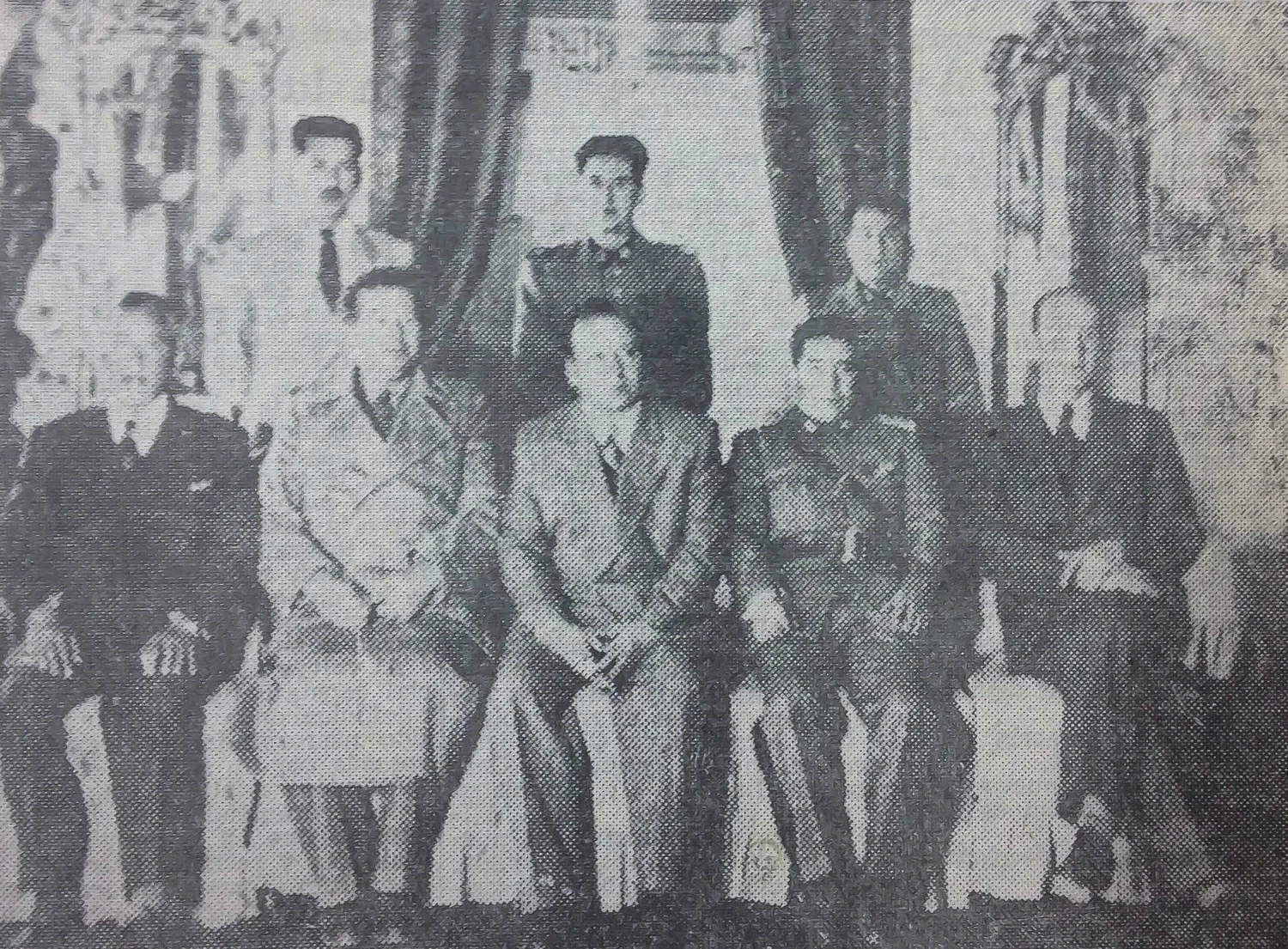
The last living photo taken of Villarroel presenting his new cabinet, 20 July 1946

On the morning of 20 July, Zuazo Cuenca, Monroy Block, and La Paz mayor Juan Luis Gutiérrez Granier met at the home of Paz Estenssoro. There was a delay in the drafting of the MNR resignation and it would not officially arrive until 7 p.m. However, before even receiving it, the president appointed a new cabinet made up of one general, three colonels, three lieutenant colonels and a major. However, dissatisfaction continued due to the fact that at least two of the new military ministers were MNR supporters. On the contrary, the new cabinet aroused misgivings in a sector which had so far been loyal to the Villarroel regime: the armed forces. Among soldiers and officials in the Ministry of Defense, the general staff, as well as the Sucre and Loa regiments, there was resentment at the fact that full control of the army and now the government had been singularly handed to a few members of the RADEPA lodge. The opinion increasingly grew that the president should resign.

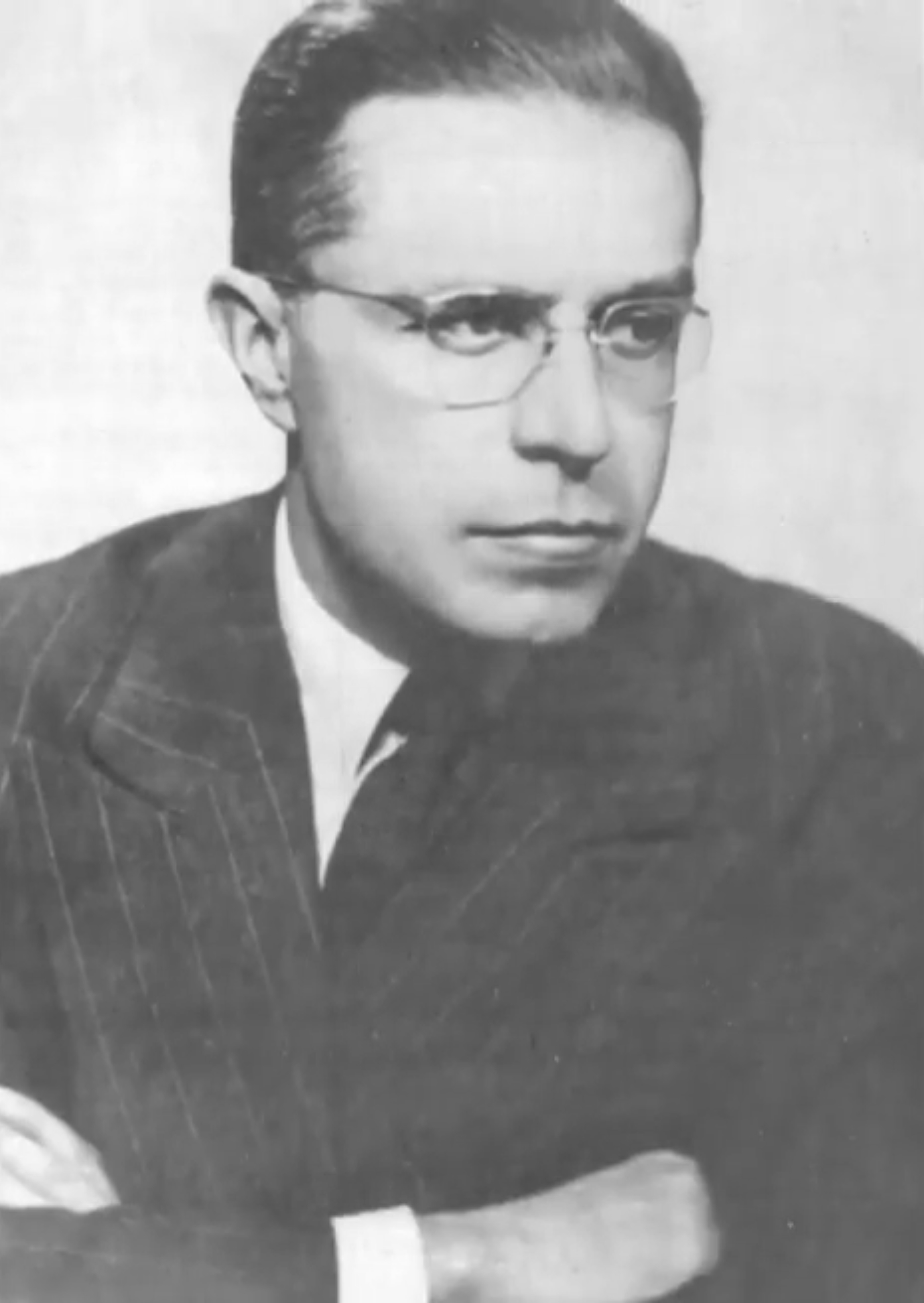
Víctor Paz Estenssoro, Minister of Finance and Chief of the MNR.

=== Army intervention ===
At 8 p.m., the commanders of the Lanza and the Sucre regiments as well as the commander of the Military Geographical Institute met in the general staff and submitted a formal request that the President resign from office. At the end of the meeting, the newly appointed minister of defense, General Ángel Rodríguez, took these commanders to the Palacio Quemado to personally deliver their request to Villarroel. At 11 p.m., Rodríguez made Villarroel known of the military's request for his resignation. According to Rodríguez: "The president did not expect this coup. His bewilderment was distressing, but he reacted immediately and with a calm attitude said: If I no longer have support, I am ready to resign. The presidency is a terrible burden." Villarroel summoned his cabinet and about 40 military chiefs and officers, representatives of all the military units and institutions of La Paz. The tense meeting lasted from 11 p.m. on the 20th to 3 a.m. on the 21st. At one point, the president's aide-de-camp, Captain Waldo Ballivián, burst into the room and pointed his revolver at Captain Milton López, accusing him of being a traitor for having called the general staff by telephone to request more military officers attend the meeting to impose a majority that would force Villarroel's resignation. Finally, President Villarroel agreed to resign with Vice President Julián Montellano as his successor. However, all those present rejected this because Montellano belonged to the MNR, and the people at that time did not want any hint of that party in government. The conclave ultimately dissolved with opinions entirely divided, though it was concluded that it would be difficult to maintain the president's situation without the full support of the army, taking into account that many of the troops who were quartered had relatives who had died in previous clashes.

=== Flight of the MNR ===
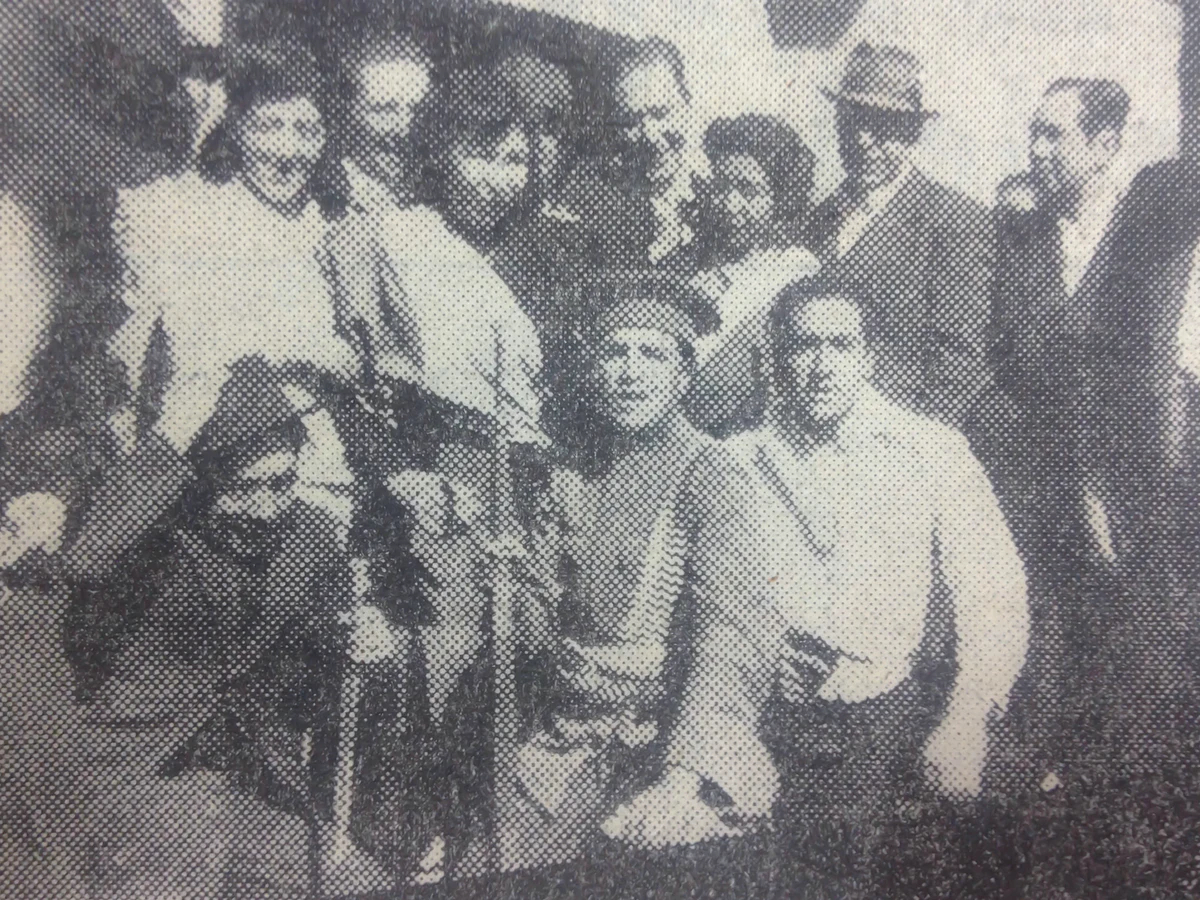
The soldiers who joined the revolt did so with the visors of their caps turned backwards

At around two or three in the morning of 21 July, the Mayor's Office was contacted by Undersecretary of the Presidency Luis Uría de la Oliva who communicated that the director general of transit, Major Max Toledo, urgently needed to speak with either Mayor Gutiérrez Granier or Paz Estenssoro. Toledo informed Paz Estenssoro that the armed forces remained divided and that it would make a communication in the morning. This was taken as confirmation that the military had turned against the government. Paz Estenssoro immediately dictated a set of telephone numbers to Block, which he wrote down on a piece of paper, and instructed him and Israel Camacho to go to the telephone exchange located in the same building as the Mayor's Office and cut off the Palacio Quemado phones from those of the general staff, the Defense Ministry, the Military Region, the Calama Regiment, the War Arsenal, and the police department. When the MNR deputy Alfonso Finot informed Paz Estenssoro that this could endanger Villarroel and Nogales, he replied "It doesn't matter, screw them. Let's go." After Monroy Block and Camacho completed their task of cutting off the palace telephones, the MNR abandoned the Mayor's Office to seek asylum. Though Granier attempted to lock the building with a chain, he was rushed by Paz Estenssoro and left it open.

=== Anarchy in La Paz ===
As the morning advanced, the previous days activities and demonstrations resumed. A group of these protesters discovered the unattended Mayor's Office and raided it, discovering weapons and ammunition stored there. After this, they moved their attention towards the General Directorate of Transit, with the intent of searching for more weapons. Upon their arrival around 9:30 a.m., they were met with resistance and shooting began at the Avenida Santa Cruz. At this point, tensions had reached critical mass and the riots and protests turned into a full-scale uprising. After the transit building fell, it was decided to attack the panopticon which was taken with little resistance. Political and common prisoners alike were freed and joined in the riot. As the unrest spread throughout the city, other buildings were occupied, including the Calama Regiment barracks, the Police School, the Investigations Office, Radio Illimani, the Ministry of Government, and the Military Institute, whose cadets joined the rebellion, turning the visors of their military caps back to show solidarity. They were joined later by Loa troops who did the same with their caps. None of the military units took to the streets to defend the regime. University students, meanwhile, opted to remove their uniform ties to identify themselves. As the demonstrations grew increasingly violent, Major Toledo, Director General of Transit and member of RADEPA, was murdered in the vicinity of Plaza San Pedro. His body became the first of many to be hung in the square, inspired by the hanging and desecration of the corpse of Benito Mussolini the year prior.

Amidst the chaos, U.S. Ambassador Flack urgently wired a short telegram that read: "Anarchy has broken loose in La Paz. Students and public have secured guns and ammunition from Municipal Palace and have attacked and taken traffic headquarters. No evidence of soldiers or police in streets. Please inform War and Justice Departments."

=== Villarroel resigns ===
As the city found itself in a state of chaos, the only relatively peaceful place was the Palacio Quemado. The palace was nearly empty, save for Villarroel, his aide Ballivián, undersecretary Uría, two or three ministers, the head of the Military House Colonel Luis Arce Pacheco, and Captain Ronald Monje Roca. In the morning, a delegation of aviators of the Bolivian Air Force arrived to escort Villarroel to the El Alto Air Base "where they would not allow a fly to bother him". From there, they intended to fly him to seek asylum in Arica, Chile. Although his staff implored him to go, Villarroel remained indecisive until Captain Juan Moreira convinced him: "My colonel, you have not slept for three days. Therefore, your mind is not in a position to discern all the dangers that surround you here." Villarroel had already bidden farewell to his collaborators and taken his coat when Colonel Nogales, his close friend and minister of government up until the day prior, expressed his opinion against the president's escape. After a few words with Captain Moreira, the airmen left without Villarroel.

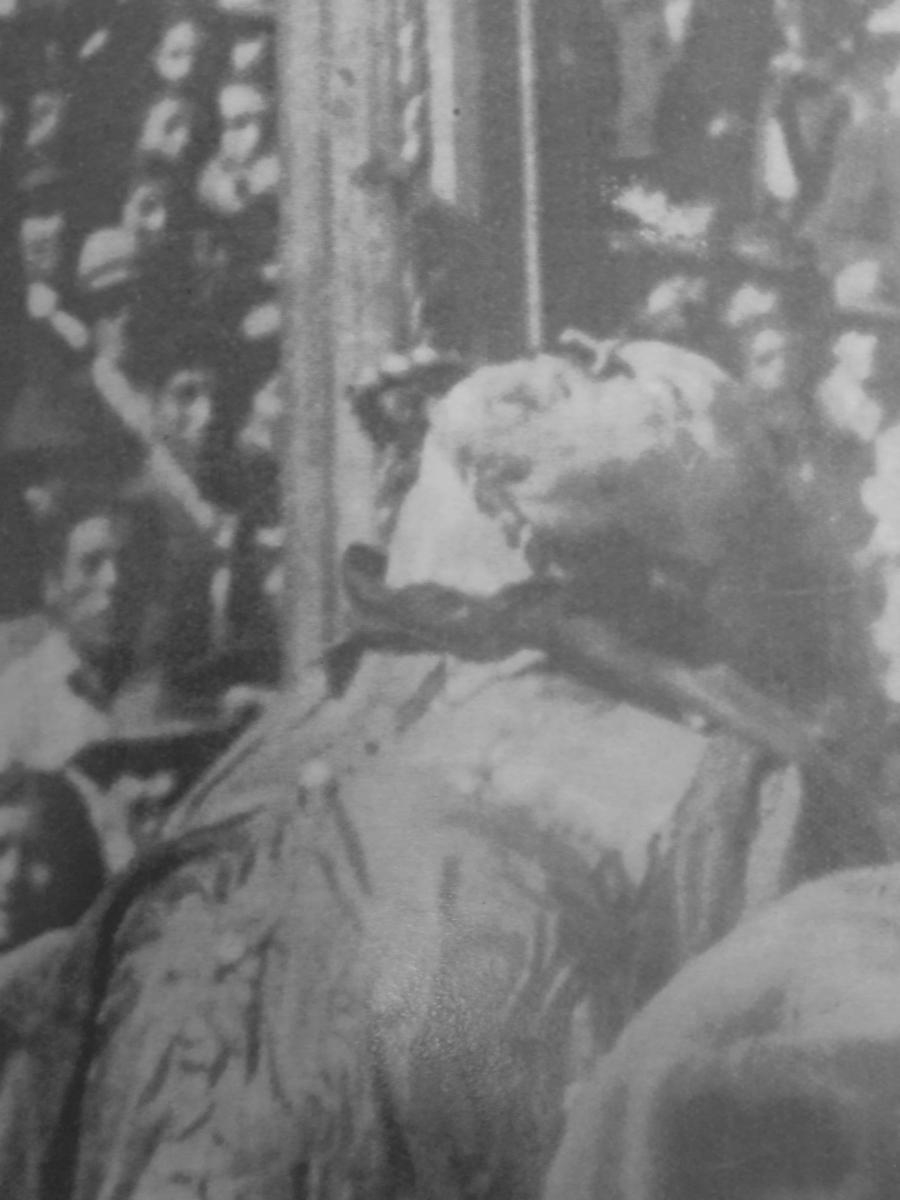
President Villarroel is lynched and hanged in Plaza Murillo

At around 11 a.m., Villarroel met with Eduardo Montes y Montes, the leader of the Liberal Party, who was an old friend and comrade in arms during the Chaco War. Montes later recounted that Villarroel asked him "What do you advise?" to which he replied: "That you resign, Mr. President". As Montes was leaving, Colonel Jorge Chávez informed him that the President was drafting his resignation and asked for him to stay and receive it. Montes waited for ten minutes before deciding to leave the building. Villarroel presented his resignation to General Dámaso Arenas, Commander-in-Chief of the Armed Forces. It read: "With the desire to contribute to the tranquillity of the country I resign from the position of Constitutional President of the Republic in the person of the Commander-in-Chief of the Armed Forces of the Nation". It is unclear whether Arenas was ever sworn in as president. At 1:30 p.m., Defense Minister Ángel Rodríguez issued an official statement announcing that Villarroel had resigned and that the government had been handed to a junta.

=== Siege of the Palacio Quemado ===
By that point, however, an easy end to the protests and riots through the President's resignation was no longer possible. Unaware of Villarroel's abdication, anti-government crowds took control of the Plaza Murillo, the site of the Palacio Quemado, laying siege to it. What few officials remained in the palace quickly dispersed. While searching for a way to get Villarroel out of the building through one of the neighboring rooftops, Colonel Arce Pacheco was shot through the belly, collapsing onto an interior courtyard.

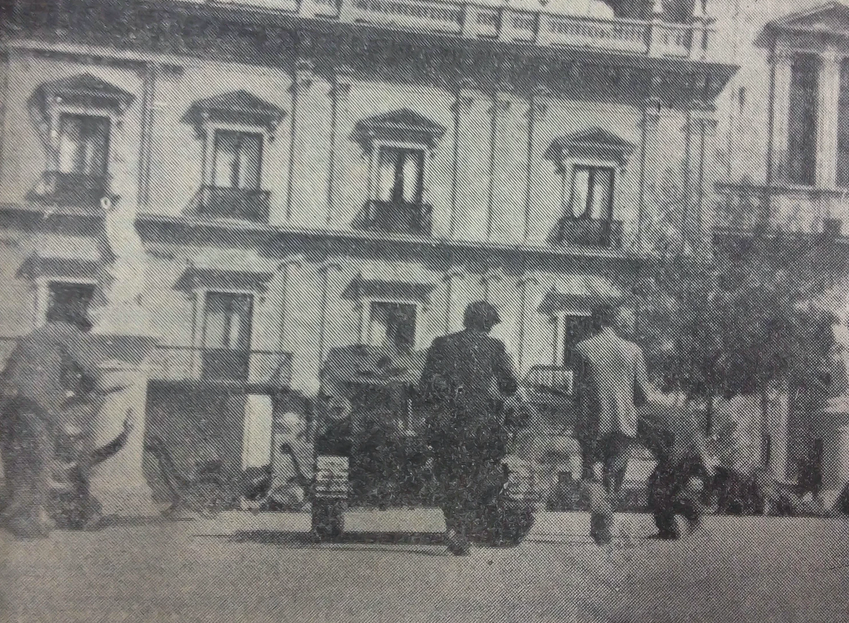
The attack begins on the Palacio Quemado, where Villarroel was.

The Palacio Quemado was only minimally defended with its usual guard of 24 soldiers from the Sucre Regiment under the command of Second Lieutenant Federico Lafaye Borda and a few troops from the Motorized School led by Captain Fidel Téllez. While their forces engaged in a firefight against the attackers, a tank from the Motorized School crashed through the palace gate. Whether its driver was attempting to escape or was sympathetic to the students' movement and had defected is uncertain though the revolutionaries believed the latter. The frenzied rioters stormed the Palacio Quemado in a murderous rage. Villarroel was discovered hiding in a cupboard in the Office of Reorganization and Administrative Efficiency, at the ground floor of the palace. There are several accounts of what happened next: One claim is that one of the revolutionaries fired his submachine gun through the closed cupboard door upon hearing a noise and discovered the mortally wounded body of Villarroel when he opened it. Another alleges that Villarroel opened the cupboard himself and fired his revolver at his attackers before falling, riddled with gunshots. A third version says that when discovered he exclaimed: "I am not Villarroel, I am Alfredo Mendizábal, head of the PIR (one of the leaders of the revolution)".

Whatever the case, Villarroel died within the Palacio Quemado at around 2:30 p.m. and his body was thrown through a window onto Ayacucho Street in the Plaza Murillo. Villarroel was then lynched in the street, his clothes torn, his body horribly mutilated, and his almost naked corpse hung on a lamppost. In the vicinity, Captain Ballivián, Undersecretary Uría, and the regime's press director, the journalist Roberto Hinojosa, met similar fates.

== Aftermath ==
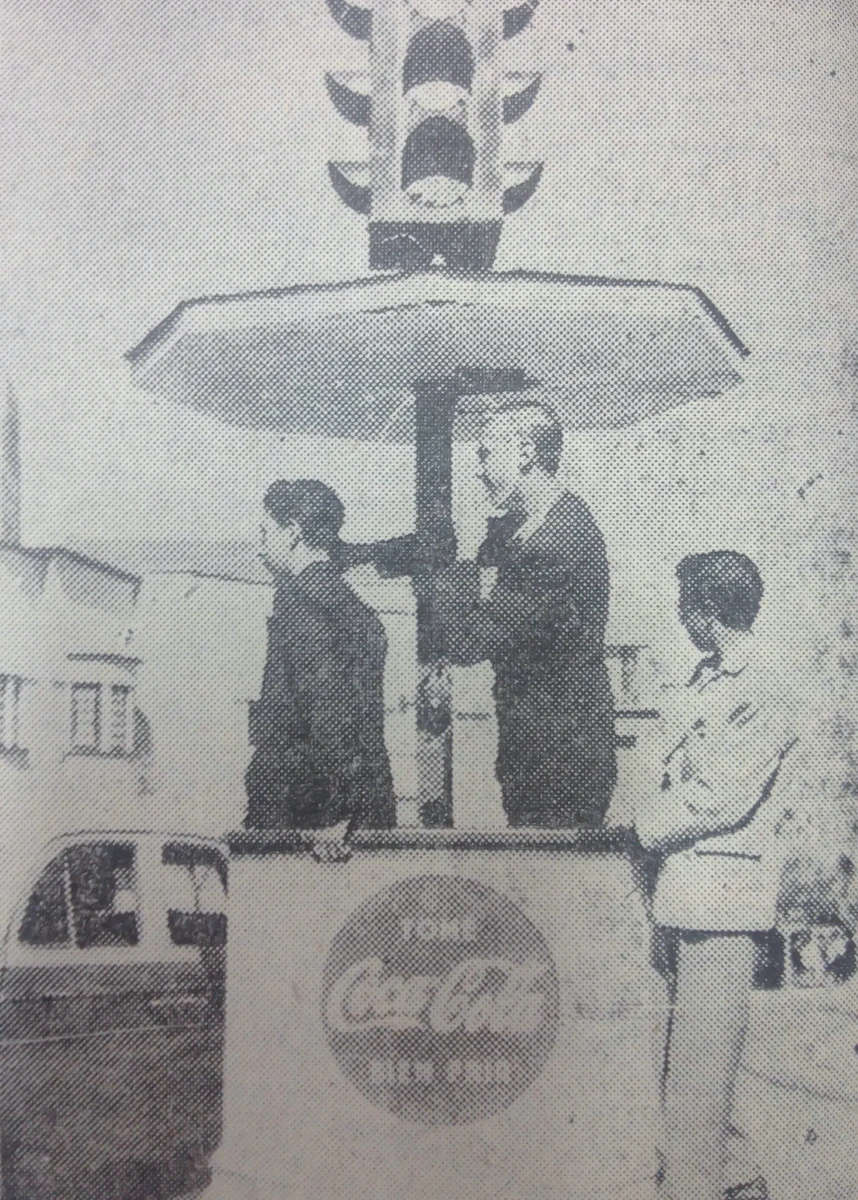
For some time after the riots, UMSA students took on the task of directing La Paz traffic.

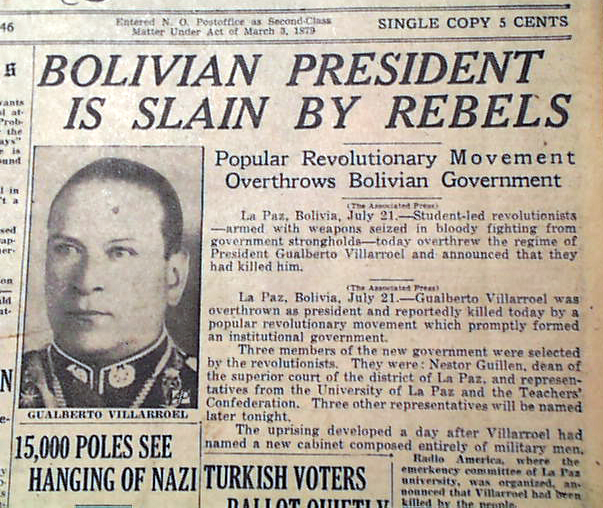
The newspaper Times-Picayune reports on the death of Villarroel, 22 July

Once the rioting died down, it was decided that provisional command of the government would be delegated to the Superior Court of Justice of the judicial district of La Paz whose magistrates were to head an interim junta presided over by Superior District Court President Tomás Monje. As Monje was ill and hence unable to assume leadership at the time, Superior District Court Dean Néstor Guillén was chosen to chair the junta in an interim capacity. The following day, a proper junta was formed with the participation of the magistrates Guillén and Cleto Cabrera García and the introduction of Montaño Daza and Raúl Calvimontes. The government junta was formally constituted on 24 July when representatives of the workers, students, and teachers were admitted into it. Representing the UMSA was Luis Gosalvez Indaburu, the Teachers' Confederation by Aniceto Solares, and organized labor by Aurelio Alcoba, secretary-general of the Trade Union Confederation of Bolivian Workers.

Immediately on 23 July, the junta published an eleven-point statement of intent. This included a commitment to respect domestic civil liberties as well as international agreements with other countries, and a pledge to call fresh, democratic presidential and legislative elections within three to four months. The junta also announced its intent to return all confiscated newspapers to their owners. La Razón had already been returned to its publisher on 21 July and El Diaro became the first newspaper to return to daily circulation on 22 July. Further, all government offices were officially reopened at 2 p.m. on 23 July.

In the case of the surviving former officials of the deposed regime, most escaped the country or took refuge in foreign embassies; Pinto sought asylum in the Mexican Embassy, Gutiérrez Granier in the Peruvian Embassy, and Ponce and Zuazo Cuenca in the Ecuadorian Legation. Other officials and cabinet members escaped in one C-47 transport plane and six small AT-6 two-seat trainer planes. Many MNR supporters, including Calero and Paz Estenssoro, went into the exile in Argentina where they were protected by the Peron regime. Villarroel's widow, Elena López, and their two children sought refuge in the La Paz Nunciature for some months before departing on 6 September to Argentina.

== See also ==
- Cabinet of Gualberto Villarroel
- Government Junta of Bolivia (1946–1947)
