= Workers Socialist Party of Bolivia =

Trotskyist political party in Bolivia (1940–1949)

The Workers Socialist Party of Bolivia (Spanish: Partido Socialista Obrero de Bolivia, PSOB) was a Trotskyist political party in Bolivia.

The Workers Socialist Party of Bolivia was established on 1 January 1940, by Tristán Marof (Gustavo Adolfo Navarro), a leader of the Confederation of Bolivian Workers (CSTB), after he was expelled from the Revolutionary Workers' Party in 1938.

The PSOB ran candidates on 10 March 1940 election for National Congress. One of the strongest Trotskyist opponents of the Tristán Marof, Guillermo Lora (leader of the POR), admitted that the PSOB "was in its time a party with a large membership and succeeded in achieving national proportions."

During the administration of President Enrique Peñaranda del Castillo (1940–1943) the Party supported this conservative regime. This charge was later denied by Marof. In 1943 after Gualberto Villarroel López’s revolution, the Workers Socialist Party of Bolivia was strongly persecuted and did not succeed in electing any members of Constituent Assembly in 1944. After the overthrow of the President Gualberto Villarroel in 1946, the PSOB resumed public activity. It ran candidates on 5 January 1947 election for National Congress, with Carlos Salazar and Alipio Valencia Vega.

In 1949 the Workers Socialist Party of Bolivia went out of existence. The principal reason for this was that Tristán Marof accepted the post of private secretary to President Enrique Hertzog Garaizabal, a representative of the traditional ruling oligarchy.
