= 1995 Bolivian state of siege =

- Date: April 18, 1995
- Location: Bolivia
- Caused by: Privatization; Tax reform; An end to compulsory union dues for teachers; Coca eradication programs
- Goals: Renegotiation of education and tax reforms; Compensation for coca growers; Local autonomy
- Methods: General strikes, protests, hunger strikes
- Result: A new agreement between the unions and central government

Parties
Bolivian central government	Bolivian Workers' Center (COB); Urban and Rural Teachers Confederation; Chapere coca growers

Lead figures
Gonzalo Sanchez de Lozada (president)	Óscar Salas Moya (COB); Evo Morales (Chapere coca growers spokesman)

The 1995 Bolivian state of siege was a civil conflict in Bolivia between workers and farmers from several industries and the central government. In early 1995, the Bolivian Workers' Center (COB), a confederation of teachers' unions representing around 887,000 workers, and rural coca growers began organizing strikes in protest of a number of policies and reforms adopted by the Revolutionary Nationalist Movement government led by Gonzalo Sanchez de Lozada. Among them were recent education reforms that teachers argued would lead to the privatization of the Bolivian education system, a tax reform that would reduce local autonomy, and the government's program of coca eradication at the behest of the United States.

Following months of intense national protests and a unilateral declaration of independence in the Tarija Department, on 18 April, the Bolivian government declared a state of siege that restricted movement within the country, imposed a curfew and prohibited all assemblies larger than three people. The government subsequently arrested hundreds of protestors, including Óscar Salas Moya and Evo Morales and deployed military troops to the streets of La Paz to maintain order. Protests would continue in spite of the siege as the unions worked towards an agreement with the government.

== Background ==
At the time of the conflict, Bolivia was South America's poorest country. With a population of 6.5 million, the nation's per capita gross domestic product was below $1,000. Bolivia administered around 87,000 public primary schools, employing around 87,000 teachers represented by the Urban and Rural Teachers Confederation (Confederacion de Maestros Urbanos y Rurales). Another 800,000 Bolivian workers, principally in the mining sector, health and municipal services and public school system were represented by the Bolivian Workers' Center (Central Obrera Boliviana, COB).

=== Tax reform ===
In December 1994, the Bolivian government passed legislation that would implement economic reforms, including reforms to the country's tax system. These changes included increases to existing levies, a restructuring of existing collection systems in view of making them more efficient and the elimination of many tax exemptions that were granted to individuals and businesses.

Among the most controversial changes was an increase in the commercial transaction tax from 1% to 3% and the removal of tariff exemptions for businesses that made use of foreign parts and supplies. These changes were broadly opposed, including by Bolivian businesses. The opposition among business owners decreased after the relevant changes were re-negotiated in order to reduce their scope.

One change that was not re-negotiated was a restructuring in national and municipal tax collection that would redirect taxes that were previously shared with municipalities, such as property and certain consumer taxes, so that they would go exclusively to the central government. This restructuring would shift funding towards the central government and subsequently reduce municipalities' autonomy over local projects. Bolivian economist Raul Penarand argued that the tax reform was a "direct effort" of the government to reduce local power in Bolivia, and that it would substantially reduce municipal tax income. He further argued that with less direct income, municipalities would be more reliant on the then wealthier central government. The Bolivian government was also planning to privatize a number of state-owned companies, including its petroleum company, electricity company, telecommunications company, public smelter, national airline and railroad system.

COB opposed the government's privatization plans and its redirection of taxes collected by the municipalities in conjunction with Bolivian civic committees (comites civicos) and other grassroots community organizations.

=== Education reform ===
Also in 1994, the Bolivian government passed new legislation that would reform the country's public education system. The reform bill would impose changes on school curricula and change graduation requirements with the aim of improving education quality. It would also require that schools provide courses in indigenous languages in hopes of improving literacy among Bolivia's indigenous communities. Students would be required to attend public school for 12 years in order to graduate, up from 9 years.

Additionally, the reform bill, financed by the World Bank, would abolish compulsory union dues. the Federaciones de Maestros Urbanos which organized Bolivian public school teachers earned $700,000 tax-free each year from the compulsory union dues. It would also reform school administration, teacher classification and pay scales and eliminate benefits previously won by the teachers union, including the "border bonds" (bono de frontera) many school employees earned on top of their monthly salaries.

The teachers union opposed the education reform on the basis that it would eliminate job security and lead to the privatization of the Bolivian public education system. A spokesperson for the teachers union said that the reform would "disrupt, if not completely destroy, careers in education." The union believed that the changes to school administration would lead to layoffs, and that the changes to the pay scale would make it harder for teachers to earn higher wages.

=== Coca eradication program ===
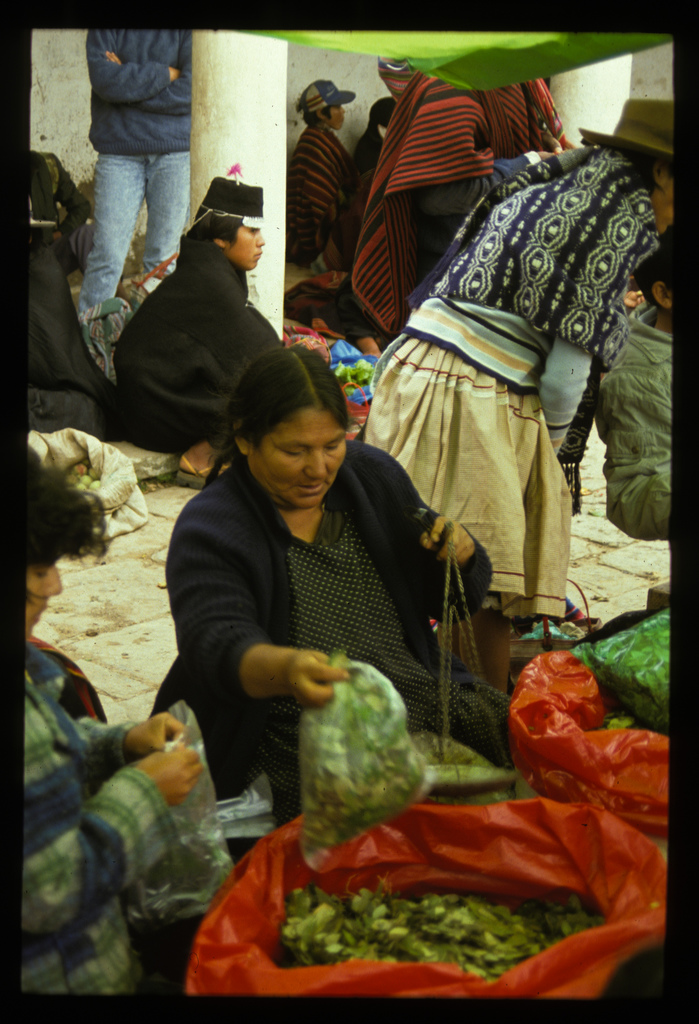
A widely grown crop in the country, The Bolivian military and US DEA sought to eradicate coca plantations due to concerns of its role in cocaine production

Coca is a plant commonly grown in the Chapare Province in Bolivia. While the plant has legitimate usages, its role in the production of cocaine complicates its cultivation in the Bolivian economy.

As a source of foreign aid, the United States held leverage over the central government of Bolivia. At the time, Bolivia was under intense pressure to crack down on its coca growers, including US-imposed "eradication quotas" carried out by the Bolivian military under the supervision of US Drug Enforcement Administration agents. The US government threatened to cut off aid to Bolivia if it failed to destroy 1,750 hectares of coca fields by the end of June 1995.

Bolivian coca growers protested the project. Opposition leaders in the country believed that the growers should be compensated for the destruction of their fields. Coca growers argued that the government should criminalize the refinement of coca into cocaine, rather than the cultivation of the crop itself. Earlier attempts to substitute coca with other crops in the region had proven unsuccessful and resulted in the loss of income to the farmers.

== Timeline ==
Over the course of the 1995 protests, thousands of workers marched almost daily in widespread street demonstrations. Despite having distinct goals, the teachers, coca growers and COB coordinated efforts throughout the conflict. Other sectors participated in the strikes as well. As a result of the teachers strikes, classes at half of all government run primary schools were suspended.

=== Early actions (January—February) ===
Throughout January 1995, the COB organized protests against the tax reforms alongside Bolivian civic committees and other grassroots organizations. Labour leaders demanded wages for workers be increased in compensation for the inflation they expected to follow the reforms' implementation. The COB wanted to see the Bolivian minimum wage increased by 200%. At the time, the minimum wage was BOB$190 per month (US$40), and the intended increase would bring it to $576 per month (US$121).

The intensity of the demonstrations increased in February as negotiations between the COB and the Bolivian central government broke down. The government was willing to increase the national minimum wage by 7.5% (to $204.50 per month, or US$43) but refused to go higher. The Bolivian government expressed concern that increasing the minimum wage by more than 7.5% would worsen inflation in the country, and that since their inflation target was 6.5%, new wages would beat inflation. A COB spokesperson argued that the 7.5% increase offered by the government would not meaningfully help to cover the increased cost of living, and that the union would "endlessly" protest until the government renegotiated the tax reform and raised the minimum wage. The COB organized large demonstrations in all major Bolivian cities. Their first action included two 48-hour strikes, with more planned in March. Some of the February demonstrations involved violent clashes with the police.

At the end of February, the COB organized a 24-hour general strike that paralyzed most economic activity in the country. The strike had its largest impact on the mining sector and health and municipal services, where COB membership is highest. COB also declared its plan to organize a peasant march to La Paz and a prolonged national strike. The Confederacion de Maestros Urbanos y Rurales de Bolivia, the national teachers' confederation in Bolivia, also started to organize strikes and demonstrations in protest of the government's education reforms, hoping to force them to renegotiate the changes.

=== National strikes (March—April) ===
The teachers, COB members and coca growers continued to organize actions throughout March and April. The weeks leading up to 19 April were among the most violent in Bolivia's recent history. In La Paz, police clashed with protestors almost every day, using rubber bullets, tear gas and arrests in an attempt to quell the unrest. The Bolivian central government refused to make any concessions. COB executive secretary Óscar Salas Moya commented that "in addition to the repression, the government has refused to meet our economic and social demands."

On 17 April, a popular assembly of 15,000 people in the Tarija Department gathered and resolved to form an independent government following the failure of the central government to meet their local demands. This "transitory departmental council" was endorsed by the bishop of Tarija. The central government declared the resolution unconstitutional and mobilized its army to Tarija to arrest the secessionist movement's leaders on 17 April. The central government's hard-line stance, which the unions saw as a provocation, was motivated by fear that popular local authorities elsewhere (such as those in Cochabamba and Santa Cruz) might follow suit in seeking greater local autonomy.

=== State of siege (April—June) ===
In the evening of 18 April, police raided the COB's headquarters, where labour leaders were meeting to reject a proposed agreement. Dozens of labour leaders were arrested and several reporters were beaten by police during the raid. The arrested union leaders were brought to a Bolivian air force base on the outer edge of La Paz, and local news reported that they were scheduled to be relocated to a detention center in the tropical region of Bolivia.

Shortly thereafter, in the morning of 19 April, Bolivian president Gonzalo Sánchez de Lozada imposed a state of siege in an attempt to quell the unrest. The siege would ban all strikes, protests and unauthorized meetings of three or more people for 90 days. The siege further imposed a curfew from midnight to 6 AM, a prohibition on carrying firearms, a suspension of constitutional rights and limitation on travel within the country, leaving 300 union leaders confined within designated towns. An additional 380 labour leaders and union members were arrested the day the siege was declared. The government deployed soldiers to patrol the streets of La Paz and rural areas in the country, which were a site of mass mobilization for the teachers and farmers. This action was denounced by opposition leaders and human rights organizations in the country who would join the unions continuing to protest in spite of it.

Both the coca growers and the urban unions decided to defy the siege. In a statement, Sanchez de Lozada said that the government would not make any concessions, that it would go through with the education reform law, and that it would uphold its commitment to eliminate what he referred to as surplus coca fields. The Bolivian unions felt provoked by the government's hard-line approach and called a national walkout in protest of the arrests. In light of Sanchez de Lozada's statement, the COB terminated an agreement on wage increases it had previously negotiated that was by then nearing implementation. Tens of thousands of miners, teachers, rail workers, healthcare workers, construction workers and factory workers joined the protest in solidarity.

Both Moya and Evo Morales, then chief spokesman of the Chapare coca growers, were arrested using emergency legislation during the siege, which provoked additional protests. The largest of these protests occurred on 23 April where Chapare farmers fought police officers and soldiers and another hundred coca growers were arrested. These arrests would unite the urban and rural unions against the central government.

On 29 April, after 6 weeks of strikes, the teachers' union came to an agreement with the government that would have them return to work on 3 May. In response, the government would free the unions' leaders confined under the state of siege, and union dues would once again be deducted directly from teachers' wages. The leaders of the teachers' union further agreed that talks would continue once their colleagues were freed, and they continued their calls for the state of siege to end.

On 2 May, the COB also came to an agreement with the government affecting the 34 COB-affiliated teachers unions that would bring the strike to an end. As a part of the agreement, the government would release all 300 confined union leaders and the state of siege would be lifted if talks continued and teachers returned to class. The government also promised to review the education reform legislation, however, they did not promise to repeal it.

Some of the teachers' unions opposed to COB agreement. Among them were the Trotskyite unions who called the COB negotiators "traitors and bureaucrats" for accepting an agreement that didn't free union members jailed on criminal charges. Javier Valdivieso, a leader of one of the teachers unions presented additional demands, including back pay for days where teachers were on strike and the firing of all authorities who threatened retaliation against strikers.

==== Subsequent actions ====
Following the conclusion of the first teachers' strike, two teachers from La Paz went on hunger strike held in the office of the Bolivian Human Rights Assembly in protest of the continued imprisonment of four labour leaders for sedition. On 9 May, the government raided the building.

On 6 June, thousands of participants protested peacefully in Santa Cruz de la Sierra, demanding government decentralization. The protest included a 24-hour work stoppage that paralyzed economic activity in the city. While the government warned that protesters would be arrested and established a strong military presence throughout the action, no arrests were made. 9 Bolivian departments shared the demand for decentralization, seeking more administrative autonomy and the right to elect their own state officials. The government proposed a new "Decentralization Law" in an attempt to resolve the concerns of the department, however, on 8 June, the departmental civic committees met in Cochabamba and rejected the law on the grounds that it didn't go far enough. Sanchez de Lozada said the departments' demands "threaten the unity of the country."

Following the May agreement, the state of siege stayed in effect, and by the beginning of June, none of the disputes that had initially motivated the protests had been resolved. On 13 June, the teachers struck again in defiance of the siege.

A union representing Bolivian teachers filed a complaint with the Secretary of Education regarding back pay and bonuses they were promised that were never paid out. Valdivieso said that the government had agreed to pay each teacher about US$107 in bonuses in addition to their salaries for May. Wages were a primary concern during the 13 June strike. Fred Nunez, a leader of a rural teachers' union, added that 300 teachers were fired without just cause during the strike and replaced by people with no training or experience, selected by the governing Revolutionary Nationalist Movement party.

== Reactions ==
The Roman Catholic Church opposed the measures employed by the Bolivian central government, calling them repressive. La Paz bishop Luis Sainz was quoted saying "The state of siege is not good for the people who see their rights restricted or for the country because of the negative image it creates"

== See also ==
- Coca in Bolivia
- 1946 La Paz riots
- Cochabamba Water War
- 2003 La Paz riots
