= Mining Parliamentary Bloc =

The Mining Parliamentary Bloc (Spanish: Bloque Minero Parlamentario, BMP) was an electoral political alliance of the Revolutionary Nationalist Movement (MNR) and Revolutionary Workers' Party (POR) in Bolivia.

The Mining Parliamentary Bloc was established in 1946, for the 1947 presidential and congressional elections.

The Mining Parliamentary Bloc presented as its presidential candidate Víctor Paz Estenssoro, the leader of the MNR. The Bloc elected two senators (Juan Lechín Oquendo (MNR) and Lucio Mendivil (POR)) and seven deputies (Jesús Aspiazu (MNR), Alberto Costa de la Torre (MNR), Adan Rojas (MNR), Humberto Salamanca (POR), Mario Torres Calleja (MNR), Guillermo Lora (POR), and Aníbal Vargas (POR)).
