= Trade Union Confederation of Bolivian Workers =

Trade union confederation in Bolivia from 1936 to 1952

The Trade Union Confederation of Bolivian Workers (Spanish: Confederación Sindical de Trabajadores de Bolivia, CSTB) was the largest and most prominent trade union confederation in Bolivia from 1936 to 1952.

A National Labor Congress met on 29 November–6 December 1936, with 134 delegates present, and created the CSTB. The congress adopted a number of resolutions, these included demands for nationalization of the holdings of "Standard Oil Company" in Bolivia and workers' profit sharing, minimum wage related to the cost of living.

The CSTB at its inception was based principally on the chauffeurs and factory workers of La Paz, some factory workers' unions in Oruro, and a few groups of miners, as well as various artisans' groups. Most CSTB leaders worked closely with the Germán Busch Becerra’ government.

For the 1938 congressional elections, the CSTB was the component of the pro-military Socialist Single Front and elected many deputies of the Assembly. During the 1938 Constituent Assembly, the CSTB was an influential element of the leftist political grouping. Germán Busch Becerra also appointed CSTB representatives to various government commissions.

The Confederation held its Second Congress in La Paz in January 1939. There was considerable political controversy, particularly between the followers of Tristan Marof and those favoring the Stalinist-oriented Front of the Bolivian Left, led by Jose Antonio Arze. Fearing the efforts of Arze's backers to make the CSTB part of his Front the Marofist elements, who were in the majority, pushed through a resolution declaring the "complete autonomy" of the CSTB from all political parties.

Political controversy continued within the CSTB, when the forces led by José Antonio Arze held a congress in July 1940 to convert the Front of the Bolivian Left into a political party, the Revolutionary Left Party (PIR), an invitation was sent to the CSTB to participate in this meeting. The Executive of the CSTB, still controlled by Tristan Marof, refused this invitation. As a consequence of this quarrel, the CSTB split. The pro-PIR elements called a "Congress" of the CSTB in 1942, which chose Aurelio Alcoba of the PIR as its secretary-general. But the majority of the CSTB remained loyal to the old leadership. However, the influence of Marof was declining. When the CSTB was finally reunited, it was firmly under the control of the PIR.

The CSTB dispersed in 1952; the newly formed Bolivian Workers' Center (COB) became the country's primary union federation.
