= Tristán Marof =

Bolivian diplomat, writer, essayist, and journalist

- Born: Gustavo Adolfo Navarro; 1898; Sucre, Bolivia
- Died: 1979 (aged 80–81); Santa Cruz de la Sierra, Bolivia
- Occupations: Diplomat, writer, essayist, journalist

Tristán Marof (née Gustavo Adolfo Navarro; 1898, Sucre, Bolivia – 1979, Santa Cruz de la Sierra, Bolivia) was a Bolivian diplomat, writer, essayist, and journalist. He was Consul of Bolivia in Europe, where he was linked to the labor movement and Marxist-Leninist organizations.

The Socialist Workers' Party of Bolivia was established on 1 January 1940, by Marof, then leader of the Confederation of Bolivian Workers (CSTB), after he was expelled from the Revolutionary Workers' Party in 1938.

== Early years ==
Gustavo Adolfo Navarro was born in Chuquisaca (present-day Sucre, Bolivia) in 1898, to Valentín Navarro and Delfina Ameller, both of Spanish descent. A baptismal record for an “Adolfo G. Navarro” preserved on FamilySearch gives September 28, 1896, as the date of birth of a son of Valentín Navarro and Delfina Ameller. It has been suggested that this child may have died shortly after birth and that the same name was subsequently given to another son born in 1898. The relationship between the two records, however, has not been conclusively established.

His father and an uncle reportedly participated in the War of the Pacific, in which Bolivia and Peru fought against Chile. According to Navarro's later accounts, his mother was a “neighborhood poet” (poetisa de barrio).

Valentín Navarro and Delfina Ameller had eight children. According to Navarro, his father “made his fortune”, enabling his children to pursue higher education. Gustavo Adolfo enrolled at the Faculty of Law of the Universidad Mayor, Real y Pontificia de San Francisco Xavier de Chuquisaca in Sucre. In 1915, he was arrested for the first time while protesting against the state of siege declared by General Ismael Montes. Several months later, he was arrested again, reportedly in connection with articles he had published criticizing the government.

== Republicanism ==
From 1920 it became part of the heterogeneous Republican Party, following the line of Bautista Saavedra. That year a military coup deposed the liberal president José Gutiérrez Guerra and installed a junta under the leadership of Saavedra, who was later elected president. Marof's active participation during the revolt, including administration of the prison La Paz during the coup, earned him a nomination for the post of consul in Le Havre, France.

== Marof in Europe ==
During the years he spent in France, Navarro gradually leaned towards communism and Marxism. Contacted thinkers, politicians and writers of these trends, as Henri Barbusse, who wrote prefaces to his works and inserted it into French leftist circles. During this time he also began to form in works such as The Americas naive o justice of the Inca, the Inca system idealized conception, to which he attributes the like communism. It is in France that takes the pseudonym Tristan Marof, publishing The naive American continent. His position was quickly consul committed his radical communist thought, so resigned, but remained in Europe until 1926.

== Exile ==
Back in Bolivia, Marof quickly began contacting local politicians to organize a Marxist socialist movement. In 1927, he organized, with Roberto Hinojosa, what they called the Maximum Socialist Party. He ran for Congress for Sucre with this acronym, but the government denounced a Communist coup planned by Marof and his organization, and he had to go into exile in Argentina.

His life in exile was mainly traveling, through Panama, Mexico, Peru and Cuba among other countries, for nearly 10 years. During this time he published some of his most influential works, including Wall Street and Hunger (Wall Street y hambre) and Mexico to the Front and Side (México de frente y de perfil), which also created controversy over criticism of the Mexican Revolution. The same Mexican government expelled him, accusing him of subversion.

The many contacts and links that Marof developed in exile, including the likes of José Carlos Mariátegui or Víctor Raúl Haya de la Torre, and his constant activism gave him some notoriety in groups and progressive circles of the Latin American left. This was also some controversy with the Communist International, and the diplomacy of the Soviet Union. The exile of Leon Trotsky and the apparent support by Marof for it, were some of the causes of these differences.

While in Argentina, Marof founded the group "Túpac Amaru", a Marxist and pacifist power, contrary to belligerence in the nascent Chaco conflict. This group merged with other fronts of the Bolivian left, including the Bolivian left in Chile and "Exiles in Peru", to form the Revolutionary Workers' Party (POR) in 1935. Among the early leaders of this party were Marof, José Aguirre Gainsbourg, Alipio Valencia and Eduardo Arze.

== Work ==
His work has been characterized by critics permanent Bolivian society and political structures. His first novel, The Civic, has a strong political support Bautista Saavedra . For the depth of its analysis and interpretation of the reality of Bolivia is compared by many with the Peruvian author José Carlos Mariátegui. The best known works are Marof Tristan: "Justice del Inca", published in Belgium, "Essays and Criticism: Revolutions Bolivian international wars and Writers", "Wall Street and Hunger", published in 1927, "The Tragedy of the Altiplano "" Truth in Bolivia socialist "," The danger Nazi in Bolivia "," The Oath "," Mexico from the front and side, "among others. While in Cordoba, Argentina, wrote: "Banished from my country since 1927, three successive governments refused me entry into Bolivia. I was sentenced to six years in prison for attempted military rebellion. processed without hearing me, I refused nationality, slandered me and tried to ruin me, prosecute me again, this time condemning me to death, asked the Argentine government to persecute me in their territory and deny me their hospitality. " He was critical of the Chaco War that pitted Bolivia and Paraguay, who sacrificed in an absurd war thousands of indigenous Guarani who lived hundreds of years as sister nations. In direct language Tristan Marof held that "a powerful company, holds more than four million and a half of oil lands, pushed for that purpose (the war). Inept and treacherous in their own country, the miserable bourgeoisie threw himself into the arms of financial capital. Following the war the business was already solved: for heroes medals, ribbons, speeches and hunger for lawyers, businessmen, politicians and Bolivians arrastrasen at the foot of the imperialists in the invidious office of pimps in their own country, perks and jobs. Thus the rear and the generals have been rewarded. " Until 1967 published Marof Tristan valuable comments on the authors and the history of Bolivia and on international politics. He wrote his autobiography under the title: "The novel of a man." His reflections, as he wrote in his introduction to "Essays and Criticism" are still generating debate: "This is the national default and national evil; lack of maturity and balance, emotional depth and emotional as unfair and pessimistic. Bolivians any latitude, whether the Andes and the valley and the tropics, believe their misfortunes are the result of fortune and luck, not giving any value to the idea and the brain. therefore are elements of disorder and no social scales or distinctions: all are emotional and therefore unjust. Here in these highlands, arose in a culture very old times in the eastern plains and a promise. Though loathe both, are completed. Someone eventually destroyed, both be destroyed to make way for the unit, they are prosperous and rich. Bolivia That is the future. "

== Other works ==
- The civics, 1919
- Suetonio Pimienta, novel, 1924
- The Experiment, 1947
- The Illustrious City, novel, 1950
- Essays and Criticism. Bolivian Revolutions, International Wars and Writers, 1961.

== Notes ==
↑ Baciu, 1987, p. 227 ↑ Alexander, 1991, p. 117 ↑ Schelchkov, 2009, p. 3 ↑ Mesa Gisbert, 2004, p. 137 ↑ Schelchkov, 2009, p. 4 ↑ Schelchkov, 2009, p. 5 ↑ Schelchkov, 2009, p. 5 ↑ Schelchkov, 2009, p. 5 ↑ Sándor John, 2009, p. 38 ↑ Schelchkov, 2009, p. 4 ↑ Schelchkov, 2009, p. 10 ↑ Sándor John, 2009, p. 49 ↑ Schelchkov, 2009, p. 4 ↑ Marof, 1961, p. 8
