= Antifascist Democratic Front =

The Antifascist Democratic Front (Spanish: Frente Democrático Antifascista, FDA) was a political alliance of the traditionalist and left-wing parties in Bolivia.

The Antifascist Democratic Front was created on 18 December 1945 by:

- the Liberal Party, PL;
- the Republican Socialist Party, PRS;
- the Genuine Republican Party, PRG;
- the United Socialist Party, PSU and
- the Revolutionary Left Party, PIR.

These were desperate attempts to stem the radical tide of the government of Gualberto Villarroel López. On 21 July 1946, students and workers overthrew the government and Gualberto Villarroel was killed.

After the overthrow of the President Gualberto Villarroel, on 10 November 1946, the Genuine Republican Party, Republican Socialist Party and the United Socialist Party merged and formed the new Republican Socialist Unity Party. The PURS left the Antifascist Democratic Front.

For the 1947 general elections, the Antifascist Democratic Front was reestablished by:

- the Liberal Party, PL;
- the Revolutionary Left Party, PIR and
- the Social Democratic Party, PSD.

In 1947, the FDA's candidate Luis Femando Guachalla narrowly lost to Enrique Hertzog of the PURS.
