= Opinión =

Local newspaper in Cochabamba, Bolivia

Opinión is a newspaper published in Cochabamba, Bolivia. Founded in January 1985, as the information arm of the COBOCE cooperative; said entity was still its parent company in 2025. Its founder and former director is Edwin Tapia Frontanilla.

== History ==
In 2015, its director was Federico Sabat, and in 2025, the director is Brenda Molina.

In 2019, Opinión suffered threats when it published a news item about a bomb explosion in a shopping mall; if the news item was not suppressed, it would be subject to another even bigger bomb.

In 2020 Opinión declared to the Plurinational Electoral Organ to be of national circulation. In 2024, the newspaper was a member of the Bolivian National Press Association; the treasurer of the Association was a representative of the newspaper.

In 2025 a labor dispute had taken Opinión to court, shortly after the newspaper celebrated its 40th anniversary.
