= Guillermo Lora =

Bolivian Trotskyist labor leader and writer (1922–2009)

Guillermo Lora (Uncia, Potosi, 31 October 1922 – La Paz, 17 May 2009) was a Trotskyist leader in Bolivia who was active in the Revolutionary Workers' Party (POR) from the early 1940s and was its best known leader.

Lora became active in the POR when it was in the process of building links with the Bolivian labor movement, most notably the Federation of Bolivian Mine Workers (FSTMB). Following the POR's participation in the 1952 "Bolivian National Revolution", its power was quickly circumscribed by the ruling Revolutionary Nationalist Movement (MNR). In the 1960s, when a faction of the POR sought to follow the example of Che Guevara and engage in guerrilla warfare, Lora led a second group, generally referred to as 'POR(Masas)', that maintained its focus on the labor movement. Though Lora sympathized with the International Committee of the Fourth International, his faction of the POR did not affiliate with any international socialist grouping during the time. In 1988, POR(Masas) founded the Liaison Committee for the Reconstruction of the Fourth International (CERCI).

During the years of military dictatorship in Bolivia in the 1970s, Lora and his faction of the POR were an important ally of Juan Lechín Oquendo (the president of the miners' union). Though it is far smaller than at its height in 1952, Lora's POR still remains as one of the largest Trotskyist groups in Bolivia.
