= Workers' Party of Tarija =

The Workers' Party of Tarija (Spanish: Partido Obrero de Tarija, PODT) was a small local socialist political party in the Tarija Department, Bolivia.

The Workers' Party of Tarija was founded in 1942 by Alberto Sánchez Rossel. It ran candidates in March 1942 election for National Congress and elected the one deputy (Alberto Sánchez Rossel).

In 1943 after Gualberto Villarroel López’s revolution, the Workers' Party of Tarija went out of existence.
