= Revolutionary Workers' Party (Bolivia) =

Political Party in Bolivia

Revolutionary Workers' Party Partido Obrero Revolucionario
- Abbreviation: POR
- Founder: Gustavo Navarro, José Aguirre Gainsborg
- Founded: December 1935
- Newspaper: Masas
- Ideology: Trotskyism; Communism; Marxism; Marxism–Leninism
- International affiliation: Fourth International

The Revolutionary Workers' Party (Spanish: Partido Obrero Revolucionario, POR) is a Trotskyist political party in Bolivia. At its height in the late 1940s and early 1950s, the POR was able to gain a mass working-class following.

== History ==
=== Beginnings ===
The POR was founded in December 1935 at a congress in Córdoba, Argentina, called by Gustavo Navarro and other Bolivian radicals who were in exile because of the Chaco War. The congress formally merged three Bolivian exile groups based in Argentina, Chile, and Peru respectively. Under the advice of José Aguirre Gainsborg, the leaders of the new POR affiliated with Leon Trotsky's International Left Opposition. When the Chaco War ended in 1935, the POR leaders returned to Bolivia. The leaders disagreed over whether to maintain a strict Trotskyist party or form a broad socialist movement.

As Bolivia passed through a series of short-lived military dictatorships, the POR began to enter the emerging labor movement. In 1947 the party's activists formed the Mining Parliamentary Bloc caucus in the newly formed miners' union (the FSTMB), which was to become the most active and militant union in Bolivia. Along with the populist Revolutionary Nationalist Movement (MNR) it became one of the two most influential parties in the mineworkers' movement. FSTMB president Juan Lechín, an MNR member, maintained good relations with the POR. In November 1946, the FSTMB adopted a program known as the "Pulacayo Thesis" that was heavily influenced by the POR's ideology. The Pulacayo thesis was essentially an application of Trotsky's Transitional Program to Bolivian conditions.

=== Bolivian National Revolution ===
After a military coup nullified the results of the 1951 elections (which gave the MNR a plurality), the MNR, POR and FSTMB led workers' militias that stormed army barracks and forced the military junta to surrender on April 12, 1952. Following the "Bolivian National Revolution," the MNR took over the government, but the populist party failed to enact major social reforms because of pressure from international agencies.

Pablo, the leader of the IS, characterised the MNR as petty-bourgeois. Others have criticised this arguing that the POR was bourgeois.

The POR played a supportive role in the creation of the Central Obrera Boliviana (COB), a new federation of labor unions, in 1952. However, when members of the POR began to criticize the moderation of the MNR-led government in October 1952, the MNR removed key POR leaders from the COB and FSTMB. As the MNR's power grew at the cost of the POR, in-fighting increased among the Trotskyists.

In 1954, the POR split into two factions. One of these factions (led by Guillermo Lora) was opposed to continued work with the MNR. The other faction (led by Hugo González Moscoso) was less critical of the MNR and sought to work with the left wing of the MNR.

In 1956, Lora founded a separate party (also named POR) that drew supporters of his newspaper, Masas.

=== 1960s to the present ===
In 1963, a large number of POR members left the party to join Juan Lechín's new Revolutionary Party of the Nationalist Left (PRIN).

The faction of the POR led by Guillermo Lora continued its activity in the COB and FSTMB during the 1960s and 1970s, when the country was ruled by a series of short-lived military juntas. Lora's POR worked closely with FSTMB president Juan Lechín during these years, when the labor movement largely operated clandestinely. Between 1970 and 1971, when General Juan José Torres allowed a Popular Assembly (Asamblea Popular) to operate, which included unions and was led by Lechín. The POR led forces that sought to keep the assembly independent of Torres. After Torres' overthrow, Lora and other POR leaders went into exile.

In 1988 Lora's POR founded the Liaison Committee for the Reconstruction of the Fourth International together with other Latin American trotskyists.

The wing of the POR led by González Moscoso, which remained the official affiliate of the Trotskyist Fourth International, turned to the idea of armed insurrection against the government. Inspired by Che Guevara's guerrilla tactics, they sought to engage in rural combat against the government. The González wing of the POR faced harsh government repression and eventually disappeared.

Lora's POR continues to exist to the present day, though it has been eclipsed by other radical parties such as Evo Morales' Movement toward Socialism (MAS). It continues to publish Masas.

== See also ==
- Guillermo Lora
