= Revolutionary Left Party =

Revolutionary Left Party Partido de la Izquierda Revolucionaria
- Leader: José Antonio Arze
- Founded: 26 July 1940
- Dissolved: c. 1964
- Preceded by: Bolivian Left Front
- Ideology: Communism; Marxism
- Political position: Left-wing to far-left
- National affiliation: Antifascist Democratic Front (1947)

The Revolutionary Left Party (Spanish: Partido de la Izquierda Revolucionaria, PIR) was a communist party in Bolivia. It was founded by Dr. José Antonio Arze and other Bolivian intellectuals on 26 July 1940 during a left-wing congress held in Oruro.

The PIR was sympathetic to the Communist International, but did not become an affiliate to the International. The PIR began to organize the country's miners, but it did so cautiously for fear that strikes would hinder supplies for the Allies during World War II. Except for the pro-Axis Gualberto Villarroel, the PIR generally supported all of Bolivia's war-time presidents to assure the nation remained an Allied power. Because of the party's hesitation to engage in domestic issues, it lost much of its working-class support to the Revolutionary Nationalist Movement (MNR) and the Revolutionary Workers' Party (POR).

In 1950, a section of the PIR membership broke away and founded the Communist Party of Bolivia (PCB). By the 1960s, the PCB had to a large extent replaced the PIR. Following the military coup in 1964, the PIR went underground and disintegrated into warring factions. A reconstituted PIR emerged in the late 1970s as a puppet party of the dictator Hugo Banzer. In 1979, it dissolved into Banzer's new Nationalist Democratic Action (ADN).

== Sources ==
- Jerry W. Knudson, The Impact of the Catavi Mine Massacre of 1942 on Bolivian Politics and Public Opinion. In: The Americas, Vol. 26, No. 3 (January 1970), 254-276.
- Herbert S. Klein, A Concise History of Bolivia (Cambridge University Press, 2003). ISBN 0-521-80782-4
