= Anarchism in Bolivia =

Anarchism in Bolivia has a relatively short but rich history, spanning over a hundred years, primarily linked to syndicalism, the peasantry, and various social movements. Its heyday was during the 20th century's first decades, between 1910 and 1930, but a number of contemporary movements still exist.

== History ==
The first recorded anarchist movement in Bolivia was the Unión Obrera Primero de Mayo in 1906, in the small southern town of Tupiza. The organization edited the newspaper La Aurora Social. Other contemporary libertarian publications were Verbo Rojo, El Proletario and La Federación, published in the cities of Potosí, Cochabamba and Santa Cruz de la Sierra, respectively. Several minor trade unions came together to form the Local Workers' Federation (FOL) in 1908, and in 1912 the Federación Obrera Internacional (FOI). They adopted the red and black flag of anarcho-syndicalism. In the city of La Paz, FOL maintained the periodical Luz y Verdad, while FOI published the Defensa Obrera, which launched a campaign for an eight-hour day. 1918 the FOI was renamed the Federación Obrera del Trabajo (FOT), which moved ideologically towards marxism.

During the 1920s, the presence of anarchism within the labor movement was at its highest point, with anarchist participating in the struggles of the Bolivian miners. Many strikes - such as in Huanuni in 1919 - were started to demand an eight-hour work day. The anarcho-syndicalist FOL, later associated with the international Asociación Continental Americana de Trabajadores confederation, published the weekly newspaper La Humanidad. Numerous anarchist movements were active in La Paz, such as the Centro Cultural Obrero, the Centro Obrero Libertario, the Grupo Libertario "Rendición", Sembrando Ideas, Brazo y Cerebro, and the group La Antorcha (founded in 1923) led by Luis Cusicanqui, Jacinto Centellas and Domitila Pareja. Other groups elsewhere in the country were the Centro Obrero Internacional in Oruro, the Escuela Ferrer i Guardia in Sucre, and the newspaper Tierra y Libertad.

Women had a prominent role in the anarcho-syndicalist movement. In 1927 the Sindicato Femenino de Oficios Varios was founded. Also founded in 1927 was the Federación Obrera Femenina, a branch of FOL and merger of several other all-female unions. Among female anarchist activists were Catalina Mendoza, Petronila Infantes, and Susana Rada. During the Third National Workers' Congress in 1926, the Bolivian communists proposed that the labor organizations should affiliate with the Third International, an idea which was rejected by the anarcho-syndicalists. The FOL was also present in the agrarian peasantry, organizing the Federación Agraria Departamental (FAD), which later disappeared due to intense government repression.

Bolivian anarcho-syndicalism had a strong presence of foreign activists, many of which had fled their countries due to political persecution. Among them were one Fournarakis, an activist of the Argentine Regional Workers' Federation (FORA) sent into exile, Armando Treviño who was a Chilean cobbler belonging to the Industrial Workers of the World, the Peruvian Francisco Gamarra and Paulino Aguilar, and the Spanish Nicolás Mantilla and Antonio García Barón, the later who came to the country in the 1950s.

In 1930, encouraged by the Argentine FORA, the Confederación Obrera Regional Boliviana was founded. The organization, which lasted only two years, published La Protesta. In the 1930s the group Ideario emerged in Tupiza. It published La Voz del Campo. At this point the anarchist movement was in decay, having faced growing government persecution. The Chaco War also caused many problems. Later, anarcho-syndicalist unions saw themselves forced to join the Bolivian Workers' Center to survive. Some anarchists tried to influence the BWC from within, among them Líber Forti. In 1946 the Núcleo de Capacitación Sindical Libertario was formed. Unlike its mother organization FOL, the Federación Obrera Femenina weathered the interwar period, surviving until 1964.

The Spanish expropriative anarchist, and notorious bank robber and forger, Lucio Urtubia participated in planning the kidnapping of Klaus Barbie, the "Butcher of Lyon", a former Nazi German officer and war criminal who after fleeing to Bolivia with the help of the CIA helped the government fight Communist guerrillas, later aiding a coup d'état in 1980. In the 1950s Antonio García Barón (1921–2008), described by the BBC as the last surviving member of the Durruti Column, an anarchist militia in the Spanish Civil War, and a former prisoner of the Mauthausen-Gusen concentration camp, moved to Bolivia with his wife Irma. There he started a self-described anarchist community, deep in the jungle of San Buenaventura.

=== Contemporary ===
In the modern period anarchism has seen a minor renaissance in Bolivia. Several groups exists, prominently among them Mujeres Creando, an anarcha-feminist collective. The organization participates in a range of anti-poverty work, including spreading propaganda, street theater and direct action. The group was founded by María Galindo, Mónica Mendoza and Julieta Paredes in 1992 and members include two of Bolivia's only openly lesbian activists. It publishes Mujer Pública, produces a weekly radio show, and maintains a cultural café named Virgen de los deseos. In 2001, Mujeres Creando gained international attention due to their alleged participation in an armed occupation of the Bolivian Banking Supervisory Agency.

Other groups and collectives include the Grupo de Apoyo a los Movimientos Sociale in Cochabamba, Combate La Paz and El Alto, Acción Anarquista Quepus im Sucre, Quilombo Libertario e Infrarrojo in Santa Cruz, and the Colectivo Libertario Gritos in Tarija. Since 2005 there exists an anarchist student movement in the southern region of the Gran Chaco, the Autonomía Frente Universitario. Anarchist newspapers and fanzines include Contraataque, Insumisión and Oveja Negra.

The Black Bridge International, a defunct "decentralized anarchist mutual aid network", had a local group in Bolivia. In 2003, an affiliated collective in New York City produced a Black Bridge documentary entitled "Bolivia Calling".

The Informal Anarchist Federation (FAI), an insurrectionary anarchist organization, with cells throughout Europe and Latin America, is active in Bolivia. On May 30, 2012, four youths were arrested in connection to a dynamite attack on a military barracks and the bombing of a car dealership. Both attacks were claimed by the FAI.

== See also ==
- Category:Bolivian anarchists
- List of anarchist movements by region
- Anarchism in Chile
- Anarchism in Peru
