= Anarchic Cell for Revolutionary Solidarity =

Anarchic Cell For Revolutionary Solidarity
- Célula Anárquica Por la Solidaridad Revolucionaria
- Dates active: April 2012–May 31, 2012
- Country: Bolivia
- Active regions: La Paz
- Ideology: Insurrectionary anarchism Individualist anarchism Expropriative anarchism Green anarchism
- Status: Defunct
- Part of: Informal Anarchist Federation

The Anarchic Cell For Revolutionary Solidarity (Spanish: Célula Anárquica Por la Solidaridad Revolucionaria, CASR-FAI/FRI) was an anarchist urban guerrilla group that was active in the city of La Paz, where it carried out several explosive attacks in the first half of 2012, causing material damage.

== Activity ==
In April 2012, it claimed attacks under various different names in the cities of La Paz and Cochabamba. The first attack by the group was reported on May 14, 2012 when they detonated an explosive charge with two sticks of dynamite at the French car importer Renault, located on October 20 avenue in the city of La Paz, damaging two vehicles and the company's windows. Hours later the group claimed responsibility in a statement where it stated its motives, questioning the democratic system, anthropocentrism and also announcing more attacks.

On May 24, 2012, militants of the group left explosives in a bank branch of the Banco Nacional de Bolivia that was attached to the Miraflores Grand Barracks in La Paz, completely destroying it, as well as doing material damage to the surroundings, but without leaving civilians injured. The group claimed responsibility in a statement, where it mentioned that the attack was in memory of Mauricio Morales (an Argentine militant who died three years earlier), in addition to claiming it "in honor" of the militants of the Local Workers' Federation, which had attacked that same barracks in September 1931.

=== Arrests ===
Due to the insurrectionary attacks, the anarchists Henry Zegarrundo and Renato Vincenti were arrested on May 29 along with three other people, accused of being responsible for a series of attacks carried out in that region, which were used to dismantle the libertarian movement and the Bolivian environmental movement.

Since Zegarrundo's arrest, raids and arrests were carried out that did not lead to a conviction due to lack of evidence against the accused. There was a strong controversy, due to acts of betrayal within the libertarian movement such as Zegarrundo's complaint against Vincenti, betrayal mainly due to currents linked with insurrectionary Chilean circles, which promoted a more radical discourse similar to those professed by the Italian anarchist Alfredo M. Bonanno. Some militants denounced that these arrests were carried out in order for the government of Evo Morales to show a good image in terms of security before the representatives of the OAS.

Another noteworthy element was the insurrectionary sector accusing the Anarchist Organization for the Social Revolution (OARS) of being "reformist and traitorous", even claiming they were part of the sabotage in favor of the arrested militants. Within OARS, an attitude of victimization and collaboration with the police was exhibited, that attitude of victimization and the lack of a conviction against Vincenti occurred despite the fact that a gun was found fired at his residence and despite the fact that Vincenti manifested a visceral hatred of intellectuals and higher education.

By May 31, the cell was dissolved, it was also confirmed that one of the detainees Nina Marcilla was the daughter of the Bolivian ambassador in Mexico, Jorge Mansilla Torred. Nina Mancilla claimed to be innocent and not involved in the attacks or with insurrectional militancy, for which the authorities carried out a "witch hunt against ideas contrary to the ruling class."

== See also ==
- Anarchism in Bolivia
- Néstor Paz Zamora Commission
- Túpac Katari Guerrilla Army
- Zarate Willka Armed Forces of Liberation
