= CASR =

CASR may refer to:

- Anarchic Cell for Revolutionary Solidarity (Spanish: Célula Anárquica Por la Solidaridad Revolucionaria), an anarchist urban guerilla group in Bolivia
- Calcium-sensing receptor encoded by the CASR gene
- State highways in California
