= Pollera =

Long, full skirt of Spanish origin, worn throughout Latin America as part of folk dress

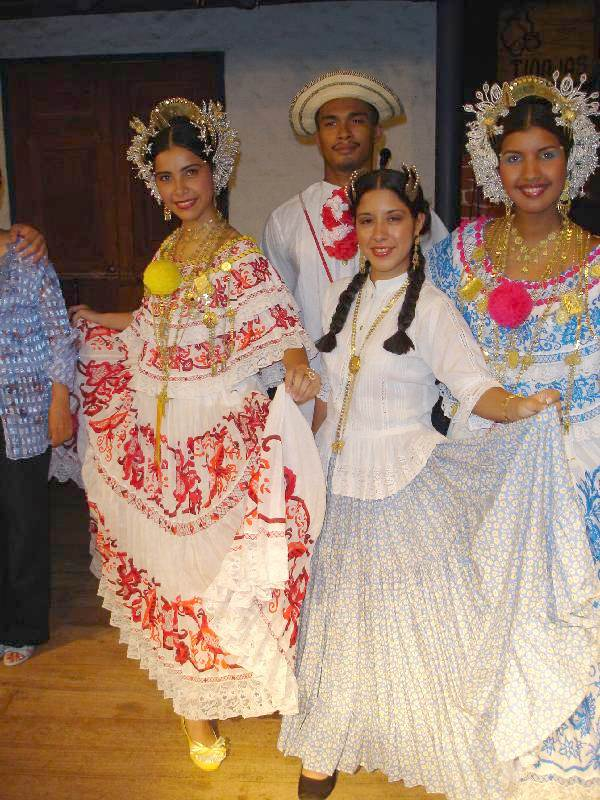
- a variety of Panamanian polleras
- Type: Folk costume
- Material: Cotton; Wool; Linen; Lace
- Place of origin: Latin America; Panama; Bolivia; Peru; Spain

The pollera is a traditional skirt and ensemble with origins in Panama, Bolivia, and Peru, each region developing its own distinctive styles and cultural significance over time.

The Panamanian pollera has evolved into the national folk costume, crafted by specialized artisans with elaborate embroidery and lacework. Panamanian polleras are handmade, vary by region and occasion, and can be highly expensive. They reflect a mix of Indigenous, European, and Afro-Antillean influences and identities, and can be worn by everyone.

The Bolivian and Peruvian polleras are pleated skirts, mostly associated with Indigenous and mestizo women, especially in urban and rural settings. In Bolivia, the pollera became a visible marker of class and ethnic identity, and is central to both social activism and cultural resistance.

== Panamanian pollera ==
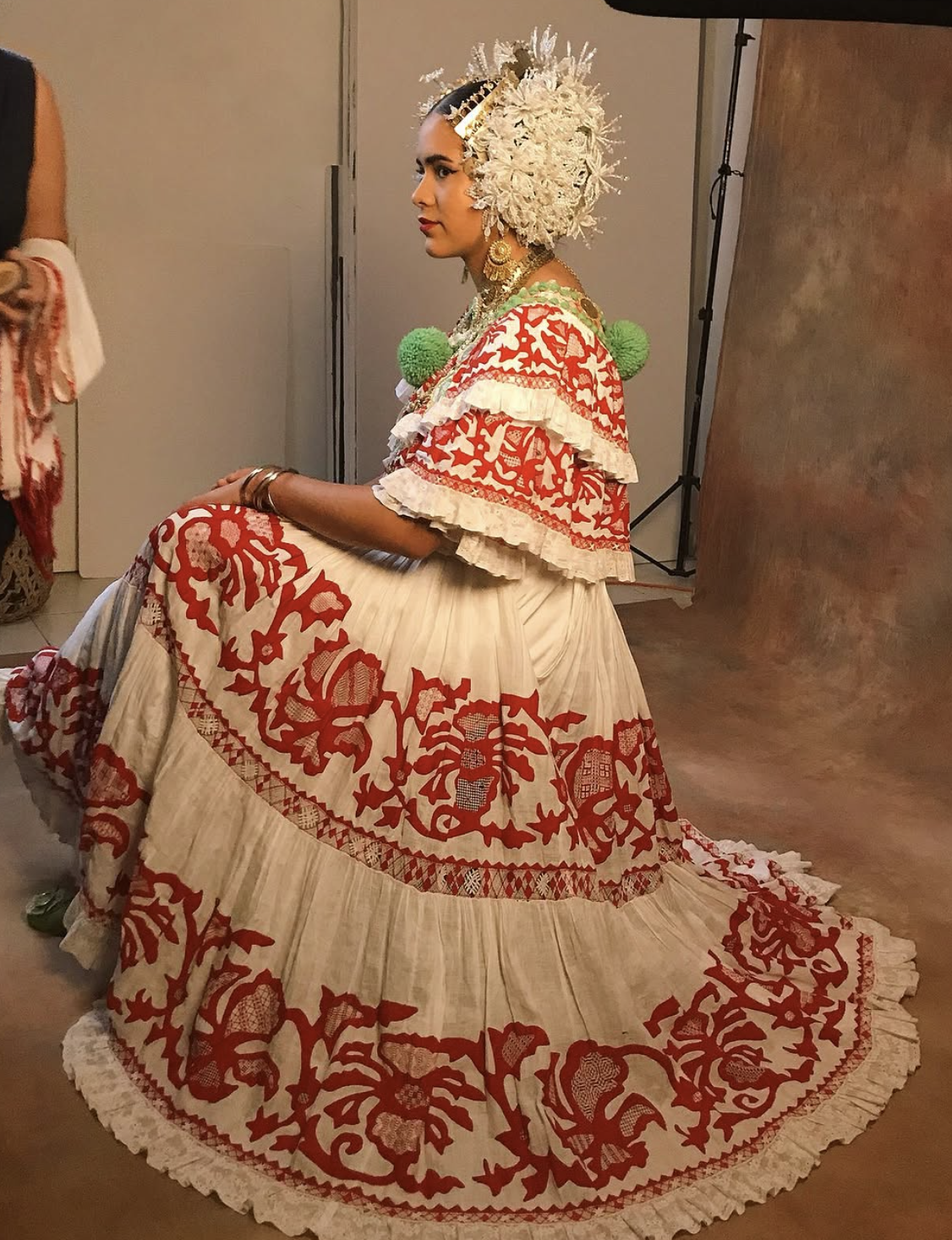
A Panamanian pollera de gala

The Panamanian pollera is recognized as one of the most elaborate traditional garments in the Americas, with origins traced to the attire of Spanish women who arrived during the 16th and 17th centuries. The origins of the pollera are rooted in Spanish colonial influence, but reflect Panama’s broader history as a cultural crossroads shaped by Indigenous, European, and Afro-Antillean traditions and ways of dress. Polleras are traditional garments that serve as Panama’s national dress, particularly associated with the interior provinces of Panama.

The Panamanian pollera consists of a handmade skirt and shirt, crafted by Panamanian artisans in a range of colors and designs. These outfits are often passed down through generations. It is handmade, often on fine-threaded fabric, and features intricate lacework and embroidery using techniques such as darning, cross-stitch, and shaded work. Polleras are typically custom-made, as a proper fit is considered essential. Each pollera type is associated with unique regional customs, elements of jewelry, and methods of adornment, reflecting Panama’s diverse cultural heritage. They are typically classified into two main types: gala (formal) and labor (work), with each region having its variations. The creation of a pollera is time-intensive, often requiring between one and a half to two years to complete.

The Panamanian pollera is internationally recognized for its elaborate designs, vibrant colors, embroidery, lace, metalwork, and craftsmanship. It is considered one of the most beautiful traditional costumes in the world. Polleras are crafted by artisans throughout Panama, with a concentration in the Azuero Peninsula.

The pollera is celebrated during the annual Desfiles de las Mil Polleras in Las Tablas every January, where a wide variety of these garments can be seen together. The continued creation, wearing, and display of polleras reflect Panama’s ongoing process of cultural assimilation and the preservation of traditional crafts within its diverse national identity.

The pollera is mainly made of cotton and linen. Typically, the dominant color is white, and the skirts feature colorful floral designs as embellishments. The three principal artisan techniques used in contemporary Panamanian pollera making are Talco al sol bordada (embroidered sun talc; fabric on fabric technique), Gala de labor zurcida calada (gala of labor, darned and openwork, made with thread), and Marcada (marked).

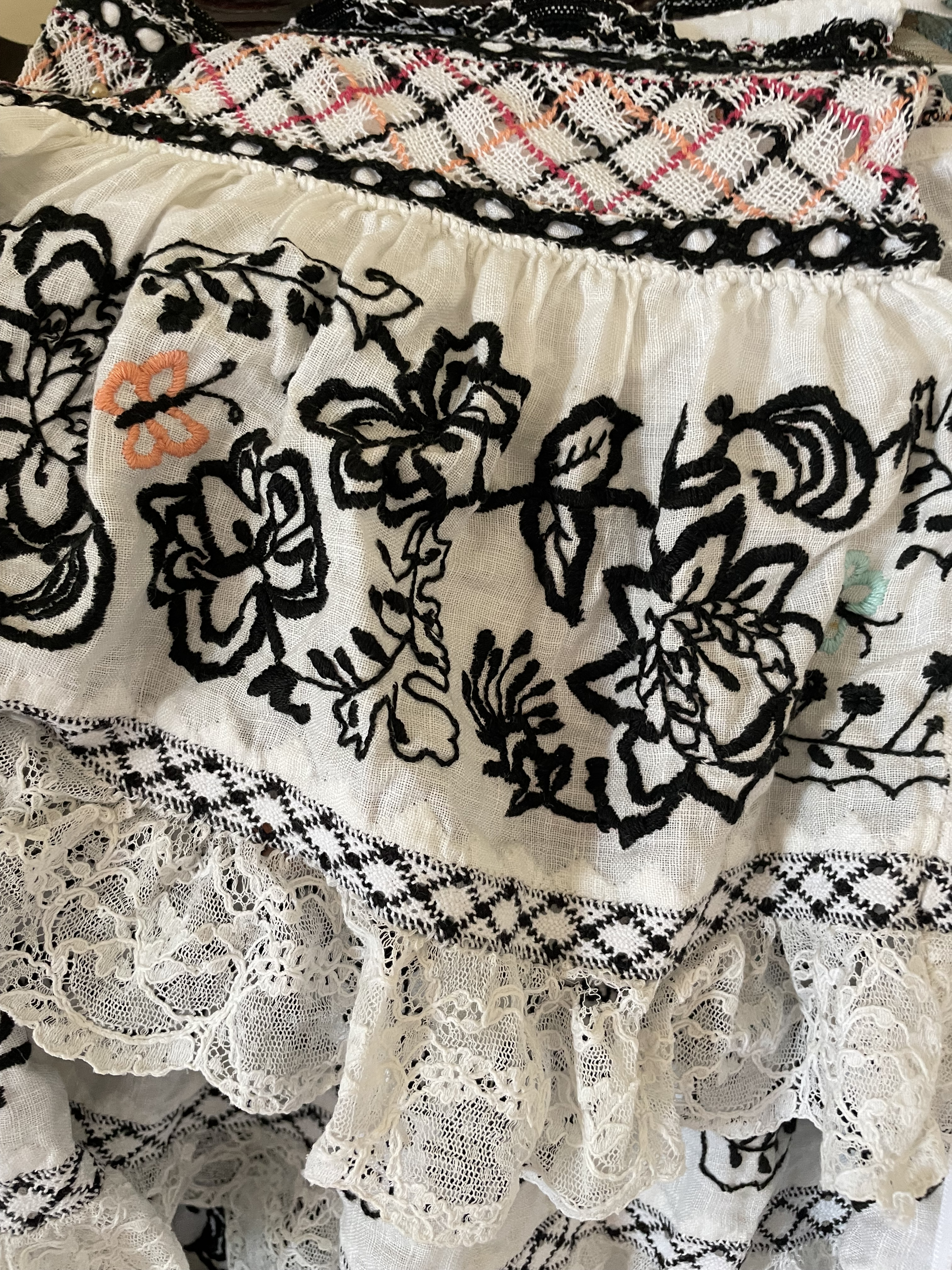
Embroidery in a Panamanian pollera

The price of a pollera can vary widely depending on its materials and embellishments. A marked pollera set—which includes the shirt, skirt, shawl, and fan—typically costs between $10,000 and $12,000. This base price rises with the addition of accessories: gold-plated silver jewelry (seven chains for about $2,500), a set of five combs ($500), and tembleques adorned with pearls and Swarovski crystals ($1,000). Two petticoats, each ranging from $1,000 to $1,500, can bring the total cost to around $18,500, and that figure does not include makeup. If the owner opts for solid gold accessories, the price increases dramatically. For instance, a single flat chain requires roughly 45 grams of gold (about $1,575), meaning the full set of seven chains alone can surpass $10,500. When combined with the marked pollera, combs, tembleques, and petticoats, the overall expense can exceed $26,500. By contrast, second-hand polleras may be found for around $5,000, depending on the quality of their craftsmanship.

=== Pollera de Gala ===
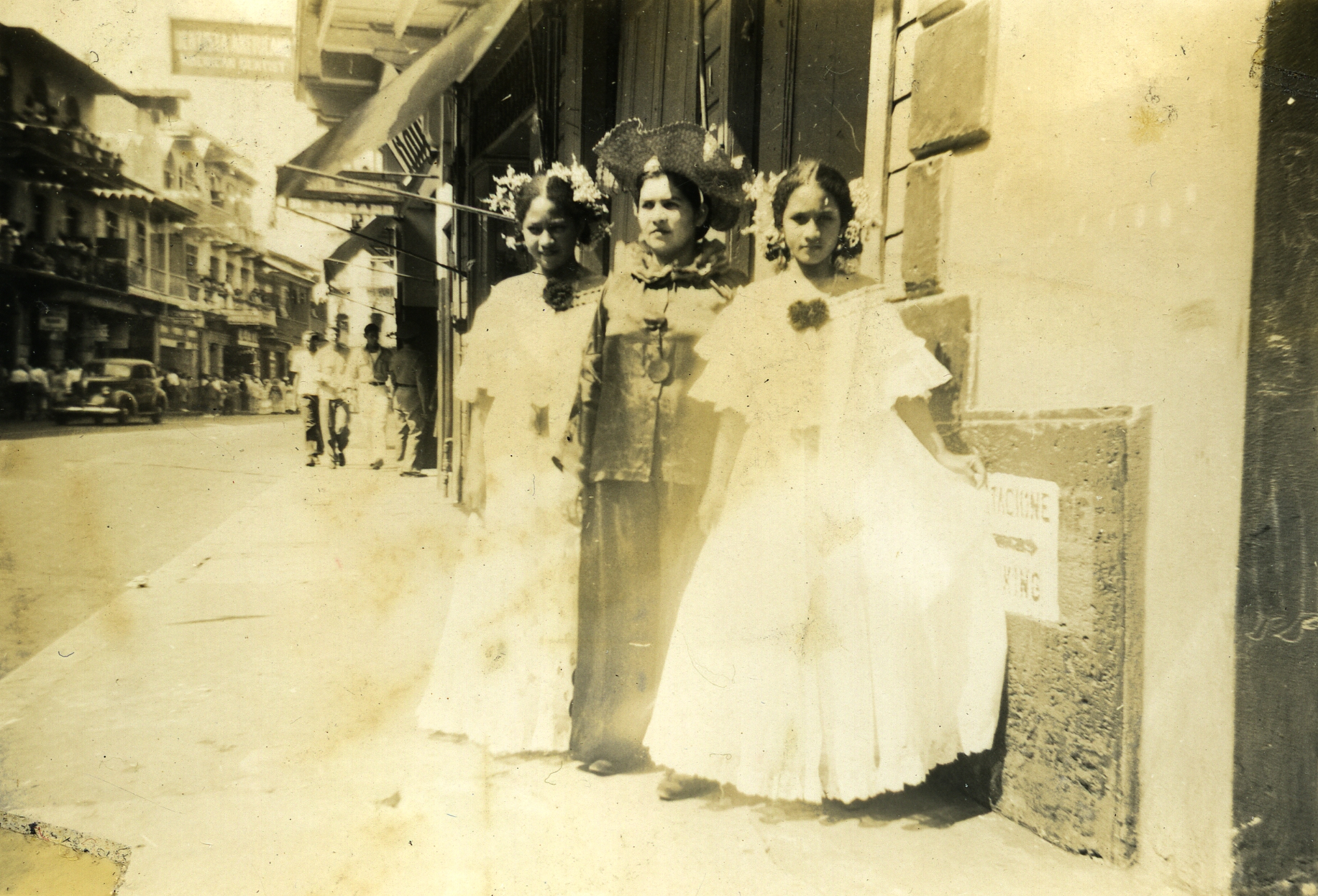
Climactic day of Carnival season, Panama City, Panama, 1946.

The gala, or luxury, pollera is the most ornate and is crafted with Valencian lace and locally made braids. The embroidery covers the entire garment and is often done by eye, making some styles particularly challenging. Variations include the "Talco al sol" (Sun Talc), which involves colored fabric cutwork, and the rarer "Talco en sombra" (Shadow Talc), featuring work beneath the fabric. The formal gala pollera is worn at celebrations such as quinceañeras and weddings, distinguished by its white fabric, white thread embroidery, lace ribbons, and sometimes wool or other fibers. It is accessorized with pearl combs and chains, including religious pieces.

The most expensive versions are the Santeña gala de labor polleras, though prices vary based on the type of labor and regional style.

=== Pollera Montuna or Pollera Zaraza ===
Originally worn for rural activities, the mountain skirt varies by region (e.g., Santeña, Ocú, Veraguas, Penonomé, Antón), with distinctions in shirt style, jewelry, headdress, and hat. The term "montuna" refers to its origins among peasant women from the mountains, but the name "zaraza" is also used, referencing the fabric. Modern festive versions feature increased craftsmanship and flair.

=== Pollera Congo ===
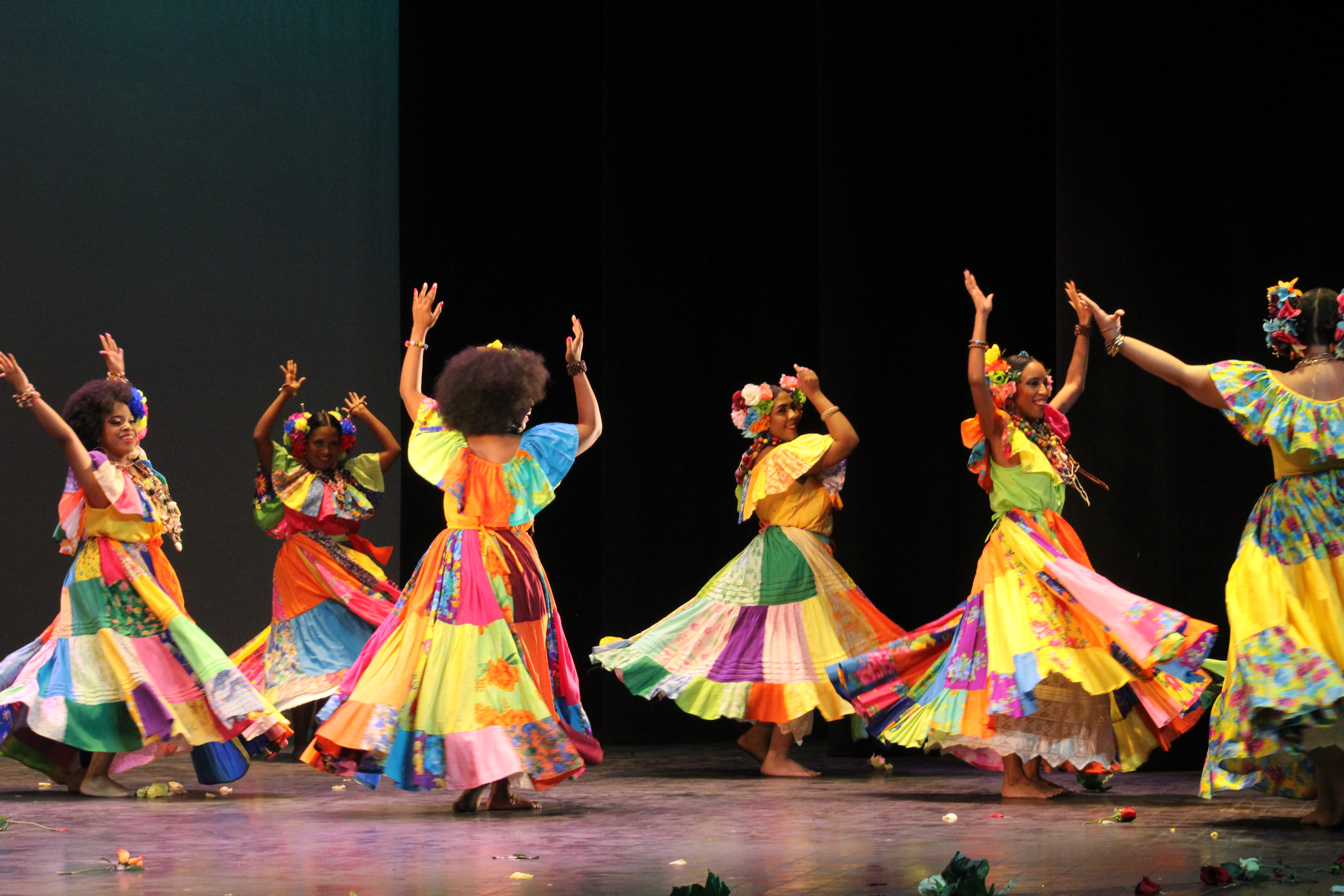
Pollera Congo

This style is part of the Afro-Panamanian tradition, especially in Colón. It is made from a variety of brightly colored fabrics or floral prints, with scraps arranged in a random, yet intentional way. The Congo queen’s attire includes a crown, natural or artificial flowers in the hair, and numerous long necklaces. It is traditional for the Congo dancer to perform barefoot.

=== Pollera con Basquiña ===
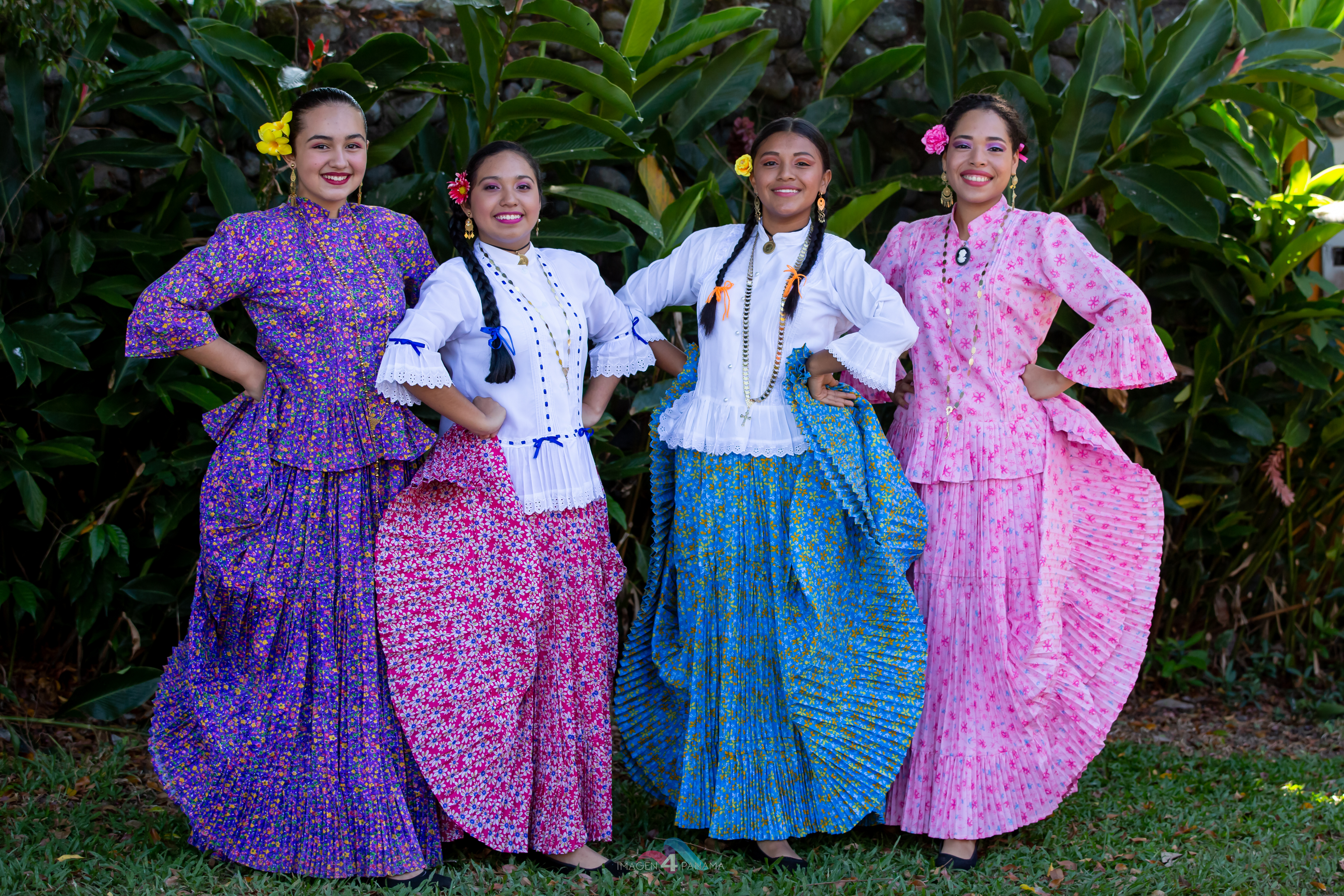
Four woman wearing Basquiñas from Chririqui

The Pollera con basquiña is used in several regions. The basquiña is crafted from fine fabrics, adorned with tucks, braid, and Valencian or thread lace. It is paired with gold or gold-plated silver buttons, chains, and specific traditional jewelry. Hairstyles used for the basquiña avoid single braids and are usually styled in two braids or a bun. Black shoes known as "pana" or "panitas" are typically worn, except in Darién, where the outfit is worn without shoes.

=== Man-tumble Skirt ===
A regional variation, the "Man-tumble" skirt features stripes rather than floral chintz. Its name comes from the visual effect of the stripes when dancing, which is said to disorient a male dancing partner. It is associated with Villa de Los Santos, though its precise origin is debated. This style has gained popularity in recent years, especially in folkloric performances.

== Bolivian and Peruvian polleras ==
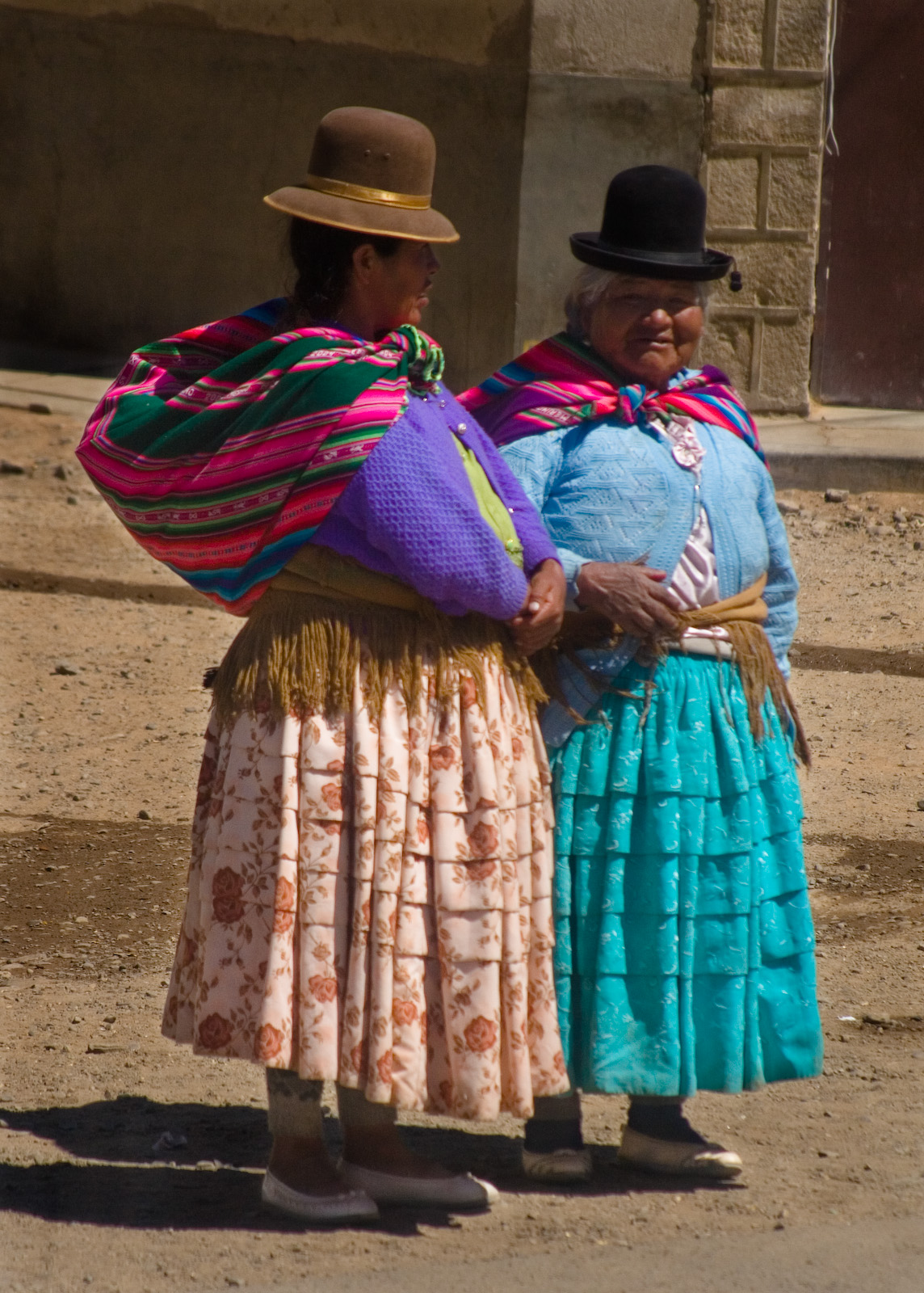
Aymara Women wearing polleras, El Alto, Bolivia

In Bolivia the word pollera denotes a pleated skirt very much associated with the urban mestizo and the rural indigenous classes, where women usually wear this garment (nowadays also instead of the woven indigenous dresses). The urban pollera typical of the Bolivian altiplano should be made of 8 metres (26 ft) of cloth, and it is worn with 4–5 embroidered underskirts.

The skirt worn under the top pollera is called the fuste; under the fuste (in the third skirt) is typically made from wool. Many women still wear this skirt, which originates from Spanish rural dresses and for the Carnaval de Oruro or Virgen de la Candelaría festival in Peru, and other festivities. During traditional festivities women who do not usually wear it will put it on for the dancing.

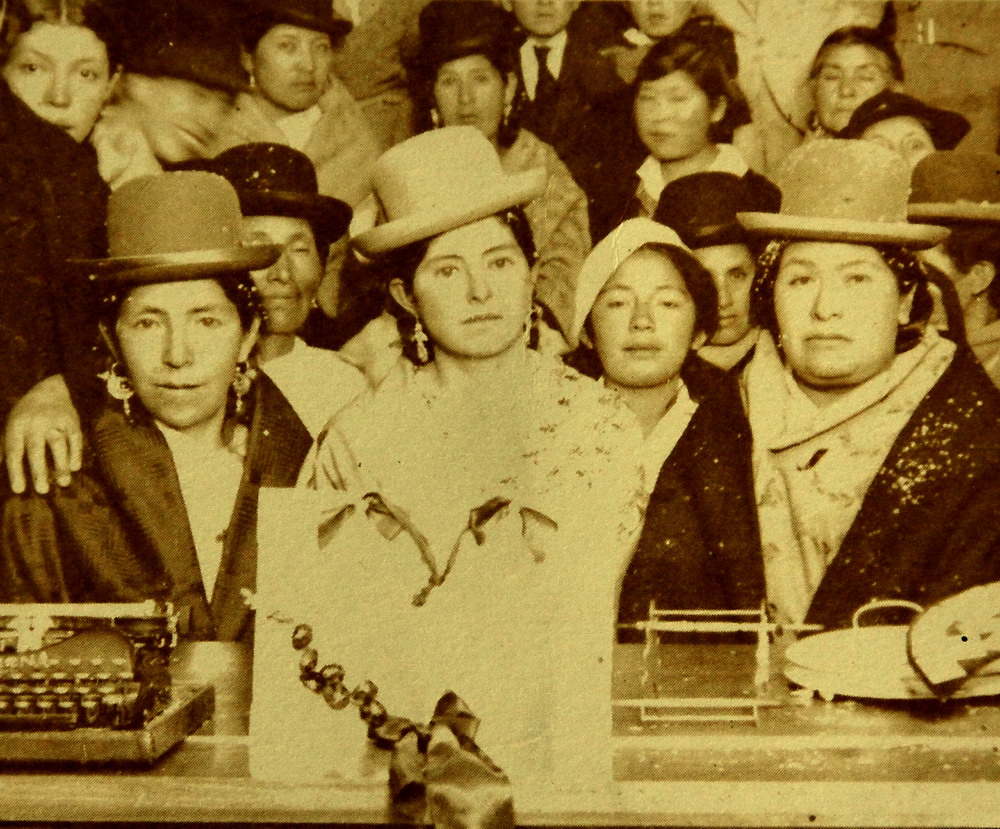
Board of Culinarias Union (Bolivia, 1937). Rosa R. Calderón (left), Peta Infantes (center).

=== Social importance ===
Between the late 1920s and late 1930s in Bolivia, the pollera became a symbol deeply tied to social, gender, and ethnic divisions. In 1929, elite women’s organizations, which defined femininity by motherhood and domesticity, organized a National Women’s Convention. Working-class Indigenous women, also known as "cholas", wearing polleras were present but were marginalized and expelled after presenting demands about labor conditions. This reflected existing class and ethnic hierarchies, with elite women maintaining control over the event and reinforcing a vision of womanhood centered on the home.

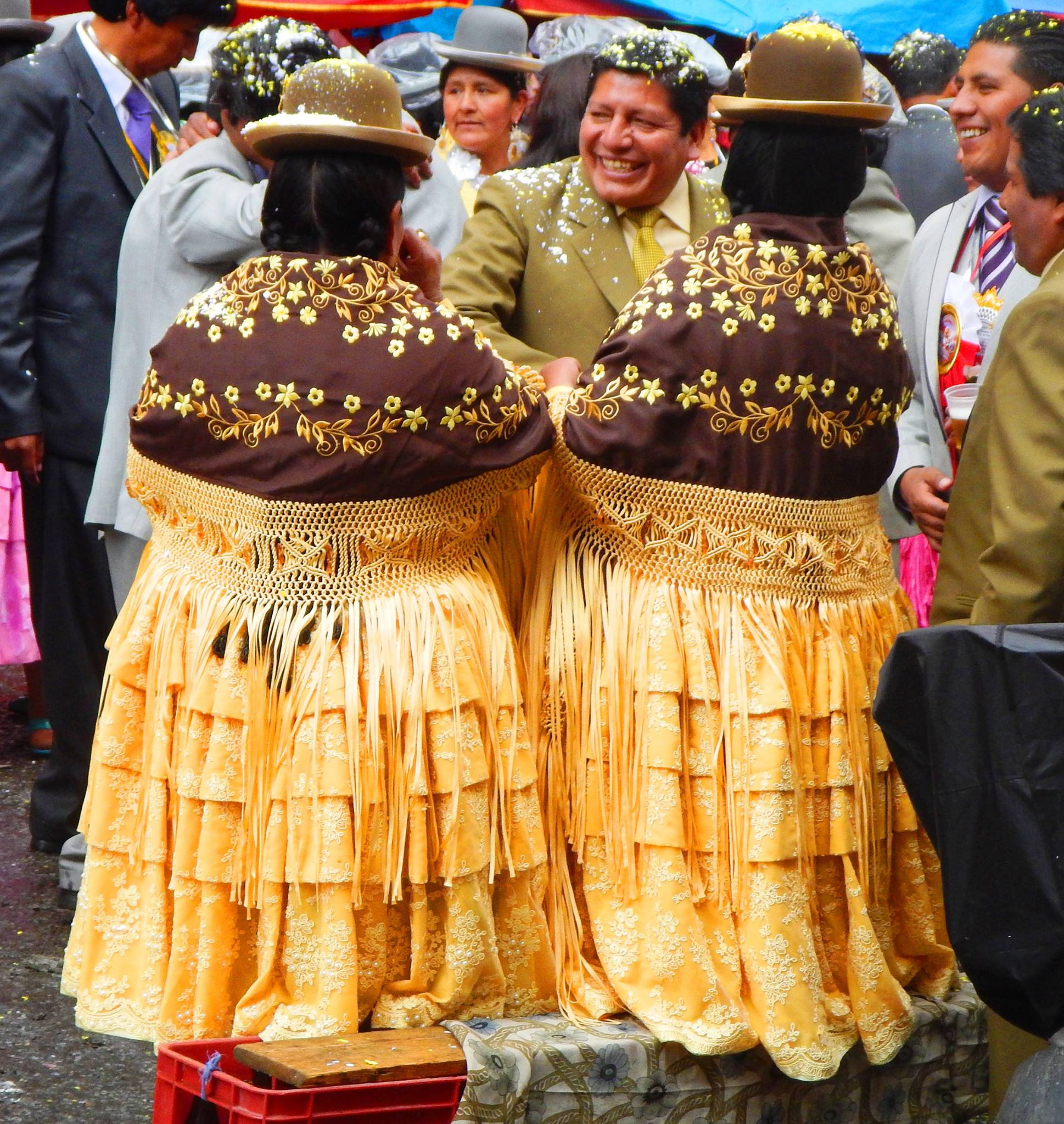
Bolivian Chola women wearing polleras in the festival of El Preste in La Paz, Bolivia

Following the Chaco War (1932–1935), both elite and working-class women’s groups sought public reforms. Elite women, often involved in groups like the Legión Femenina de Educación Popular, justified new public roles by expanding the notion of “maternal duty” beyond the home to “social maternity,” which allowed them to participate in social assistance programs. These efforts, however, established and reproduced class and racial hierarchies, framing working-class women as “daughters” in need of protection.

For Indigenous women, the postwar period marked a time of increased organization and a new nationalist consciousness. They began to assert their identity as Bolivian citizens and demanded rights equal to the elites, often citing their sacrifices during the war. In 1938, thousands of pollera-wearing street vendors publicly demanded new markets after being evicted from the streets; their activism, supported by labor unions, used nationalist language and was successful in obtaining concessions.

During this period, state and elite control over Indigenous women increased. The pollera became a visible signifier for regulatory practices targeting cholas. In 1935, the police began requiring working-class women in polleras, such as domestic workers and cooks, to obtain health and identification cards, which involved rough and invasive medical exams. These measures were justified by medical discourses that portrayed Indigenous women as unhealthy, dirty, or sexually immoral, independent of their actual living conditions. Indigenous women resisted these attempts at regulation and acculturation, continuing to wear the pollera as an expression of Aymara identity and community values, despite pressure to adopt Western dress. The pollera thus served as a symbol of resistance to both cultural assimilation and state control. Indigenous women viewed the forced removal of their traditional clothing as an attack on their ethnic identity and a form of sexual exploitation.

The pollera’s significance extended beyond opposition to elites; it also played a role within the Indigenous and working-class communities, serving as a marker of identity and internal differentiation. For some, such as anarchist Petronila Infantes, donning the pollera marked a turning point in their lives, often tied to economic necessity and social transformation.

=== Skateboarding in polleras ===
ImillaSkate is an all-female Indigenous Bolivian skateboarding crew formed in Cochabamba in 2019 that wears polleras while skateboarding. Imilla means "young girl" in Aymara and Quechua. The members of the group were inspired by their mothers and grandmothers to wear traditional Indigenous clothing, including Bolivian pollera skirts, beribboned bowler hats, and long twisted braids. The pollera, in this instance, symbolizes the struggle and strength of past generations of Indigenous women, representing Indigenous heritage while challenging gender and cultural barriers in skateboarding.

At the 2024 Smithsonian Folklife Festival in Washington, D.C., the group wore polleras and performed skateboarding to attendees as part of the Indigenous Voices of the Americas theme. The group’s public performances and workshops aim to inspire both young girls and boys to participate in skateboarding and to recognize and value their cultural identity.

== See also ==
- La Verne M. Seales Soley (30 December 2008). Culture and Customs of Panama. ABC-CLIO. pp. 35–37. ISBN 978-0-313-05636-9.
- Edgardo Abraham León Madariaga (1 January 1992). La pollera, traje nacional de Panamá (in Spanish). Everest. ISBN 978-84-241-9809-1.
