= Local Workers' Federation =

Bolivian trade union federation

- Federación Obrera Local
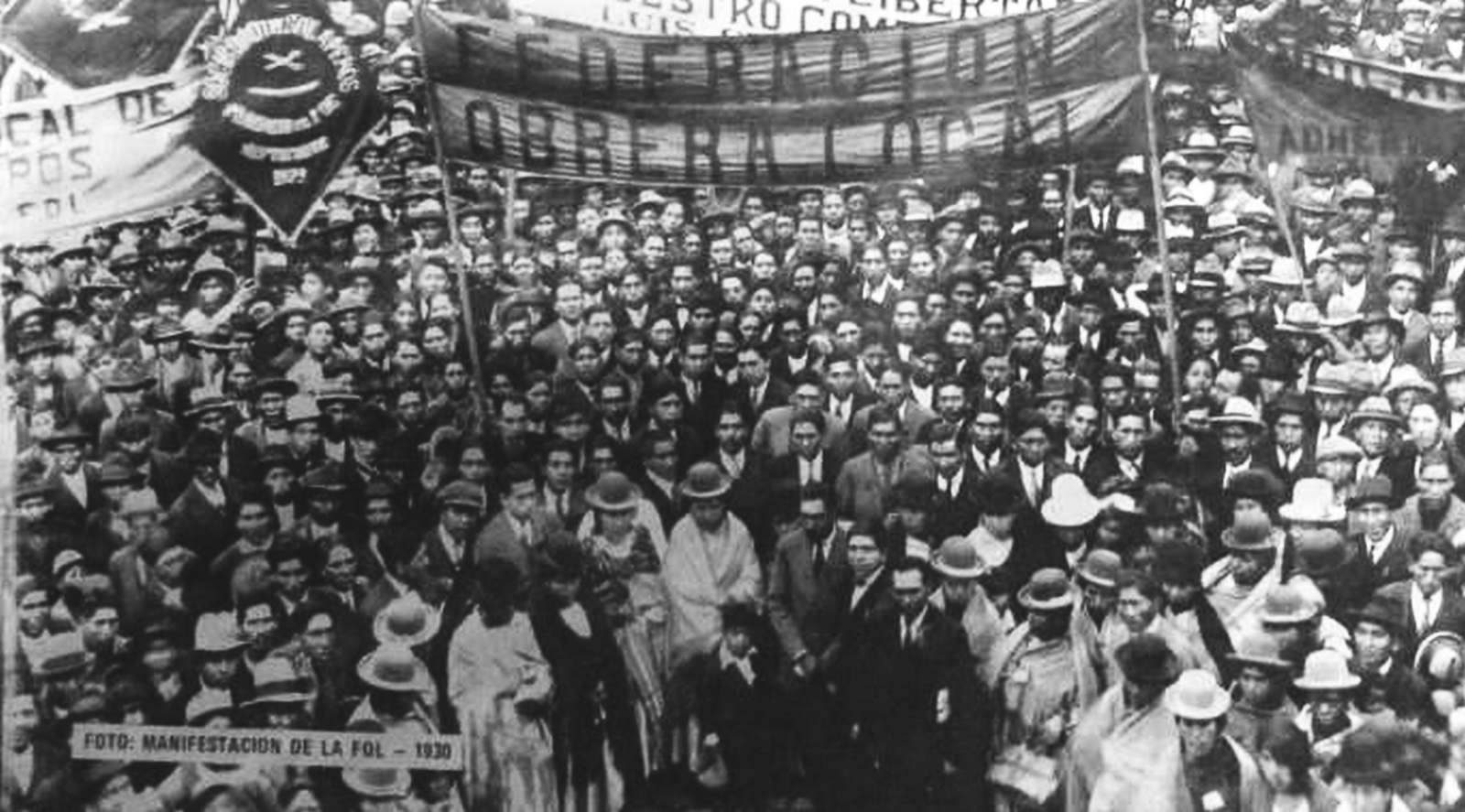
- FOL demonstration in La Paz in 1930
- Abbreviation: FOL
- Merged into: Bolivian Workers' Center
- Formation: 1926; 100 years ago
- Dissolved: 1953; 73 years ago
- Type: Trade union federation
- Location: La Paz, Bolivia
- Coordinates: 16°29′45″S 68°08′00″W
- Members: 50,000 (1947)
- General Secretary: Luciano Vertíz Blanco
- Main organ: La Humanidad (1928)
- Affiliations: International Workers' Association; American Continental Workers' Association

The Local Workers' Federation (Spanish: Federación Obrera Local; (Note: Also translated as Local Labour Federation.) FOL) was a Bolivian anarcho-syndicalist trade union federation, based in La Paz. Established in 1926 by anarchist trade unions from several sectors, it quickly grew to become the leading trade union organization in the Bolivian capital, attracting the adhesion of the city's predominantly indigenous working class. It established a Women Workers' Federation in 1927, led a strike for an eight-hour working day in 1928 and participated in the formation of the American Continental Workers' Association in 1929. By the time of the Great Depression, the FOL had gained the support of trade unions in Oruro, led the formation of a national trade union confederation and made plans to carry out a social revolution against the government, but each of these efforts were suppressed following the rise of a military dictatorship in the country.

The FOL was driven underground during the Chaco War, but reorganized shortly after the Bolivian defeat and participated in the 1936 Bolivian coup d'état, which established a socialist state in the country. Due to its anarchist orientation, the FOL quickly came into conflict with the new government. Following the 1946 La Paz riots, which the FOL took a leading role in, the anarchists re-consolidated their control over the city's labor movement. They also established the Departmental Agrarian Federation, which organized indigenous rural workers in the region and led a rebellion against large landowners and the government. The rebellion was suppressed and the FOL went into a decline. Following the Bolivian National Revolution of 1952, it merged into the Bolivian Workers' Center, which became the main trade union federation in the country.

== Background ==
The origin of the Bolivian labor movement dates back to 1848, with the rise to power of President Manuel Isidoro Belzu, who supported artisans' organizations and extended them protection. The modern labor movement emerged in the 1870s, with the establishment of the first benefit societies by workers in the country's mining industry. Following the Bolivian Civil War of 1899, the Liberal Party seized power and oversaw the rapid expansion of the country's tin mining industry, with backing from British and American investors. The Liberals also encouraged the formation of the country's first trade unions, which took shape in La Paz during the 1900s. By 1908, some of these trade unions had come together to establish the Workers' Federation of La Paz (Spanish: Federación Obrera de La Paz; FOLP), which allied itself with the Liberal Party, and held the country's first International Workers' Day demonstration.

Some workers became disillusioned FOLP's alliance with the liberals, and in 1914, formed the rival International Workers' Federation (Spanish: Federación Obrera Internacional; FOI), which was influenced by socialism and anarchism. The FOI considered trade unionism to be a way for workers to organize against capitalism and achieve the unity of the working class. By 1918, most trade unions in La Paz had affiliated to the FOI, which reorganized itself into the Workers' Federation of Labor (Spanish: Federación Obrera del Trabajo; FOT). Initially influenced by a "curious mixture of reformism and anarchism", the FOT turned its attention to demanding the eight-hour working day and various human rights. However, it later fell under Marxist control.

Working class opposition to the Liberal regime culminated with the 1920 Bolivian coup d'état, during which the socialist Bautista Saavedra seized power. Over the subsequent decade, trade unions throughout the country made a series of attempts to establish a national trade union federation, tentatively called the National Confederation of Labor (Spanish: Confederación Nacional del Trabajo; CNT), but each of them were unsuccessful due in part to internal divisions. By the late 1920s, the Bolivian labor movement was split into Marxist-Leninist, socialist republican and anarchist camps.

== Establishment ==
Anarchism had been the dominant tendency among Latin American social movements since the beginning of the 20th century, with anti-authoritarian philosophy finding fertile ground among indigenous anti-colonial movements. Anarchist ideas came to Bolivia through Spanish literature, brought by workers from Argentina, Chile and particularly Peru. Political repression accelerated the spread of anarchist ideas and groups in the country, with the 1923 Uncía massacre provoking the formation of an organized anarchist movement. Anarchist ideology gained support among Bolivia's indigenous and cholo population, who organized their own trade unions. Bolivian anarchists developed the concept of an "inclusive nation", based on cultural and gender diversity, which they aimed to establish through union organizing and agitation. They mostly organized among artisans, employees in small businesses, and street vendors. Left-wing intellectuals from the cities also began reaching out to the rural peasantry, offering them legal protection and helping establish Ferrer schools to educate indigenous communities. Anarchists in La Paz established mutual aid networks, provided legal aid to rural caciques and wrote to the foreign anarchist press to denounce the treatment of indigenous workers in Bolivia. After the repression of the Peruvian Regional Workers' Federation in 1924, its leaders, Francisco Gamarra Navarro and Paulino Aguilar, were deported to Bolivia, where they helped build its growing anarcho-syndicalist movement.

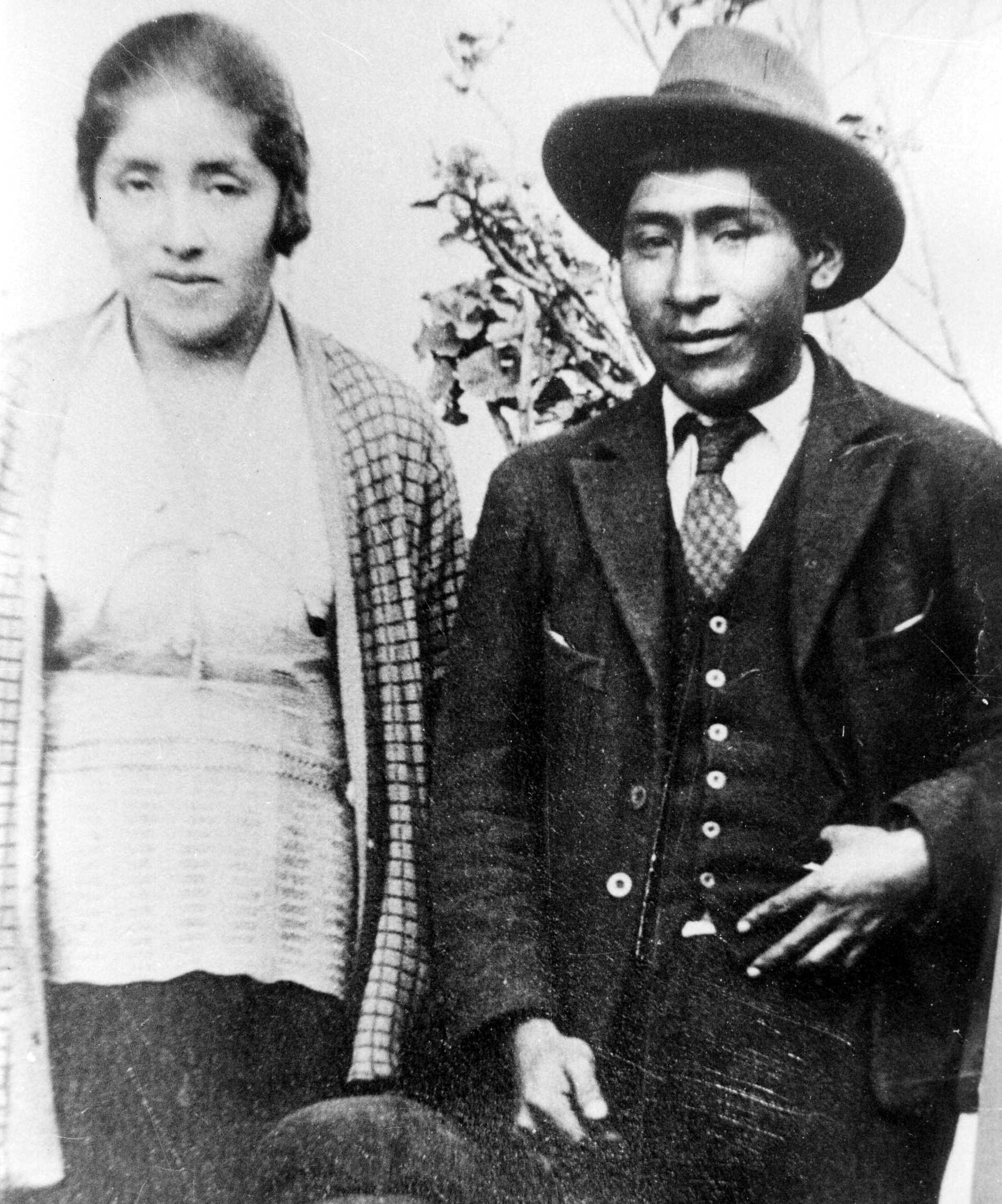
FOL co-founders Domitila Pareja and Luis Cusicanqui, c. 1926

The anarchists soon became the predominant force in La Paz. There, in 1926, anarchist trade unions came together to establish the Local Workers' Federation (Spanish: Federación Obrera Local; FOL). They hoped it could form the basis for a national trade union federation and a libertarian alternative to the Marxist-Leninist FOT. The name was chosen to reflect its self-conception as the local Bolivian branch of the International Workers' Association (AIT). The FOL initially counted 12 trade unions, largely from the industrial and service sectors. It quickly grew to count 38 trade union affiliates – notably including the local carpenters', construction workers' and tailors' unions – making it the largest union federation in La Paz. Its affiliate unions outnumbered those of the local branch of the FOT by more than 3-to-1. Following a federative structure, FOL sections were considered autonomous organizations and maintained their own decision-making powers. It had a relatively young membership, with its members' average age being 30. It also attracted the affiliation of the anarchist group Despertar. The FOL soon became the leading trade union federation in Bolivia.

The general secretary of the FOL was Luciano Vertíz Blanco, an anarchist who had been the treasurer of the FOT and a prominent advocate of the eight-hour working day during the early 1920s. Two delegates were elected by each affiliated union to form the FOL's governing body, while a separate Federal Council was formed by anarchist members to ensure the organization maintained its ideological purity; labor historian Robert J. Alexander compared the set-up to the relationship between the National Confederation of Labor and the Iberian Anarchist Federation in Spain. Alexander, who met leaders of the FOL in 1947, said that although they "were not too strong on anarchist doctrine, they did certainly stick to the main organizational principles of anarchosyndicalist unionism—avoidance of partisan political action and emphasis on direct action". The FOL upheld anarcho-syndicalist methods and anarcho-communist ideological principles. Following the founding principle of the First International, the anarchist FOL believed that "the emancipation of the working class must be achieved by the workers themselves". They aimed to abolish not only capitalism, but all forms of hierarchy and exploitation; their goal was to establish a decentralized political and economic system characterized by autonomy, liberty and social ownership, with workers' control of the means of production.

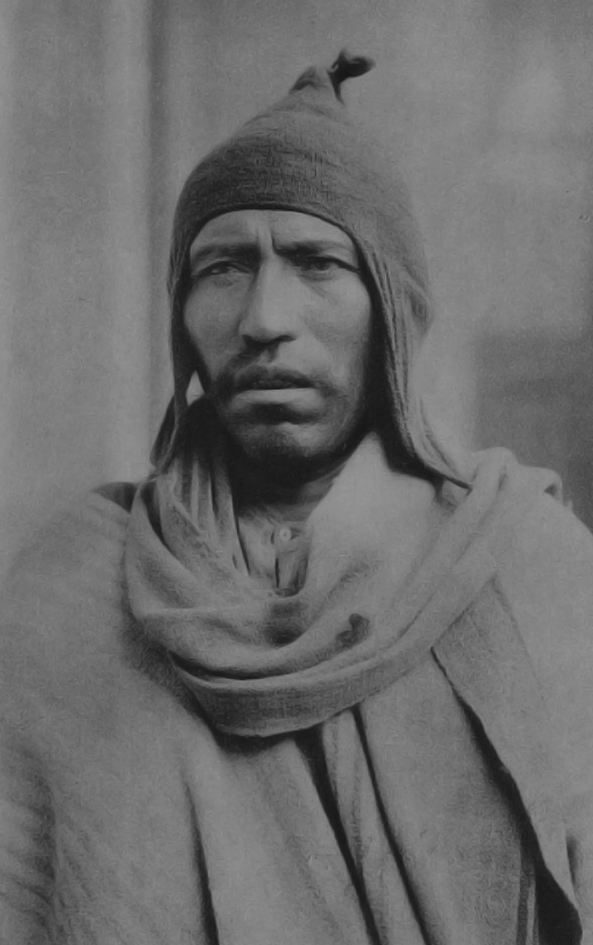
Santos Marka T'ula, an Aymara cacique and ally of the FOL

Although principally an anarchist organization, the FOL was also sympathetic to indigenism, due to its predominantly indigenous and cholo membership. The libertarian socialism of the FOL was attentive to both ethnic and class struggles, which together with its democratic and federalist organizational structure, made it particularly favorable to coalition building. Anarcho-syndicalism's emphasis on trade unions was woven together with indigenous ayllu networks, to form a counter to the Bolivian state and dominant society; Bolivian historian Silvia Rivera Cusicanqui referred to this synthesis as "ch'ixi anarcho-syndicalism". One of the organization's founders was the Aymara anarchist Luis Cusicanqui, a mechanic by trade, who often wrote about indigenous struggles against racism and landlordism. He called for urban and rural workers to join together in a revolution against what he considered to be a fundamentally racist state, led by a predominantly mestizo elite, and defined indigeneity in terms of political marginalization and oppression. Through Cusicanqui, the indigenous rights activist Santos Marka T'ula made ties with the FOL, having found allies among the anarchists against the white supremacist Bolivian elite, and helped to organize peasants' unions based on their traditional ayllu structures. Indigenous labor activist Toribio Miranda distrusted white leftist activists, who largely attempted to incorporate working class and indigenous peoples into political party structures, and instead built ties with the anarchists of the FOL.

== Early activities ==
The main focus of the FOL during the late 1920s was its fight for the eight-hour day. It united both artisans and wage laborers behind this goal; even some small business owners supported the movement, despite it being against their own self-interests, as they hoped to help end exploitation. In late 1928, Vertíz Blanco led a strike which forced the Bolivian authorities to grant workers the eight-hour day. The FOL also established spaces for self-education, knowledge sharing and socialising.

=== Women Workers' Federation ===
Over time, the markets of La Paz had become a space for women workers to build solidarity with each other. Indigenous pollera women had first began involving themselves in protest and activism in the early 1900s, and during the late 1920s, began organizing women in the workforce into militant trade unions to demand full citizenship and equal rights. Anarchist ideology was appealing to them, due to its opposition to gender inequality and domestic violence. In April 1927, anarchist women established the General Women Workers' Union (Spanish: Sindicato Feminino de Oficios Varios; SFOV), which brought together women workers of various trades, particularly cooks and flower vendors, and affiliated itself with the FOL. As the SFOV grew, it was reorganized into the Women Workers' Federation (Spanish: Federación Obrera Femenina; FOF), which remained affiliated with the FOL.

The FOF became the leading women's organization in La Paz, forming unions of women workers in the city's various markets. Members of the FOF rejected attempts by male anarchists to interfere in their autonomous organization, asserting that only women themselves could secure their own rights, educate themselves and their children, and ensure progress towards a "Fatherland worth living in". It organized childcare, cultural events, literacy education and library access for women, particularly from Aymara backgrounds. It agitated for women's rights, including the right to divorce, and equal rights for illegitimate children. It also protested against violence by the authorities against street vendors, who were often abused by police.

The FOF largely consisted of indigenous women, who had come into conflict with municipal authorities and upper-class White Bolivians. When delegates of the FOF attended the National Women's Convention in 1929, they were met with hostility and forced to withdraw. They protested against their exclusion from decision-making, which had resulted in the passage of resolutions for a female identity card and the imposition of Catholic religious imagery in schools. Petronila Infantes claimed that the white upper-class women had been offended by having to mix with indigenous working class women. Through the FOF, pollera women became visible participants in FOL demonstrations, with historian Linda Seligman calling them "legendary figures of working-class political solidarity". As the FOF grew, establishing unions among milkmaids and farm workers, the FOL became an increasingly flat organization, with male anarchists losing their dominant position. Indigenous women would rise to become the leading force in the Bolivian anarchist movement.

=== Press and external relations ===
In April 1928, the FOL established the weekly newspaper La Humanidad as its official organ. The paper characterized the FOL as a "libertarian syndicalist" organization, which it contrasted with the "red syndicalism" that sought to establish a communist state and the "yellow syndicalism" that collaborated with the ruling class. La Humanidad denounced attempts to bring the labor movement into parliamentary politics, which it considered a danger to the aspirations of the working class. The first issues of the newspaper caused a scandal within the anarchist movement, as it used the honorific of "señor" to refer to its editorial staff; the honorifics were removed from the fifth issue onwards. In subsequent issues, authors analyzed the "social question" in the Bolivian context, called for workers to organize themselves into unions and campaigned for a boycott of the "bourgeois press". But the paper never achieved a wide enough circulation to meet its costs, and by the seventh issue, the newspaper was reporting a financial deficit of 141 bolivianos. The paper soon ceased publication, and was later replaced with La Libertad.

In May 1929, a delegate from the FOL and delegates from the La Paz anarchist newspapers La Antorcha and Luz y Libertad, attended a continental congress in Buenos Aires, where they participated in the establishment of the American Continental Workers' Association (ACAT). Luis Cusicanqui, along with Jacinto Centellas and Modesto Escobar, were arrested in June 1929 for issuing a manifesto calling for an indigenous uprising in rural areas. FOF women led protests against the arrests outside the Palacio Quemado, where around 100 of them were arrested and many more beaten by police; in a manifesto written after the repression of the protest, the FOF declared that "the times when women used to fall to their knees are over" and called on other women to join them in fighting the state.

In other parts of Bolivia, anarchists acted as an internal opposition within other trade union federations. Opportunistic tactics by Marxist groups to seize leadership of the labor movement drove more unions towards the anarchists. The FOL in La Paz gained the support from the predominantly anarcho-syndicalist unions in Oruro. On 23 March 1930, they reorganized the Oruro branch of the FOT into a disciplined mass organization, following the model of the FOL. It was led by union organizers who had received experience working with the Chilean Industrial Workers of the World (IWW-C) and the Argentine Regional Workers' Federation (FORA). The Oruro FOT focused on organizing miners, successfully forming unions in the mines of San José and Huanini, and like their counterparts in La Paz, also organized a women's union for market workers. Shortly after the Oruro FOT declared itself to be a libertarian communist and syndicalist organization, on 10 June 1930, the Bolivian police raided its headquarters and arrested its leaders.

=== Response to the Great Depression ===
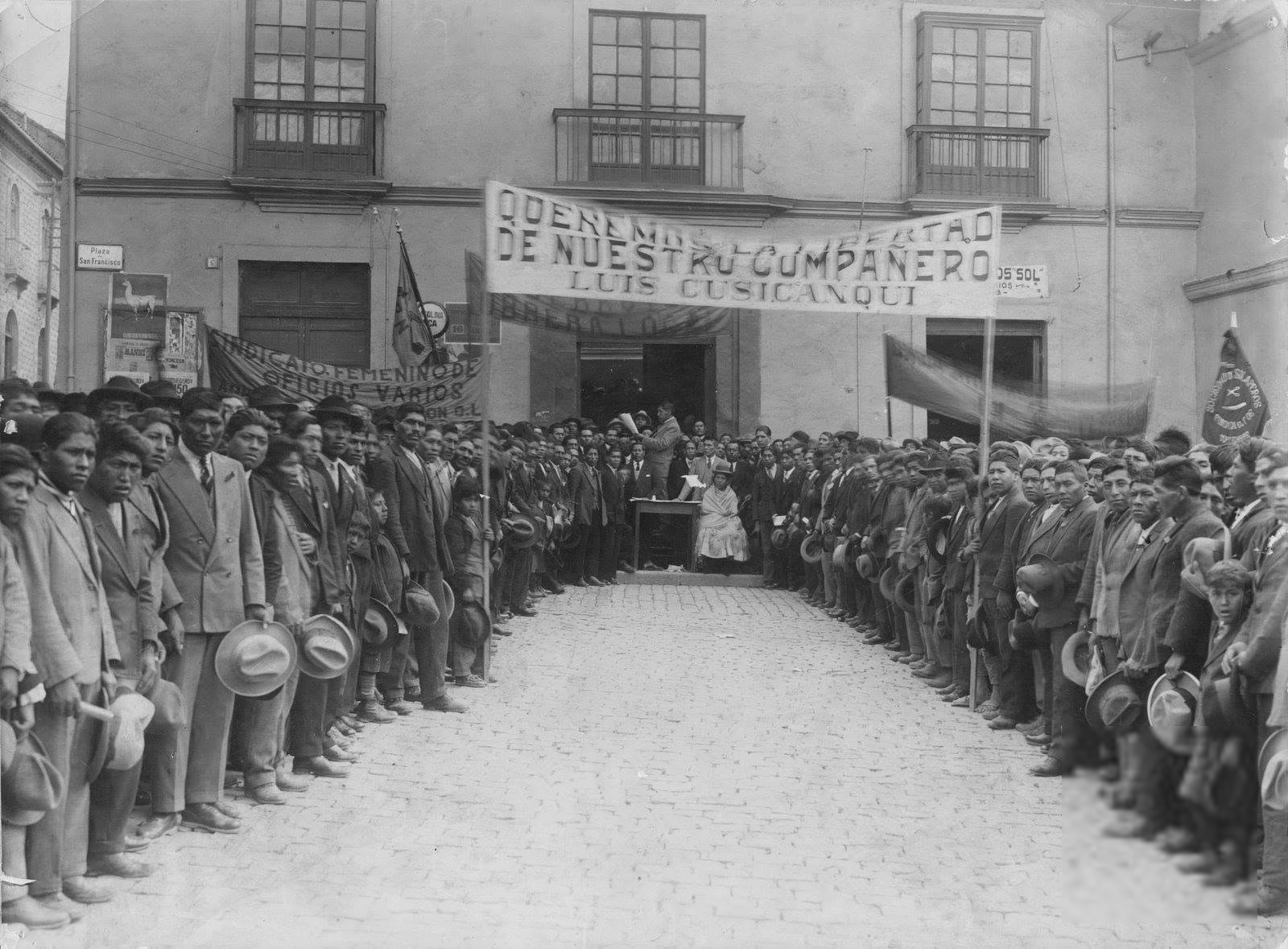
1930 International Workers' Day demonstration by the FOL, demanding the release of Luis Cusicanqui from prison

By 1930, the Great Depression had spread to Bolivia, causing a sharp rise in unemployment and a military coup by Carlos Blanco Galindo, who oversaw an increase in political repression. The FOL led the struggle against unemployment and hunger. Anarchist mass meetings became increasingly common throughout Bolivia, open clashes between protestors and police occurred in La Paz, and unemployed workers attacked hotels and restaurants in Oruro. Amidst this economic and political crisis, the FOL began making plans to carry out a revolution, which won the support of a Carabineer regiment and part of the Colorados Regiment. In Oruro, anarchists collaborated with Marxists to win support for a revolutionary coup from the Camacho Regiment.

Although the FOL leadership was split over the planned uprising, with Carlos Calderón and Demetrio Osuna cautioning that they were not prepared for a revolution, and Huerta worrying it could create a dictatorship, Luis Cusicanqui and Pablo Maras convinced their comrades to push forward. They believed their uprising, if successful, would spark a revolutionary wave throughout South America. Led by Cusicanqui, the conspirators dispatched three armed groups to take control of key points around the city and set off dynamite to signal the beginning of the rebellion; once the explosions were heard, mutineers in the Miraflores barracks would open the doors and distribute weapons to the revolutionaries. However, a loyalist squadron of the Colorados was warned about the planned uprising by an informant, and after the explosion sounded, they arrested the conspirators, as well as bystanders and 27 mutinous soldiers. Other rebel squadrons were shot at and dispersed. Only one of the groups was able to escape capture, while the rest were taken to the Panopticon prison.

In the wake of the unrest, on 5 August 1930, delegates from the CNT requested permission from the military government to hold a national labor congress. The proposed Fourth Labor Congress, which was to be held in Oruro, received backing from the FOL and the local anarcho-syndicalist branch of the FOT. This would be the fourth such congress, with the previous three having been unsuccessful. But the anarchists considered it to be the first congress of its type, as they had not attended the previous three. When the Congress opened on 6 August, it quickly became clear that the anarcho-syndicalists held a majority, so the FOT delegations from Potosí and La Paz walked out. The congress was subsequently dominated by the anarchists, who voted to reorganize the CNT into the Bolivian Regional Workers' Confederation (Spanish: Confederación Obrera Regional Boliviana; CORB) and affiliate the new organization with the AIT. However, the Confederation only received support from the FOL and Oruro FOT, and was boycotted by the Communist-led unions; the fourth Congress had only resulted in greater division within the labor movement. The anarchists soon became the main target of the military government's repression, with the FOL headquarters being shut down on 4 October 1931 and the leaders of the women's union being arrested.

== Repression and revival ==
=== Chaco War ===
With the outbreak of the Chaco War, a series of coups brought the country under a military dictatorship. Although most unions sought to maintain neutrality in the conflict, some chose to support the war, with the FOL bricklayers' union remarking that "the declaration of war and the great outburst of chauvinist propaganda achieved what bayonets could not: the workers abandoned the organization and the struggle and enrolled in the army to go to the Chaco." A minority of unions opposed the war, with both anarchists and communists holding anti-war demonstrations in La Paz, for which eight of the organizers were executed by shooting. The La Paz anarchists considered the war to be one waged by the "militarist castes of both countries", and called for workers not to fight in it, but to instead oppose the "Fatherland of the rich" and "wage war on war". The Oruro FOT also denounced the war at meetings and in manifestoes, in which they accused Bolivia's white ruling class of being "anti-patriots" who had "sold the national territory in tatters" and "mortgag[ed] the rest to North American bankers", and called for a social revolution against them.

The government suspended civil and political rights and launched a generalized crackdown against the labor movement, breaking up strikes, shutting down unions and imprisoning, exiling or conscripting their leaders. All unions were ordered to cease their activities and the nascent CORB was suppressed, with police arresting its leaders. The FOF was also disbanded during the war. The FOL was driven underground and began plotting to overthrow the government of Daniel Salamanca. 200 delegates from trade unions, army units and indigenous groups met at a clandestine conference to plan the revolution, but according to some members of the FOL, Modesto Escobar turned informant and handed the plans over to the government, which cracked down on the conspiracy in January 1933.

Although the FOL would survive the war, its counterparts in the Regional Workers' Center of Paraguay were completely suppressed by the Paraguayan government. The FOL was one of only a few Latin American anarcho-syndicalist organizations, along with the Chilean General Confederation of Workers and the Uruguayan Regional Workers' Federation, that survived the political repression of the 1930s. Bolivia itself would be one of the only countries where anarchism remained the dominant left-wing tendency, at a time when Marxism was displacing it throughout the world. However, neither the Bolivian anarchists nor the labor movement would fully recovered from the repression during the war.

=== Reorganization ===
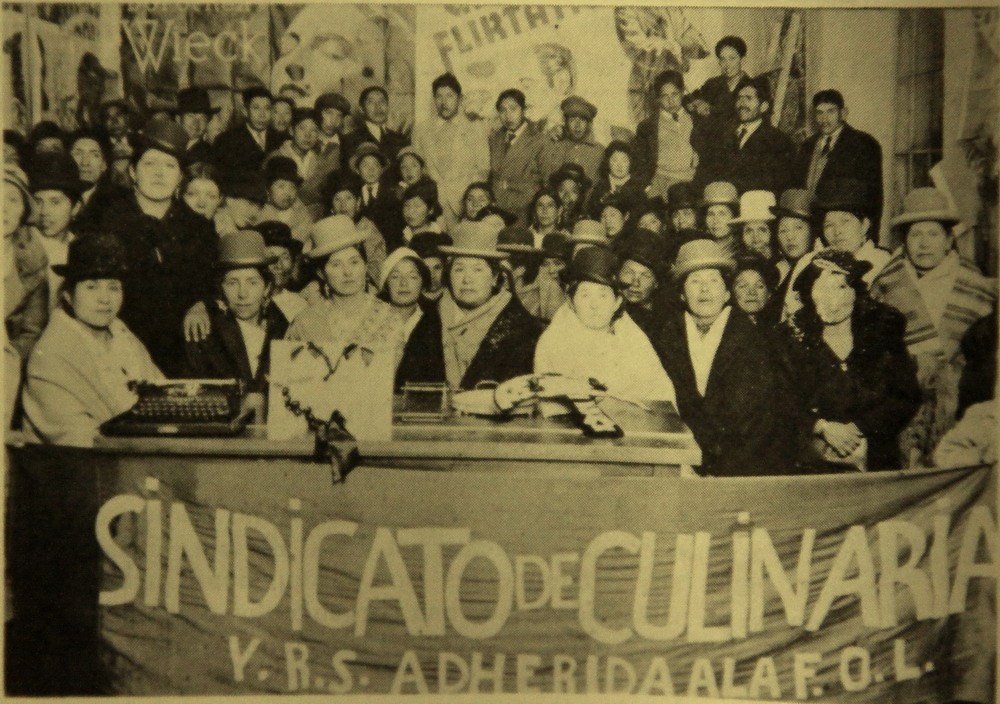
The Cooks' Union of the FOL in 1937

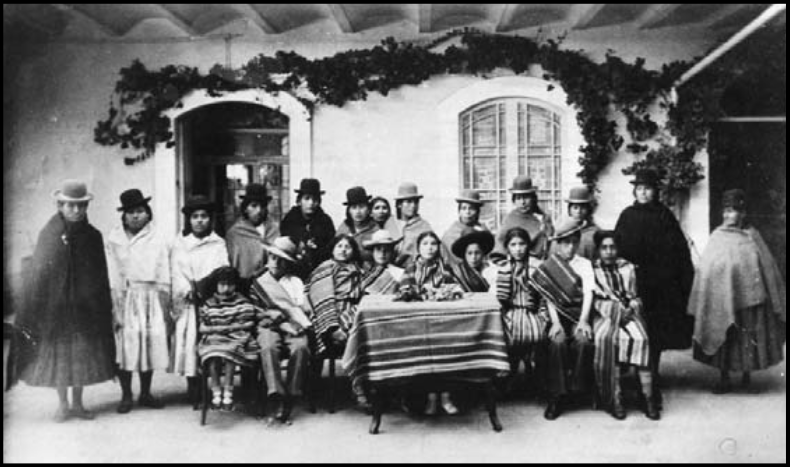
The Flower Vendors' Union of the FOL in 1936

During the war, the Bolivian state mobilized 250,000 men, most of whom were indigenous workers and urban artisans; more than 50,000 of them were killed and 25,000 more were taken prisoner. Bolivia ultimately lost the war, and was forced to cede its territory in the Chaco region. Bolivia's defeat provoked widespread opposition to the military government, with middle-class officers blaming the government's corruption and incompetence for their defeat, while rank-and-file soldiers returned from the front and began to actively resist the regime. Anarchism and trade unionism soon experienced a revival in La Paz, and urban workers began looking to form alliances with the rural peasantry. By May 1936, anarcho-syndicalists had reorganized the FOL. Its main leading figure in this period was Modesto Escobar, as Luis Cusicanqui had become disillusioned with the FOL and left.

Women, who had taken a larger role in the workforce during the war, helped to accelerate the unionization process. The FOF was reorganized, growing to count 60 unions at its peak. In 1935, the La Paz municipal government had prohibited cooks from using streetcars, following complaints from middle class women. The prohibition was rescinded following mass demonstrations by cooks at City Hall, and a subsequent attempt to raise fares was likewise cancelled after further demonstrations by cooks. In the wake of these demonstrations, the FOF established the Cooks' Union (Spanish: Unión Sindical de Culinarias; USC), which was led by Petronila Infantes. The union demanded the eight-hour day for domestic workers, the establishment of a public child care system, freedom of speech, and equal pay for equal work.

Following a flash flood that destroyed the markets of La Paz, flower vendors began organizing themselves to establish new municipal markets, culminating in the establishment of the Flower Vendors' Union (Spanish: Unión Feminina de Floristas; UFF) in 1936. Municipal markets began to be opened by 1938, but they were too small to fit the number of vendors, and police began cracking down on vendors selling outside of official marketplaces. The FOF responded by holding a "proletarian parliament", where in various languages, they called for women to "conquer the street". The FOF threatened a general strike in response to the police crackdown and demanded the recognition of street vendors' rights, forcing the mayor of La Paz to resign. FOF threats to sue police who harassed street vendors also briefly put an end to the crackdown. As conflicts continued over the subsequent years, the FOF food vendors' union proclaimed Bolivia to be a "country of cholas" and claimed that the men who had died in the Chaco war had sacrificed themselves so mestizos and indigenous people could continue fighting against colonialism in Bolivia.

=== Military socialism ===
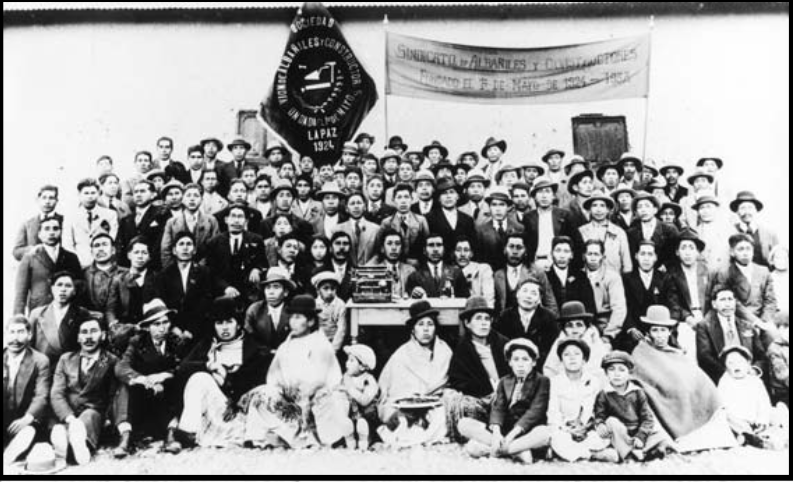
The Bricklayers' and Construction Workers' Union of the FOL (1937)

On 10 May 1936, printing workers in La Paz held the country's first general strike, which was quickly joined by the FOT and FOL. On 17 May, the general strike culminated with a coup d'état, during which the socialist David Toro ousted the government of José Luis Tejada Sorzano. Both the FOL and the FOT claimed sole responsibility for the success of the revolution. Toro appointed the FOT leader Waldó Álvarez as minister of labor, a position from which he decreed wage increases, the compulsory unionization of all workers and the integration of trade unions into the new socialist state. The FOL and FOT subsequently signed an accord, under which they agreed to establish a single national trade union federation. On 29 November 1936, trade unions from throughout the country came together to form the Trade Union Confederation of Bolivian Workers (CSTB). But when the organization's founding congress resolved to endorse the Toro government, the FOL ultimately opted not to join it. After Toro was replaced by Germán Busch, the CSTB again threw its support behind the government.

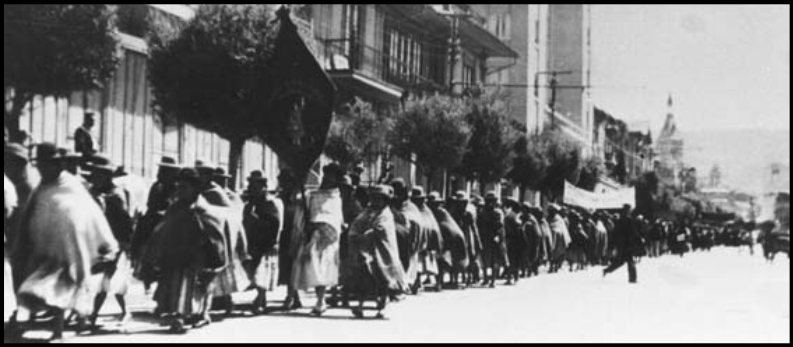
Demonstration by the FOL in 1936

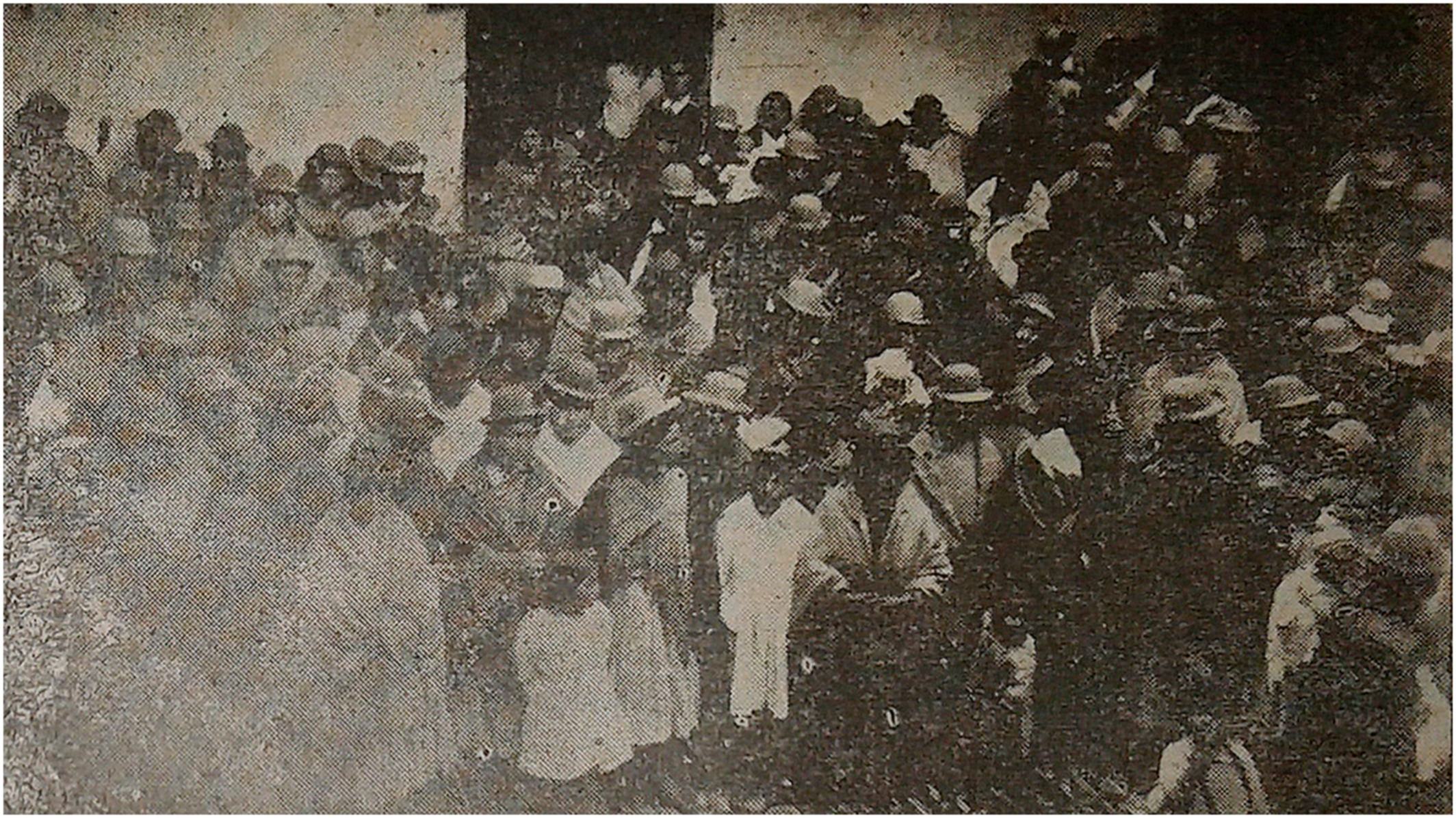
Women of the FOF demonstrating outside a newspaper office in 1941

The FOL quickly came into conflict with the nascent CSTB and supporters of the radical military government, as the two factions competed for influence among factory workers. In October 1937, the second conference of the CSTB ordered the FOL to dissolve itself and merge into the CSTB, but the FOL ignored the declaration. In March 1938, the FOL declared its opposition to the newly-formed Socialist Single Front and affirmed that it would not support any candidates in the 1938 Bolivian legislative election; the FOF likewise opposed calls for women's suffrage, which it considered to be an instrument of class oppression by upper-class white Bolivians. At an International Workers' Day rally that year, a FOF activist gave a speech in the Aymara language calling for the abolition of forced labor practices in the rural haciendas. Meanwhile, the government itself outlawed any collaboration between urban unions and indigenous peasants. In March 1942, the FOL denounced the CSTB for collaborating with the government, saying they were "giving the people a drug to put them to sleep, socialism of the sword, a so-called socialism, made in Germany." In 1943, the FOF led a protest against the mayor of La Paz, demanding price controls on basic necessities and the punishment of police brutality.

== The Sexenio ==
=== 1946 Revolution ===
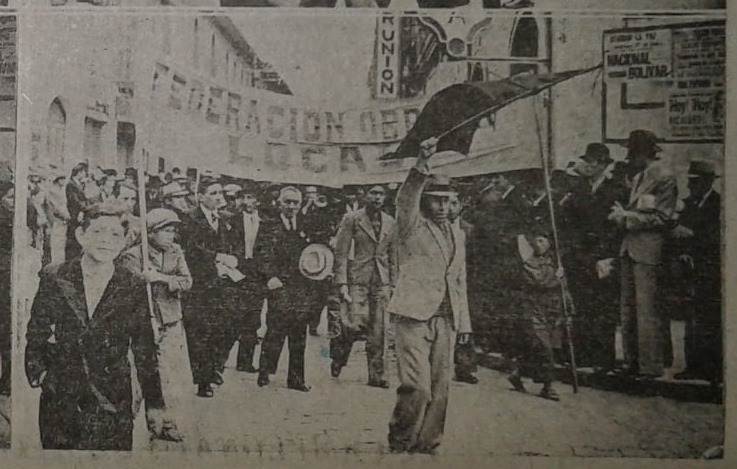
International Workers' Day demonstration by the FOL in 1941

The FOL had been the only trade union federation that opposed the government of Gualberto Villarroel from the outset, as it opposed all governments due to its anarcho-syndicalist principles. However, it had also benefited from the government's relaxation of prior authoritarian restrictions and its tolerance of peasant struggles against rural landlords. In 1946, the FOL took a leading role in the La Paz riots against the government. The FOL denounced the Villarroel regime, which it characterised as a fascist dictatorship, for having stripped people of their human rights and subjected them to a "social economy of hunger and slavery". The riots ultimately brought down the Villarroel government and gave way to the beginning of the Sexenio period, in what the FOL described as a "libertarian revolution" that had reestablished popular sovereignty. It took advantage of the subsequent power vacuum to once again build its strength. It opposed the newly-elected government of Enrique Hertzog, which it considered to be representative of the same ruling class attempting to "rehabilitate itself" through liberal democracy, and called on workers to defend the revolution by strengthening the trade unions. The FOL's manifestoes from this period were likely written by the typographer Líber Forti.

The FOL remained a major force in the La Paz labor movement during the Sexenio period, although it would have to compete with the CSTB, which had fallen under the control of the Revolutionary Left Party. In May 1947, the FOL was estimated to have had 50,000 members and 70 affiliated unions. The FOL itself claimed to have a larger membership than the CSTB, counting some 34,250 members organized into various trade union federations, including in the agricultural, manufacturing and service sectors. However, according to Aurelio Alcoba, the FOL counted only 2,000 members at this time, while the CSTB counted an estimated 60,000 members. At this time, the construction workers' union suffered a split after its leader Pedro Agustin Mostajo attempted to affiliate the union with the CSTB; the anarcho-syndicalist rank-and-file expelled Mostajo and the union soon rejoined the FOL.

=== 1947 Rebellion ===
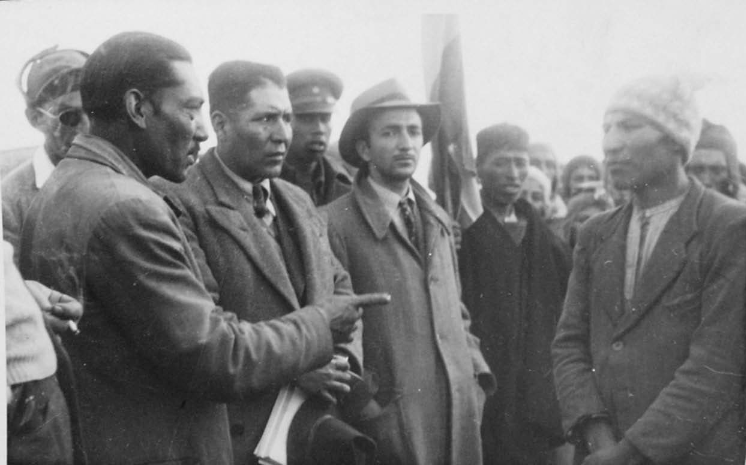
Modesto Escober (left) speaking with an indigenous representative from rural La Paz Department

The largest and most powerful section of the FOL was its Departmental Agrarian Federation (Spanish: Federación Agraria Departamental; FAD), which counted 20,000 members, most of whom were indigenous peasants from the Altiplano region. It was the country's first significant union federation formed by indigenous agricultural workers in Bolivia. The FOL had been reaching out to hacienda workers since mid-1946, seeking to build solidarity between indigenous workers in both the rural and urban areas of La Paz Department. The decision to prioritize rural organizing had been motivated in part by political repression from the government, as well as competition from other left-wing organizations, which had left them isolated in the city and drove them towards building a coalition with the peasantry. Rural activists themselves led the unionization process, with the urban FOL activists playing a supporting role. Rural Aymara people were initially distrustful of the urban FOL workers, due to their experiences with discrimination in the city. But multilingual migrant workers, who largely worked in unskilled trades such as baking, construction and warehousing, acted as goodwill ambassadors to help build confidence between the two. Modesto Escobar, a plumber who himself spoke the Aymara language fluently, was made the FOL's Secretary of Agrarian Relations and toured rural haciendas to promote the formation of unions. Rural organizers themselves regularly attended meetings of the FOL in La Paz city. Marcelino Llanque, a rebel cacique from Ingavi, and the brothers Ernesto and Marcelino Quispe, likewise served as rural representatives to the urban FOL and took its organizing principles back to the countryside with them. In contrast to the urban unions of the FOL, where women held prominent leading roles, almost all of the formal leadership posts in the rural unions were occupied by men, as they were more likely than rural women to speak the Spanish language. Women also played little role in brokering alliances between urban and rural workers.

The government attempted to deter urban workers from going to the countryside, but coalitions between urban and rural workers continued to form, and rural agitation increased. From August to November 1946, the FOL formed its first agricultural workers' unions, which organized against forced labor practices on haciendas in the provinces of Ingavi, Loayza, Los Andes and Pacajes. At least 29 unions were formed during this period. These unions came together to form the FAD in December 1946. With support from teachers, migrant workers and rebel caciques, the FAD organized farm workers' unions and held strike actions. It also established several schools in underserved rural regions, from which it taught many peasant children how to read and agitated for land reform. FAD leader Esteban Quispe complained of low levels of literacy and education among indigenous people, which he blamed on the state. The FAD's newspaper, La Voz del Campo, was often published without crediting individual authors, instead identifying members of the federation simply as "we Indians" in order to assert its indigenous collective identity. The FOL also built ties with indigenous community leaders and hacienda workers in Oruro Department, and helped elect them to mayoral positions in the local school districts. Taking advantage of the new open political climate under the 1947 constitution, the FOL demanded official recognition for its farmworkers' unions and schools, appealing to socialist republican guarantees of workers' rights. Unlike the Marxist and left-wing nationalist parties of the period, which still upheld authoritarian and ethnocentrist viewpoints, the anarchists were relatively successful in organizing rural workers. Bolivian labor leader Guillermo Lora credited the anarchists of the FAD with having "written one of the most brilliant pages of the peasant rebellion".

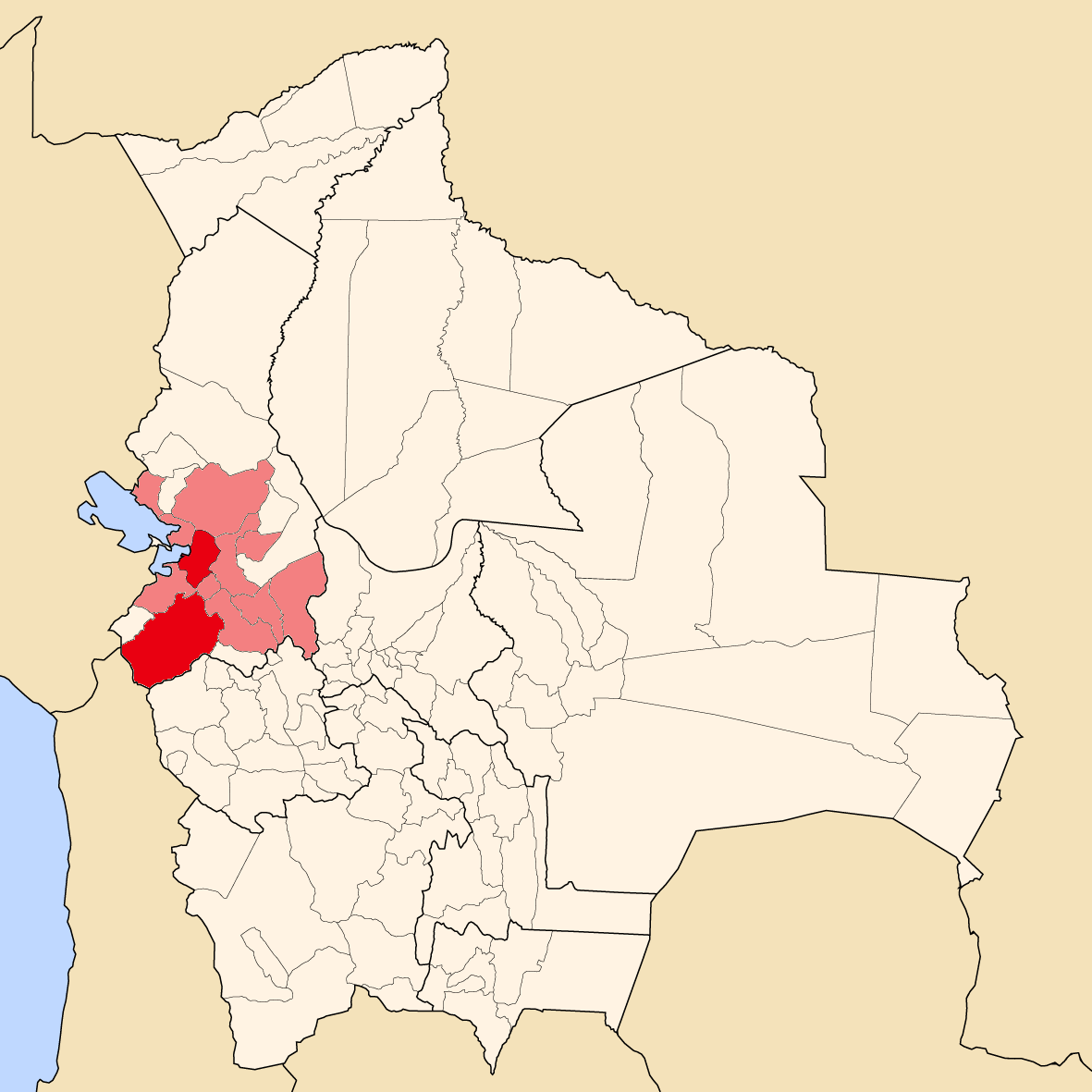
Map of the Indigenous rebellion of 1947, showing the provinces of Los Andes and Pacajes (red), the two major sites of the uprising

Conflict between rural workers and landlords had been building since 1944, with indigenous workers regularly holding illegal assemblies and increasingly carrying out attacks against white landowners in La Paz Department. The situation came to a head following the 1945 Indigenous Congress, which the government had intended to use to coopt the rural workers' movement, but which had instead resulted in a surge of peasant resistance against landlords and state officials. Peasant unions formed during this time made demands for workers' rights, land reform and even the self-determination of Bolivia's indigenous peoples. Between December 1946 and January 1947, rural workers carried out a series of sitdown strikes and land occupations in the haciendas of La Paz Department, with support from the urban workers of the FOL. The burgeoning alliance between urban and rural workers greatly concerned large landowners and state authorities, who worried it could undermine social order. The rising revolutionary nationalist movement condemned the indigenous insurrection, which it believed ran counter to its attempts to build a democratic and hierarchical nation state. Landowners and white residents began to characterise the indigenous rebellions as a "race war" against civilization, and accused members of the FOL of perpetrating violence, which the FOL denied. Between February and April 1947, a wave of union drives and strike actions in La Paz Department escalated into a generalized rebellion, with rural workers seizing land and goods from their landlords. An uprising in the hacienda of Ayopaya was led by a pollera woman, Lorenza Choque. The FAD circulated a manifesto, which denounced the abuses of rural workers by landlords and discrimination against indigenous people by the Bolivian authorities. The FAD manifesto demanded the recognition of rural workers' civil rights and freedom of association under the constitution, the abolition of forced labor practices and a halt to evictions, the establishment of rural schools on every estate, and the convocation of a National Peasants' Congress. While emphasising constitutional guarantees and labor laws, which were regularly invoked by insurgent workers in La Paz during this period, the FAD also reaffirmed its libertarian rejection of political party affiliations and refused to credit President Villarroel for passing the laws they cited.

International Workers' Day rally by rural workers of the FAD and FOL in La Paz, in 1947

On International Workers' Day, thousands of anarchist rural and urban workers from the FAD and FOL participated in an "historic" joint demonstration in La Paz; according to Guillermo Lora, it was in this moment that the government "decided to put an end to anarchist activities in the countryside". In May 1947, the unrest escalated into violence. Hacienda workers in Pacajes killed their administrators and workers in Los Andes murdered their landlord; they continued to demand the restoration of indigenous communal land and an end to forced labor practices. The FAD condemned the violence, insisting that organized workers had no need to commit such attacks, but also held landlords and state officials responsible for the escalation. The FAD and FOL compared the hacienda bosses to conquistadors and claimed their property rights were based exclusively on theft from and violence against indigenous people. The Hertzog government responded by cracking down on the rural unions, with the military and police arresting hundreds of indigenous workers on haciendas and deporting them to agricultural colonies in the jungles of Santa Cruz Department. Modesto Escobar led visits to the imprisoned workers and organized a hunger strike in protest against their treatment.

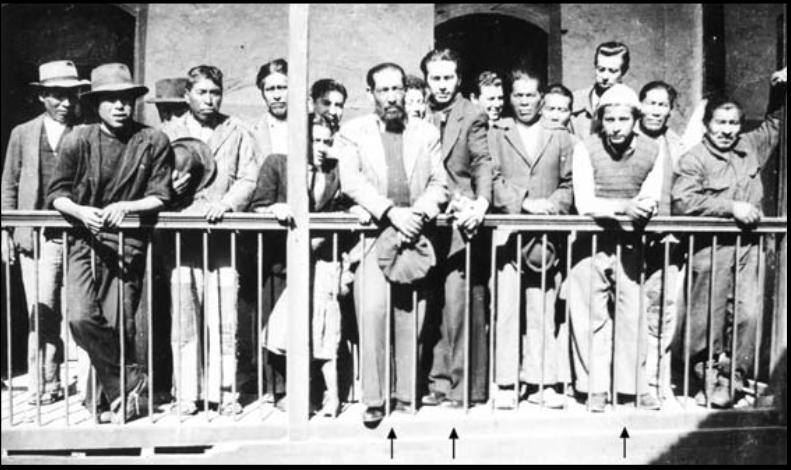
Prisoners of the FOL and FAD, including Modesto Escobar (front and left) and Líber Forti (front and center), following the indigenous rebellions of 1947

The government held the FOL responsible for inciting the unrest, portraying it as the work of outside agitators from urban areas. This despite contemporary first-hand reports of the rebellion never mentioning urban activists. Police raided the headquarters of the FOL, where they arrested 71 union leaders, charged them with sedition and internally exiled to the jungle. Among them were FOL leader Modesto Escobar, and FAD general secretary Marcelino Quispe. 30 of them would die there, either from disease or starvation. The FOL protested the raid, pledging to fight to defend themselves "[to] the last drop of our proletarian blood". The FAD and FOF called a general strike, but it was "only moderately successful" and the conflict ultimately weakened the FOL. By the end of the uprising, more than 1,000 people had been arrested; landlords evicted the detainees and those they suspected of involvement in the uprising; and racist lynch mobs attacked and killed dozens of indigenous people. According to labor historian Kevin A. Young, the violence against indigenous people vastly outweighed that which had been committed against landlords and administrators. The uprising would have a lasting effect on conservative opinion in the country, with the conservative newspaper Los Tiempos worrying that communist agitation among indigenous people would lead to the creation of an indigenous republic in Bolivia.

=== Dissolution ===
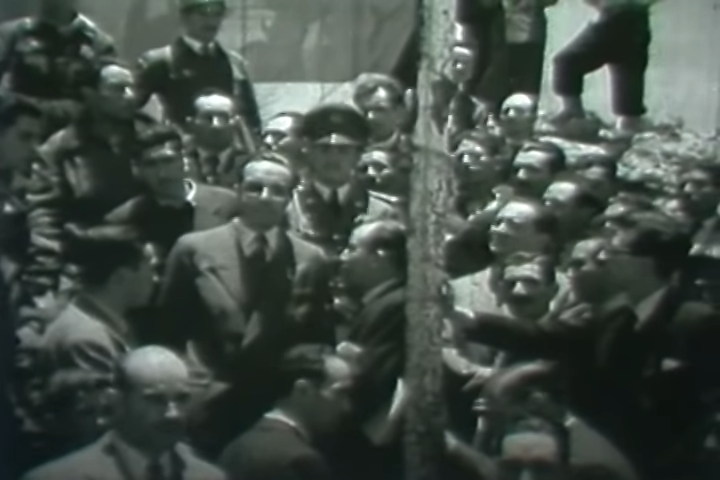
Víctor Paz Estenssoro during the Bolivian National Revolution

Since 1947, state repression from the Hertzog government had caused the FOL to go into a decline. Throughout the Sexenio, anarchists lost influence over the labor movement to the revolutionary nationalists. In 1948, the government released some members of the FOL and pardoned suspected members of the 1947 uprising, but most of the FOL leaders remained in prison and some died. The FOL thereafter lost much of its anarchist character and fell under the control of moderate leftists, while the FAD began to advocate for indigenous assimilation. With the FOL and FAD effectively rendered defunct, revolutionary action against the government was taken up by the Revolutionary Nationalist Movement (MNR). On 9 April 1952, the Bolivian National Revolution began, during which the people of La Paz, including members of the FOL and other local trade unions, rose up and fought to overthrow the military dictatorship. The revolution brought to power the MNR, led by Víctor Paz Estenssoro, who embarked on an ambitious campaign of economic development, land reform and the nationalization of the mining industry. The MNR took a paternalistic attitude towards the country's indigenous communities, which according to Kevin Young, "lacked the humility of the FOL".

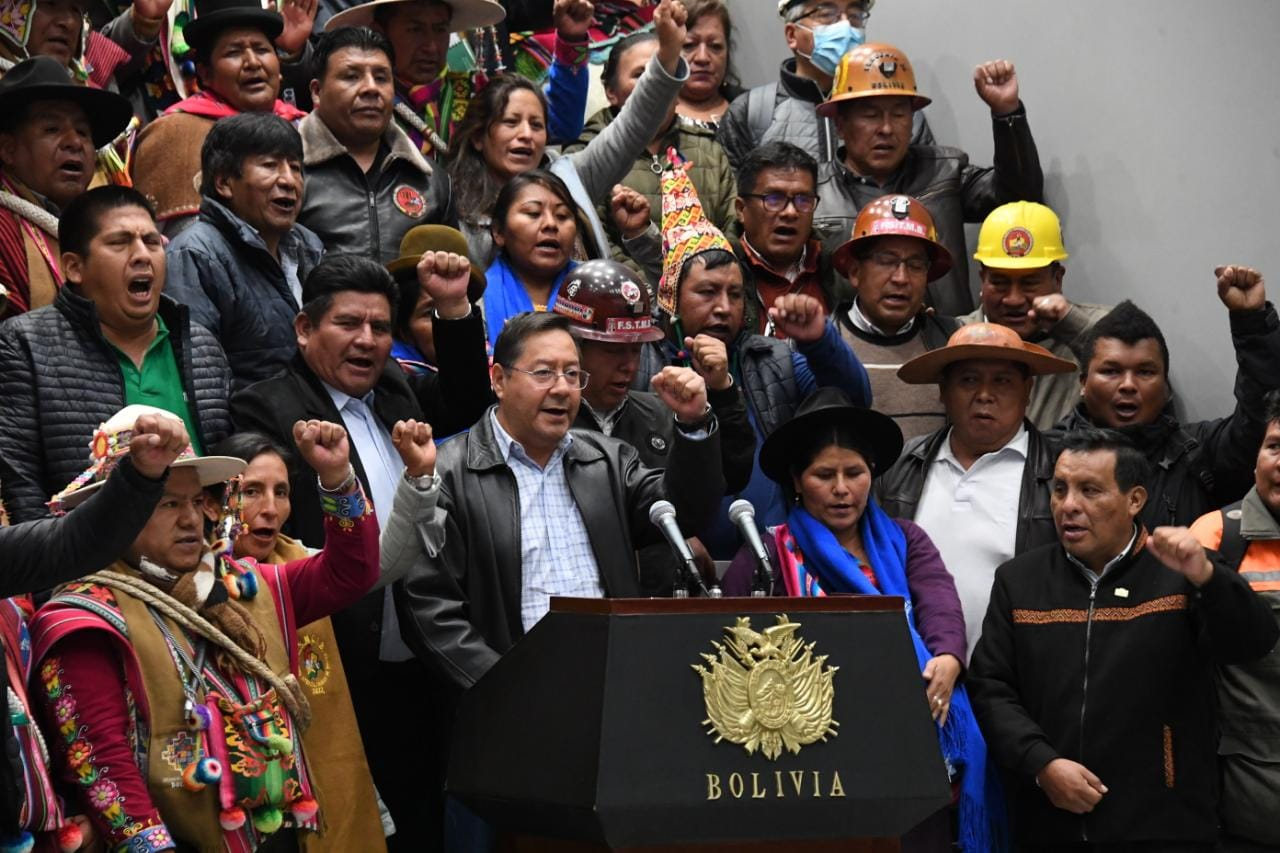
Members of the Bolivian Workers' Center (COB) in 2023

The FOL's operations briefly revived, with the organization reopening its headquarters for the first time in 5 years. But the anarchists' opposition to party politics marginalized them in this new political climate and they increasingly lost influence to the nationalists. On 17 April 1952, a new national trade union federation, the Bolivian Workers' Center (COB), was established by the MNR minister Juan Lechín. The FOL's agricultural workers', construction workers' and tailors' unions all merged into the nascent COB, leaving behind only the FOF, which remained under anarcho-syndicalist leadership. The FOL was soon reduced to a handful of craft unions and eventually disappeared. By 1953, the FOF had joined the COB. In 1958, the Cooks' Union merged into it as well. The dissolution of the FOL into the COB coincided with the decline of anarcho-syndicalism throughout South America, with the Chilean CGT and FORU likewise merging into larger trade union federations. Syndicalism nevertheless continued to hold an influence in the COB into the 21st century.

== Legacy ==
Bolivian scholars began researching the history of the FOL during the 1980s, uncovering the history of the Bolivian anarchist movement beyond the Chaco War, which had previously been neglected by historiography of the local labor movement, and highlighting intersections between class, gender and race within the movement. In May 1986, Silvia Rivera Cusicanqui held an exhibition about the FOL, displaying photographs and documents from the organization, as well as some of their artifacts. The exhibition received a large public interest, and was attended by several former members of the FOL. The ch'ixi anarcho-syndicalism of the FOL experienced a resurgence at the turn of the 21st century, as activists again began placing emphasis on horizontalism, direct democracy and affinity.

== Bibliography ==
- Alexander, Robert J. (2005). A History of Organized Labor in Bolivia. Parker, Eldon M. Praeger Publishers. ISBN 0-275-97744-7.
- Alexander, Robert J.; Parker, Eldon M. (2009). International Labor Organizations and Organized Labor in Latin America and the Caribbean: A History. ABC-Clio. ISBN 978-0-275-97739-9.
- Ari, Waskar (2014). Earth Politics: Religion, Decolonization, and Bolivia's Indigenous Intellectuals. Duke University Press. ISBN 978-0-8223-5617-2.
- Bjork-James, Carwil (2013). Claiming space, redefining politics: Urban protest and grassroots power in Bolivia (Thesis). City University of New York. ProQuest 3601675.
- Bonner, Christine; Spooner, Dave, eds. (2012). The Only School We Have: Learning from Organizing Experiences Across the Informal Economy (PDF). WIEGO. ISBN 978-92-95095-35-9.
- Damier, Vadim (2009) [2000]. Anarcho-syndicalism in the 20th Century. Translated by Archibald, Malcolm. Edmonton: Black Cat Press. ISBN 978-0-9737827-6-9.
- Gallin, Dan; Horn, Pat (2005). Organizing informal women workers. UNRISD Gender Policy Report.
- Gallin, Dan (2011). Organizing Informal Workers: Historical Overview (PDF). WIEGO Workshop. WIEGO.
- Gotkowitz, Laura (2007). A Revolution for Our Rights: Indigenous Struggles for Land and Justice in Bolivia, 1880-1952. Duke University Press. ISBN 9780822340676.
- Haynes, Nell (2013). Chola in a choke hold: Gender, globalization, and authenticity in Bolivian lucha libre (PDF) (PhD). American University. ProQuest 3560085.
- Hirsch, Steven J. (2010). "Peruvian Anarcho-Syndicalism: adapting transnational influences and forging counterhegemonic practices, 1905–1930". In Hirsch, Steven J.; van der Walt, Lucien (eds.). Anarchism and Syndicalism in the Colonial and Postcolonial World, 1870-1940: The Praxis of National Liberation, Internationalism, and Social Revolution. Brill. ISBN 978-90-04-18849-5.
- Hirsch, Steven J.; van der Walt, Lucien (2010). "Final Reflections: the vicissitudes of anarchist and syndicalist trajectories, 1940 to the present". In Hirsch, Steven J.; van der Walt, Lucien (eds.). Anarchism and Syndicalism in the Colonial and Postcolonial World, 1870-1940: The Praxis of National Liberation, Internationalism, and Social Revolution. Brill. pp. 395–412. ISBN 978-90-04-18849-5.
- Jetmarová, Jana (2022). "‟We are Indians, Whores and Lesbians, Revolted and Twined Together." Decolonial Feminism in Bolivia" (PDF). Ethnologia Actualis. 22 (1): 28–61. doi:10.2478/eas-2022-0010.
- Kim, Young Hyun (2018). Popular Politics of Social Emancipation in Bolivia from the 1930s to the Present: Indigeneity, Revolution and the State (PhD). University of California, San Diego. ProQuest 10973606.
- Lora, Guillermo (2009). A History of the Bolivian Labour Movement 1848-1971. Cambridge University Press. ISBN 9780521100212.
- Margarucci, Ivanna (2020). "Intersections between transnationalism and nationalism in Bolivian anarchism, 1900-1930". Latin American Almanac. 26 (1): 86–108. doi:10.32608/2305-8773-2020-26-1-86-108. ISSN 2305-8773.
- Margarucci, Ivanna (2023). ""A Fatherland worth living in": Anarchism, citizenship and nation in Bolivia, 1900–1941". Nations and Nationalism. 29 (1): 191–208. doi:10.1111/nana.12895.
- Rivera Cusicanqui, Silvia (2020). "Andean Micropolitics: Elementary Forms of Quotidian Insurgency". In Santos, Boaventura; Mendes, José (eds.). Demodiversity: Toward Post-Abyssal Democracies. Routledge. doi:10.4324/9781003052937-6. ISBN 9781003052937.
- Stephenson, Marcia (1999). Gender and Modernity in Andean Bolivia. University of Texas Press. ISBN 0-292-77743-4.
- Tapia, Reynaldo (2019). The evolution of indigenous resistance in Bolivia (PhD). Rutgers University.
- van der Walt, Lucien; Schmidt, Michael (2009). Black Flame: The Revolutionary Class Politics of Anarchism and Syndicalism. Edinburgh: AK Press. ISBN 978-1-904859-16-1. OCLC 1100238201.
- van der Walt, Lucien (2018). "Syndicalism". In Adams, Matthew S.; Levy, Carl (eds.). The Palgrave Handbook of Anarchism. London: Palgrave Macmillan. pp. 249–264. doi:10.1007/978-3-319-75620-2_14. ISBN 978-3319756196. S2CID 242074567.
- Webber, Jeffrey R. (2011). Red October: Left-Indigenous Struggles in Modern Bolivia. Brill. ISBN 978-90-04-20155-2.
- Young, Kevin A. (2016). "The making of an interethnic coalition: urban and rural anarchists in La Paz, Bolivia, 1946–1947". Latin American and Caribbean Ethnic Studies. 11 (2): 163–188. doi:10.1080/17442222.2016.1164944.
- Young, Kevin A. (2017). Blood of the Earth: Resource Nationalism, Revolution, and Empire in Bolivia. University of Texas Press. ISBN 978-1-4773-1165-3.
