= Women Workers' Federation =

The Women Workers' Federation (Spanish: Federación Obrera Femenina; FOF) was an association of anarcho-syndicalist women's unions in Bolivia. It was active from 1927 to 1964.

== History ==
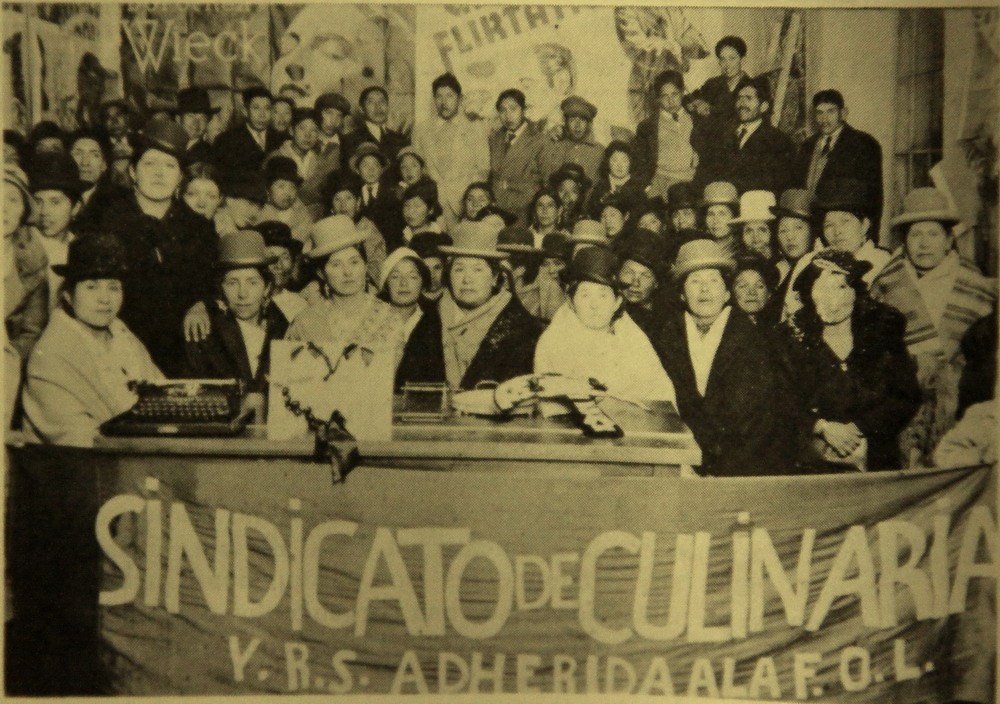
Members of the Cooks' Union, a FOF member organization, in La Paz in 1937

Various anarchist-leaning women's associations and unions decided to join as the Women Workers' Federation (Federación Obrera Femenina, or FOF) in 1927. The FOF was established as a branch of the Local Workers' Federation (FOL). It mainly comprised domestic workers, market workers (such as flower sellers), and cooks.

At its peak, it brought together 60 unions, including the Cooks' Union, the Women Florists' Union, the Camacho Market Various Trades Union, the Pottery Various Trades Union, the Women Meat Workers' Union, the Milk Workers' Union, and the Lanza Market Annex Union.

Notable members of FOF included Nicolasa Ibáñez, Catalina Mendoza, Tomasita Patón, and Petronila Infantes.

After a disruption during the Chaco War, the FOF returned in 1940. It had lost prominence beginning in the 1930s as women workers shifted to joining non-gendered unions, and anarchist-leaning members of the women's movement remained marginalized. However, the FOF did not cease its activities until 1964, outlasting the FOL, which dissolved in the mid-1950s.

== Causes ==
In addition to promoting a platform of labor demands, the FOF demanded the right to absolute divorce, the creation of child care centers, and equality before the law.

Its main adversaries were municipal governments and the powerful older market directors. An important portion of its members were pollera women, who tied their fight for improved working conditions to issues of class and racism.
