= Bolivia–Mexico relations =

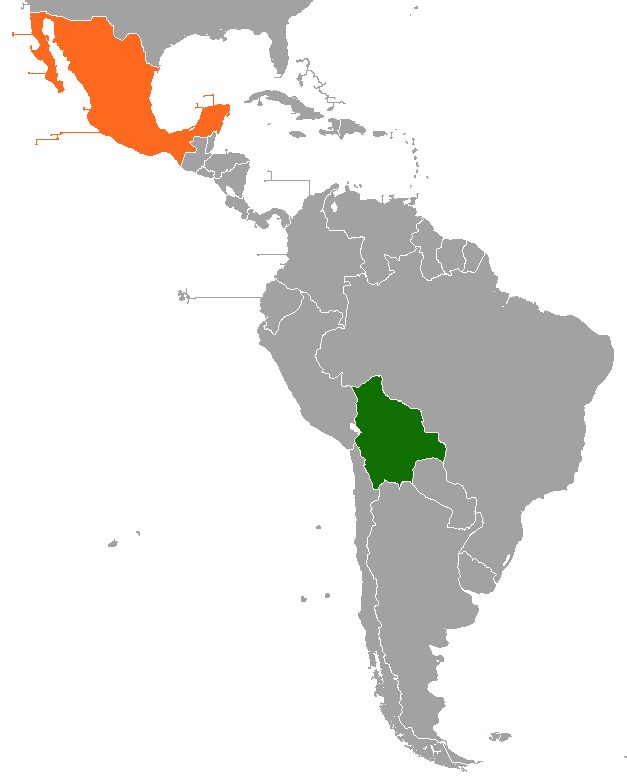

- Bolivia: Mexico

The nations of Bolivia and Mexico established diplomatic relations in 1831. Both nations are members of the Community of Latin American and Caribbean States, Latin American Integration Association, Organization of American States, Organization of Ibero-American States and the United Nations.

There is a community of approximately 10,000 Mexican citizens residing in Bolivia, many primarily from the Mennonite community.

== History ==
Historically, both nations were host to great indigenous cultures; the Aztecs and Mayas in Mexico and the Incas and Aymaras in Bolivia. Both countries were part of the Spanish Empire until the early 19th century. Mexico was part of Viceroyalty of New Spain while Bolivia was at first part of the Viceroyalty of Peru and then in 1776, it became part of the Viceroyalty of the Río de la Plata.

Soon after independence, both nations established diplomatic relations in 1831. That same year, Mexico sent its first concurrent ambassador to Bolivia based in Buenos Aires, Argentina. In September 1902, the first Mexican consulate-general was opened in La Paz and thus the first official diplomatic mission of Mexico in the country. In 1934, Bolivia opened its first diplomatic mission in Mexico City. In February 1939, both diplomatic missions were elevated to embassies in each other's capitals, respectively.

Between 1964 and 1982, Bolivia was ruled by a military junta. During this time period, diplomatic relations between Bolivia and Mexico became tense. Between 1967 and 1980, the Mexican embassy in La Paz provided asylum to 260 Bolivian citizens during that time period. The most prominent asylee at the embassy was Dr. Antonio Arguedas Mendieta, a Bolivian national and former Minister of the Interior who in 1968 arranged for copies of Che Guevara's captured diaries to be smuggled to Havana, Cuba after his death in Bolivia in October 1967. When the government of President René Barrientos discovered the documents to be missing, it was discovered that Dr. Arguedas Mendieta was a CIA agent who had been recruited to destroy Che Guevara's forces in the country, but he was soon to become disenchanted with the Bolivian government and decided to send Guevara's diaries to Cuba. Dr. Arguedas Mendieta was accused by the Bolivian State for selling state secrets and in July 1969, Dr. Arguedas Mendieta sought asylum in the Mexican embassy where he remained until May 1970 when he was granted safe-conduct out of Bolivia to Mexico.

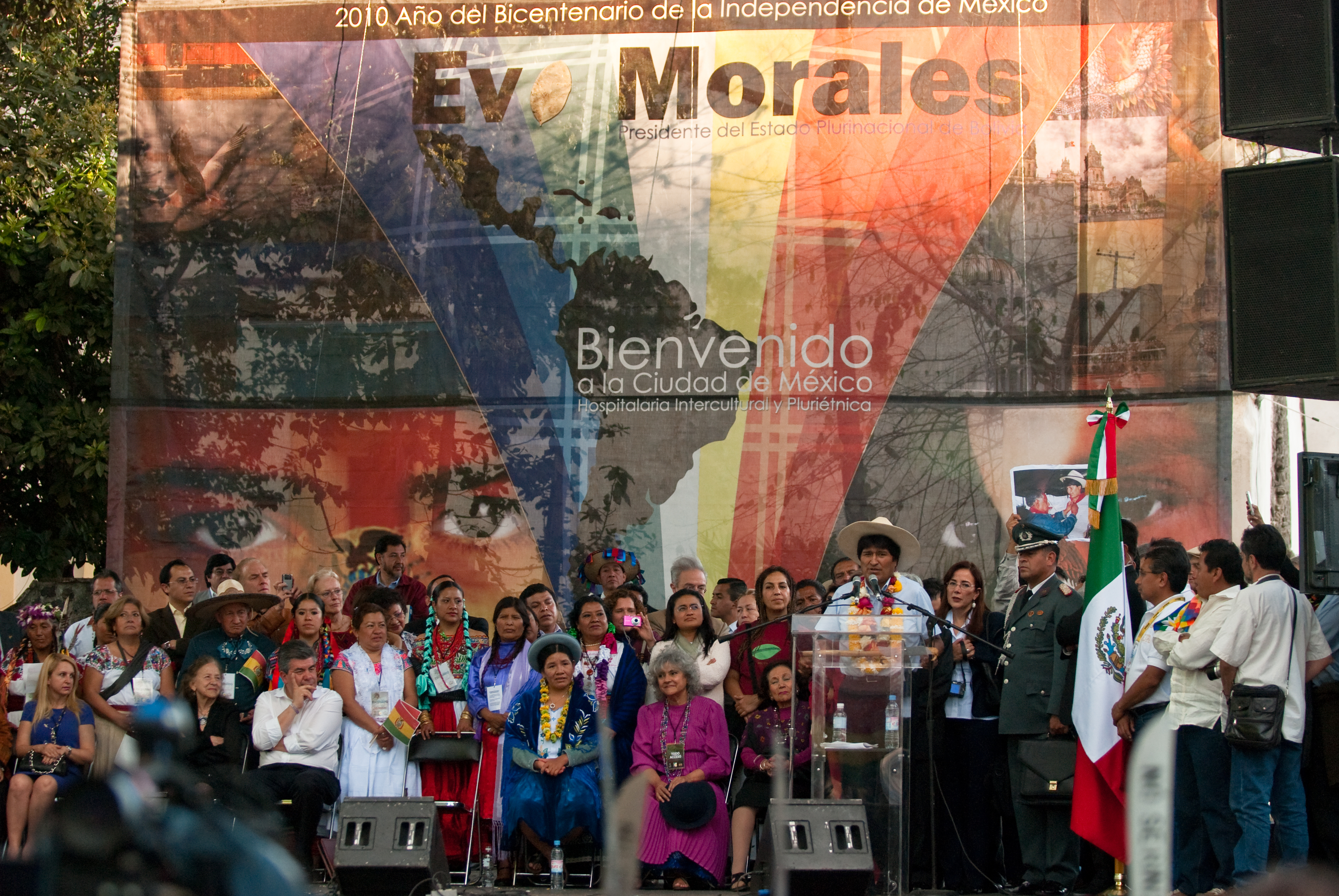
Bolivian President Evo Morales in Mexico City; 2010.

In 1960, Mexican President Adolfo López Mateos had planned to visit Bolivia, however, his visit was suspended by force majeure. In 1963, President Víctor Paz Estenssoro became the first Bolivian head-of-state to visit Mexico. In 1990, President Carlos Salinas de Gortari became the first Mexican head-of-state to pay an official visit to Bolivia.

In September 1994, Bolivia and Mexico signed a free trade agreement, however, in June 2010, Bolivian President Evo Morales cancelled the free trade agreement with Mexico. In January 2019, Bolivian Foreign Minister, Diego Pary, paid a visit to Mexico and met with Mexican Foreign Minister Marcelo Ebrard. During the visit, Mexico stated that it intends to remove visa requirements for Bolivian citizens for touristic purposes.

=== 2019 Bolivian political crisis ===
During the 2019 Bolivian general election, the Organization of American States conducted an audit that found "clear manipulation" in the election and significant irregularities overseen by the Electoral Commission. Following protests, President Morales agreed to hold fresh elections on 10 November 2019; however, soon afterwards President Morales and his vice president, Álvaro García Linera, resigned from office after losing support from the police and military. The Mexican government offered President Morales asylum in Mexico which he accepted the following day before boarding a Mexican Air Force plane to Mexico and arrived in Mexico City on 12 November 2019. On 12 December 2019, Evo Morales left Mexico for Argentina after the swearing in of the new president, Alberto Fernández, where he was granted asylum.

Upon the arrival of Evo Morales to Mexico, relations between Mexico and the Bolivian government of interim-President Jeanine Áñez had been tense. The Mexican embassy in La Paz had opened its ambassador's residence to various former associates of Evo Morales, and this had led to protests from angry Bolivians who oppose the ex-president. The Mexican government had accused Bolivian authorities of harassing and intimidating its diplomatic staff, and had asked the International Court of Justice to mediate in the dispute. On 30 December, a few days after two Spanish diplomats visited the Mexican embassy's residence to pay a courtesy visit; the Bolivian government expelled the Mexican Ambassador, María Teresa Mercado, from the country along with two Spanish diplomats and accused both governments of having ulterior "hostile" motives, thus creating a diplomatic dispute between the Bolivian government with both Mexico and Spain.

=== Post political crisis ===
After electoral victory of Luis Arce in 2020 Bolivian general election the relations between Bolivia and Mexico became friendly again. Luis Arce visited Mexico as President of Bolivia in March 2021 and met with his Mexican counterpart Andrés Manuel López Obrador. In May 2021, Mexico eliminated visa requirements for ordinary Bolivian passport holders to visit Mexico. In September of that same year, President Acre returned to Mexico to attend the CELAC summit.

== High-level visits ==
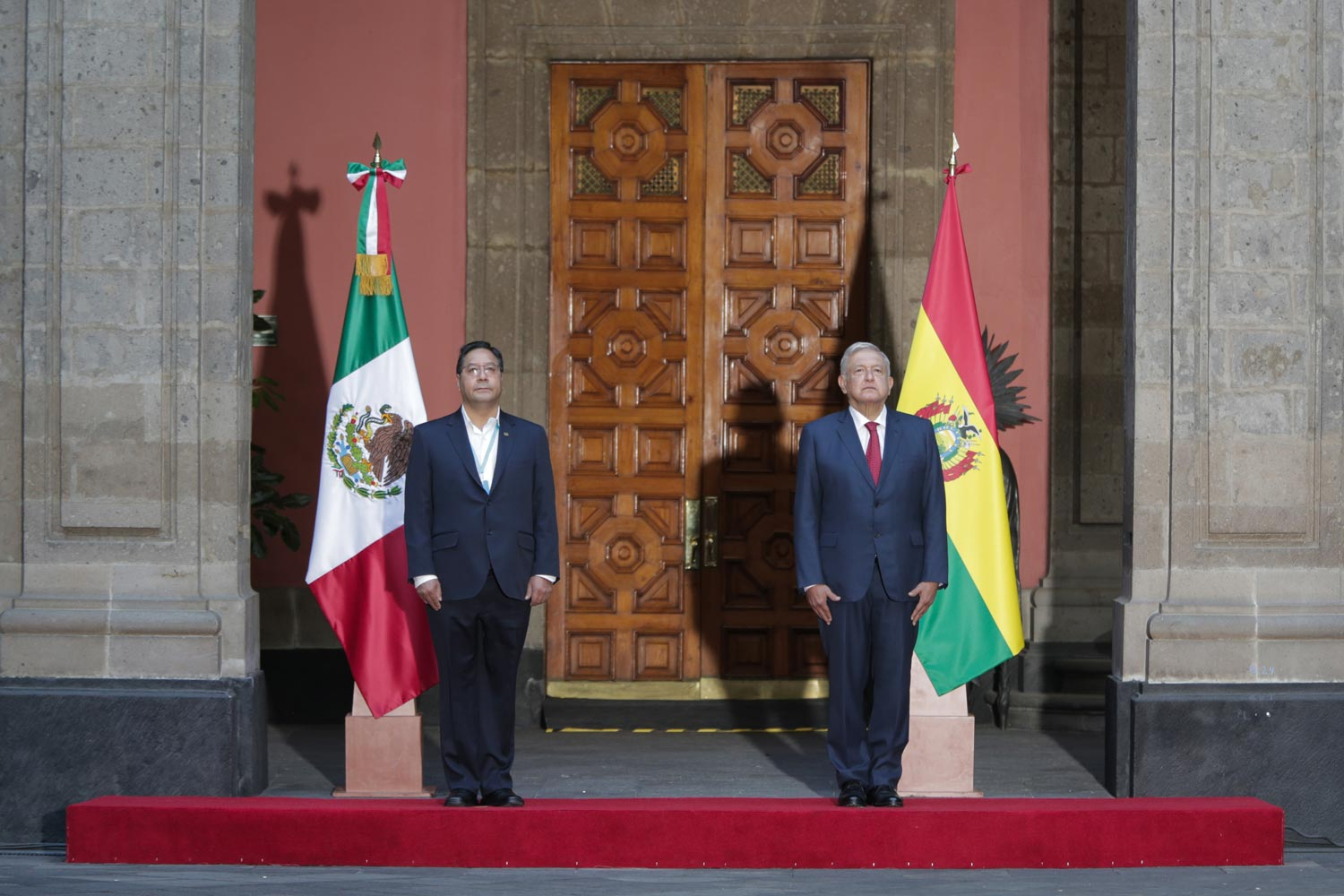
Mexican President Andrés Manuel López Obrador with Bolivian President Luis Arce in Mexico City; March 2021.

Presidential visits from Bolivia to Mexico

- President Víctor Paz Estenssoro (1963)
- President Jaime Paz Zamora (1990)
- President Hugo Banzer Suárez (1998)
- President Jorge Quiroga (2002)
- President Evo Morales (2010, 2018)
- President Luis Arce (March & September 2021)

Presidential visits from Mexico to Bolivia

- President Carlos Salinas de Gortari (1990)
- President Ernesto Zedillo (1996)
- President Vicente Fox (2003, 2005)

== Bilateral agreements ==
Both nations have signed several bilateral agreements such as a Treaty for the Execution of Criminal Sentences (1985); Agreement on Technical and Scientific Cooperation (1990); Agreement of Cooperation to Combat Drug Trafficking and Drug dependency (1990); Air Transportation Agreement (1993); Agreement in Education, Sports and Cultural Cooperation (1998); Treaty of Cooperation of Legal Aid in Criminal Matters (2005); Extradition Treaty (2007) and an Agreement of Cooperation in Mutual Administrative Assistance and Exchange of Information in Customs Matters (2015).

== Trade ==
In September 1994, a free trade agreement was signed between the two nations, however, in June 2010 Bolivian President Evo Morales cancelled the free trade agreement with Mexico. In 2023, bilateral trade between Bolivia and Mexico amounted to US$276 million. Bolivia's exports to Mexico include: tin ingots, soybeans, oil seeds, helmets, hides and skins, zinc ores and concentrates. Mexico's exports to Bolivia include: motor vehicles and tractors, medicines, household appliances, machinery, malt extracts and petroleum. Mexican multinational companies such as Gruma and Grupo Bimbo operate in Bolivia.

== Resident diplomatic missions ==
- Bolivia has an embassy in Mexico City.
- Mexico has an embassy in La Paz.

Embassy of Bolivia in Mexico City

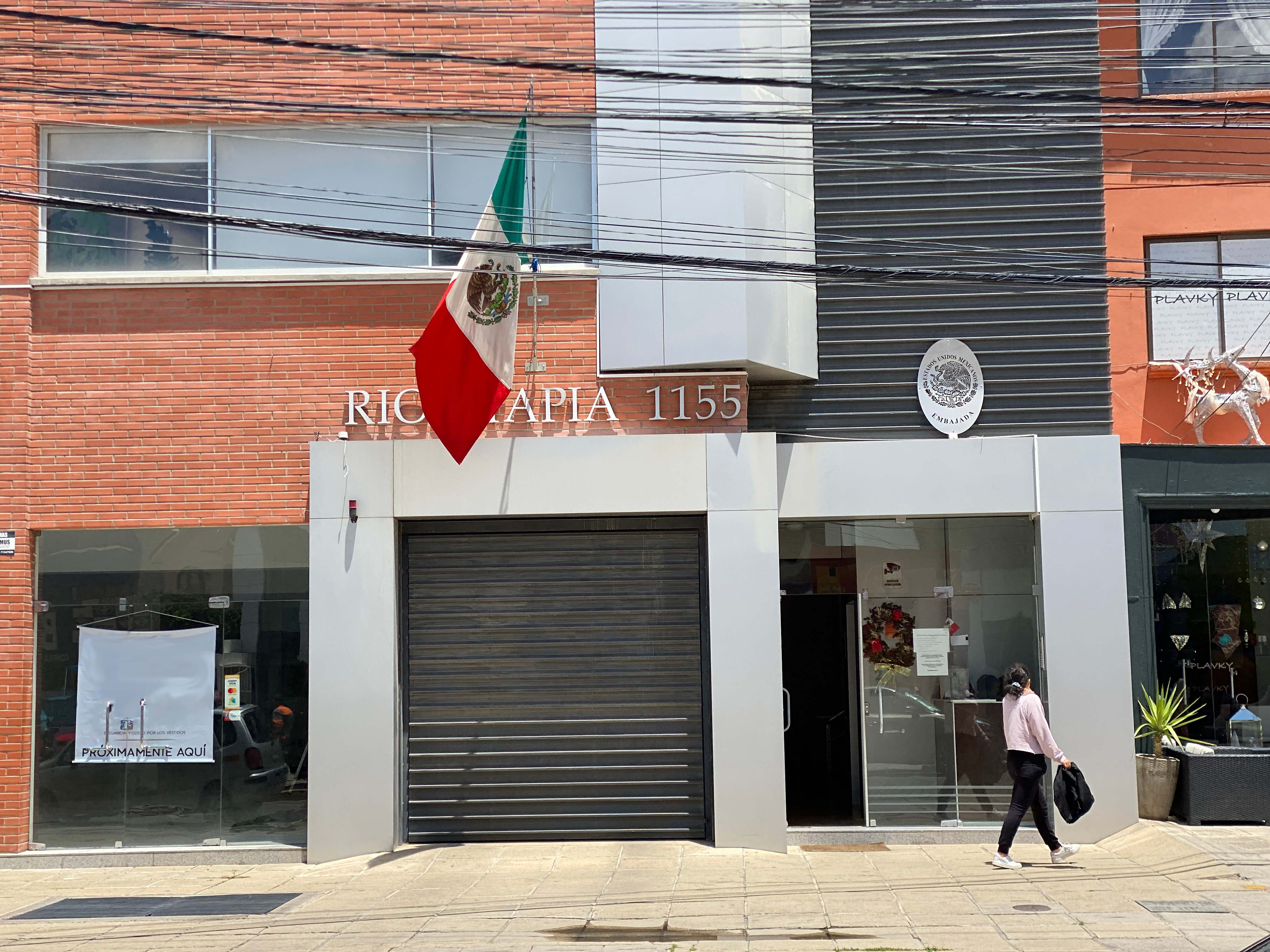
Embassy of Mexico in La Paz

== Gallery ==
Statue of Antonio José de Sucre in Mexico City

Stamps from Bolivia commemorating the 1968 Summer Olympics in Mexico City

Elementary school "México" in La Paz, Bolivia
