= La Humanidad =

Bolivian anarcho-syndicalist newspaper

- Type: Weekly
- Founded: 1928
- Ceased publication: 1928
- Political alignment: Anarcho-Syndicalist
- Language: Spanish language
- Headquarters: La Paz

La Humanidad ('The Humanity') was a weekly anarcho-syndicalist newspaper published from La Paz, Bolivia. La Humanidad was founded in 1928 as the organ of the Local Workers' Federation (FOL). FOL had emerged from a split from the Marxist-oriented Federación Obrera del Trabajo. Directors of the newspaper included Guillermo Pelaez, G. Maceda, D. Osuna and Luis Salvatierra. The newspaper opposed involvement of the labour movement in electoral politics. After just seven issues, the newspaper found itself indebted and unprofitable.
