= Petronila Infantes =

Bolivian anarchist and trade unionist

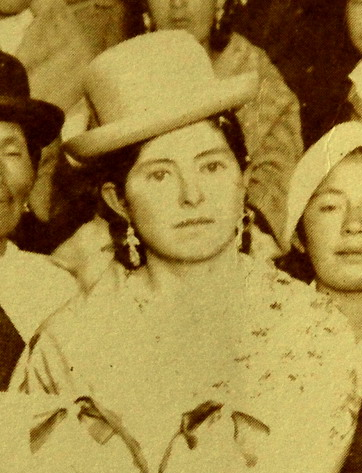
- Born: 29 July 1911; La Paz, Bolivia
- Died: 10 May 1991 (aged 79); La Paz, Bolivia
- Other name: Dona Peta
- Citizenship: Bolivian
- Occupations: Cook and trade unionist
- Movement: Culinary Workers Union; Women Workers' Federation

Petronila Infantes (29 June 1911 – 8 October 1991) was a Bolivian anarchist and trade unionist. She was the founder of the Culinary Workers Union, and a leader in the women's anarchist movement in Bolivia.

== Biography ==
Infantes was born in La Paz on 29 June 1911. At a very young age she went to live in Eucaliptus. She worked with her father for an American company there, but he died when she was very young. Soon after she started working as a street vendor, then later as a cook, trained by her mother. During her first marriage she had a son, José Enrique, and a daughter, Alicia. Her wedding was a civil, rather than a religious ceremony, as she was suspicious of where and how the church's wealth was distributed.

== Activism ==
“Women organize like this: We defend ourselves, we manage ourselves."

— Petronila Infantes

One of the anti-discrimination protests that Infantes was involved in revolved around a ban in 1935 on the tram system for people with heavy luggage or clothing that might come in contact with others. This ban was introduced after upper-class women complained that their stockings were being torn by the pollera skirts of lower-class chola women. These women were indigenous and mestiza women, who wore traditional pollera skirts and bowler hats. Many of the women affected were cholas and many worked as cooks, they were tired of being discriminated against and formed the all-female Culinary Workers Union as a response to the discriminatory practices of the tram companies. Infantes was one of its founding members. The tram companies had to overturn the ban, due to public pressure. However politics was not free of discrimination and Infantes recalled how at a conference in 1929, Bolivian upper-class women who were present objected to cholas giving a presentation.

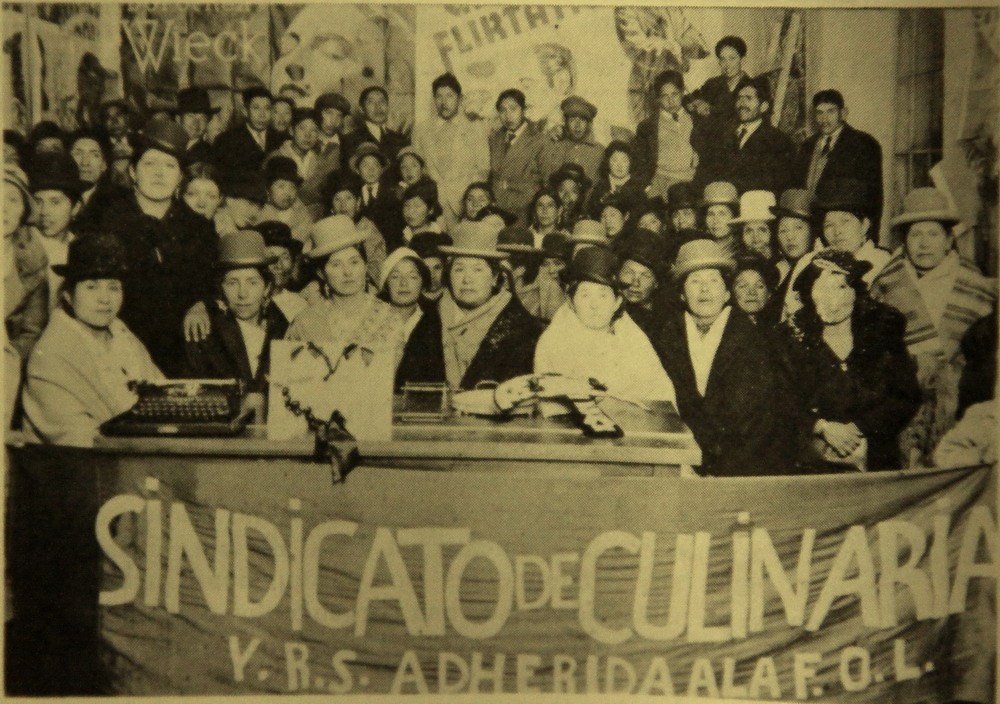
Culinary Workers Union

The work of the Culinary Workers Union led to the recognition of cook as a profession, to an eight-hour working day and to the provision of free childcare for working mothers. Its model was adopted by other all-female unions, including the Women's Union of Florists, the Union of Recoveras and the Union of Travellers to the Altiplano. In 1940, all twelve all-female unions incorporated into one. It was Infantes' administrative skills which enabled much of the transformation of all twelve into the Women Workers Federation (FOF) in 1940, and became the FOF's leader. Throughout the 1940s and 1950s, Infantes continued to co-ordinate the work of the FOF. At its peak, the FOF was made up of over sixty unions, with Infantes as a key figure. When Infantes was arrested whilst protesting, her young daughter was placed in the goal cell with her.

== Legacy ==
Many trade unions, such as the National Federation of Domestic Workers of Bolivia, recognise Infantes as one of their pioneers.
