= Pollera women =

Andean women's culture

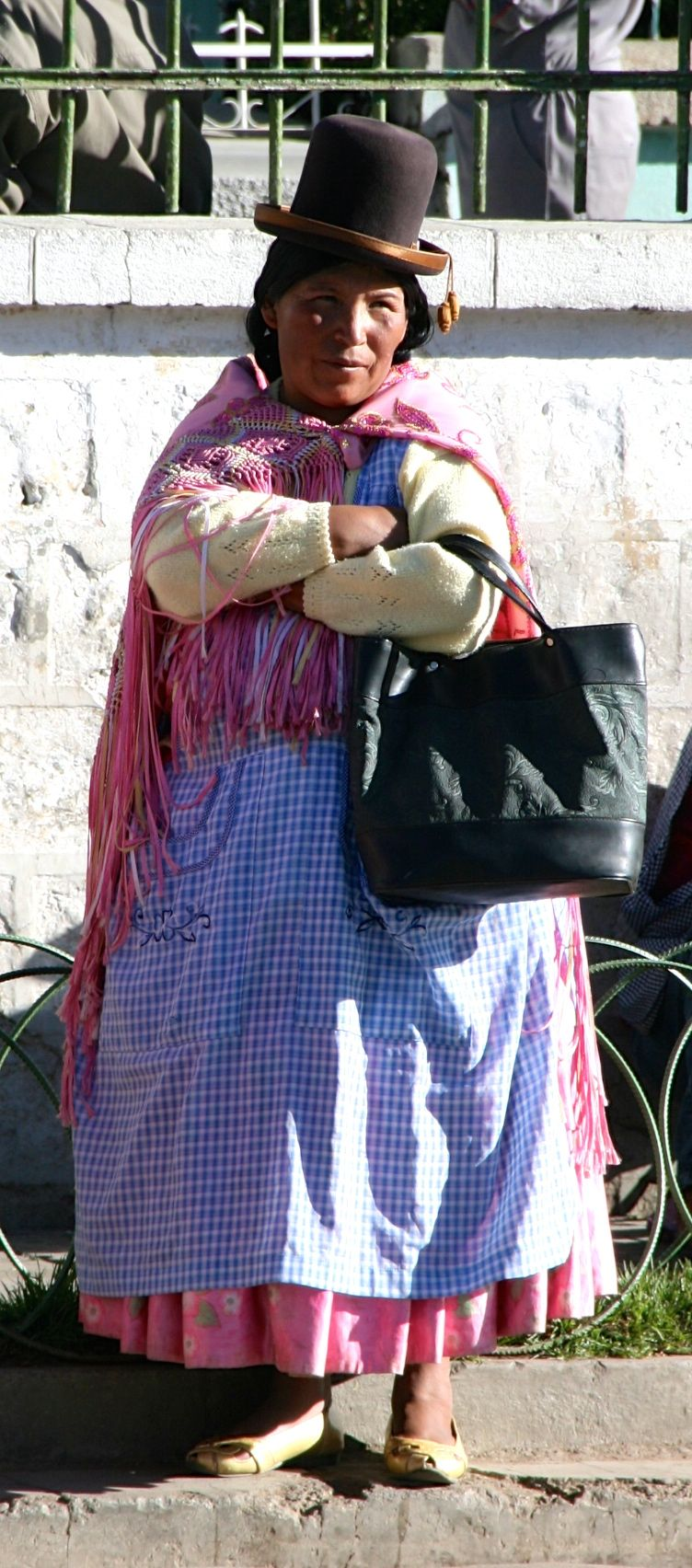
La Paz pollera woman (Chola paceña) in traditional dress

Pollera women (Spanish: mujeres de pollera), also known by the historical pejorative chola (diminutive cholita) are Andean women of a hybrid culture between the dominant mestizo Andean urban culture and the indigenous, rural campesino culture (largely the Quechua or Aymara peoples, but also including Afro-Bolivians). Hailing from a multi-racial background (cholo), pollera women have a distinct traditional dress defined by the eponymous wide pollera skirt with layered petticoats (enagua), two pleated braids, and a shawl, lliklla and/or an aguayo; regional variations include distinctive hats like the bowler hat, jewelry, and tullma braid ornaments.

Historically the terms chola and cholita were racial slurs, and cholas were discriminated against; the term has been reappropriated in some regions, particularly Bolivia, while still carrying a dominantly pejorative sense in other areas, like Peru. Groups championing the pollera woman aesthetic and culture are active in popular music, fashion, adventure sports and sports entertainment.

== Nomenclature ==
The term chola was historically a pejorative for women of the cholo ethnicity or caste. The etymology is disputed, and numerous false etymologies exist. The term Chola saw some reappropriation through the 20th and 21st centuries, particularly in Bolivia; the diminutive cholita was similarly re-appropriated, but can still carry a belittling or adultist sense.

== History ==
The pollera woman identity is predicated upon the mixed-race social class of cholos, introduced after Spanish conquest of the Inca Empire in the 16th century as a racial caste of the casta system. Following the Rebellion of Túpac Amaru II and Túpac Katari of 1780-1783, native customs were strictly banned by the Viceroyalties of Peru and the Río de la Plata. Cholas were mandated to wear Spanish-style clothing, defining their contemporary dress style; those of La Paz, Oruro and Potosí were told to follow the folk dress of Extremadura, whilst in Chuquisaca, Cochabamba and Tarija, they were mandated to dress in Andalusian peasant clothing.

=== Bolivia ===
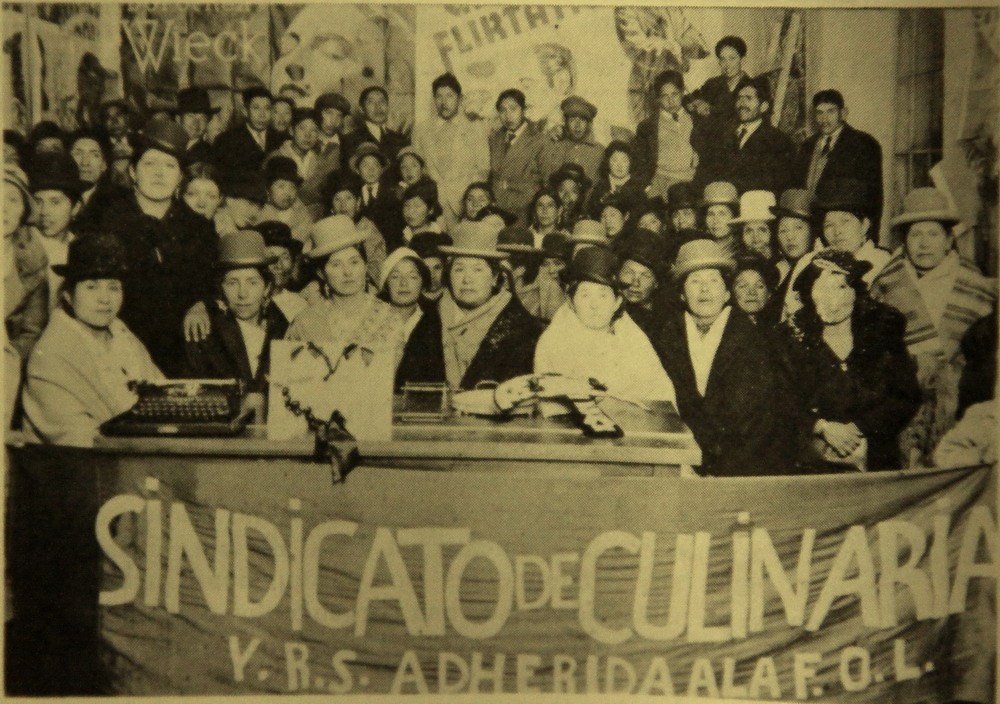
Sindicato de Culinarias, La Paz, 1937

Pollera women were a major constituent of Bolivian trade unions and anarcha-feminism in the early 20th century, participating in organizations like the Sindicato de Culinarias - founded by pollera woman Petronila Infantes - and the Federación Obrera Femenina. Although the Bolivian National Revolution of 1952 brought universal suffrage and land reform, pollera women remained second-class citizens; urbanizing pollera women were subject to social exclusion, being banned from public spaces like the Plaza Murillo and frequently denied service in shops, buses and taxis. By the 1970s, pollera women were largely street vendors and migrant workers.

Following the election of the indigenous president Evo Morales in 2005 and dominance of his Indigenismo party Movimiento al Socialismo thereafter, pollera women achieved significant upward mobility. Discrimination against pollera women was banned under the 2010 Law Against Racism. Pollera women began to enter publicly visible fields like law, government and journalism. In October 2013, the city of La Paz declared the "La Paz chola" (chola paceña) as part of the city's intangible cultural heritage. Yola Mamani, a pollera woman, runs her own YouTube channel focused on feminism and politics, and has also hosted radio shows.

==== Afro-Bolivians ====
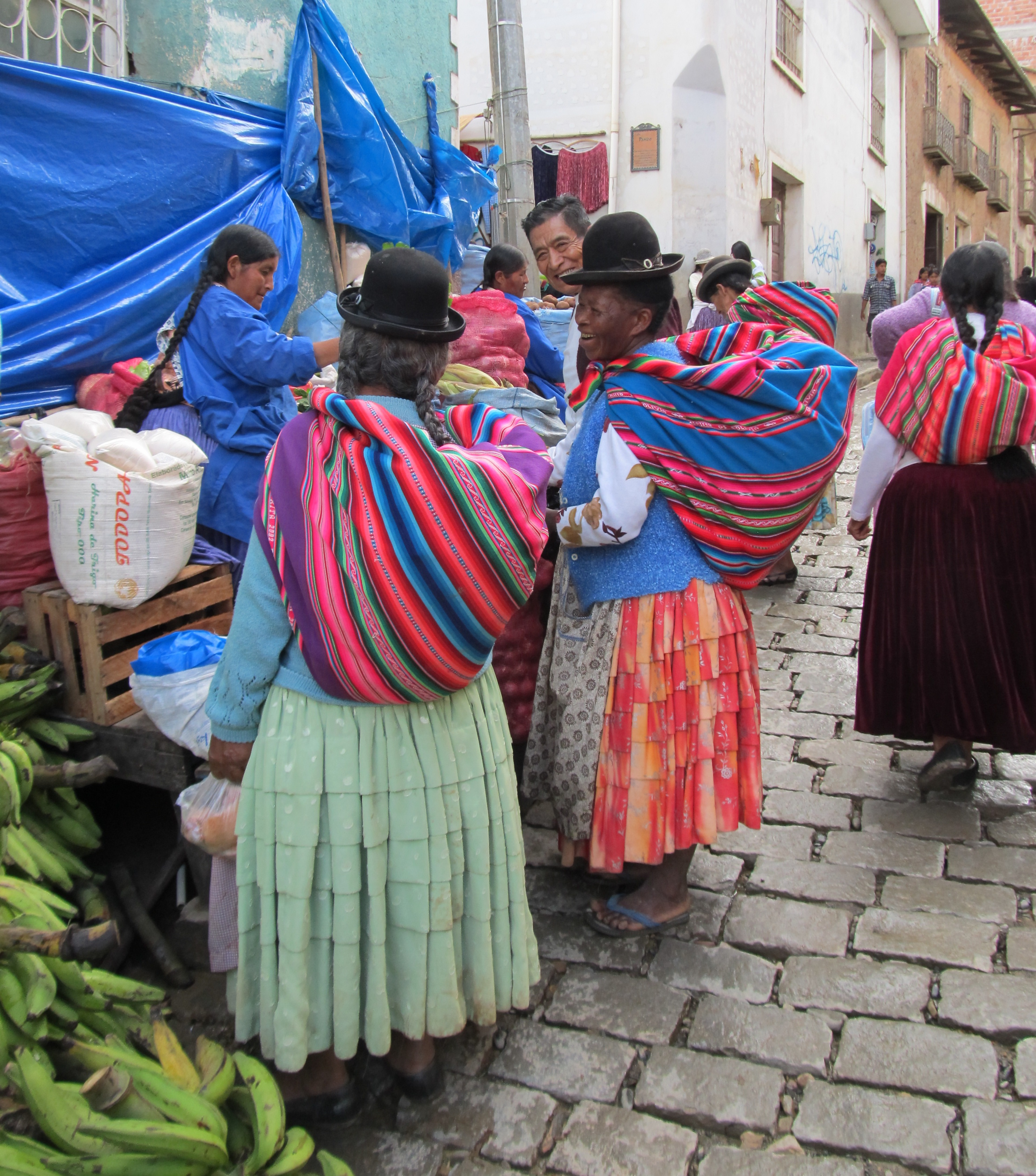
Afro-Bolivian chola, Coroico, Bolivia

Following the abolition of slavery in Bolivia in 1831, the women of the minority community of Afro-Bolivians in the Bolivian Yungas largely culturally assimilated into the pollera woman hybrid culture. They wear the same traditional dress and favor bowler hats and the traditional double braids, particularly visible in the saya music & dance tradition. Beginning in the 1990s, a movement within the Afro-Bolivian community for recognition of the Afro-Bolivians as their own distinct indigenous minority group has seen younger Afro-Bolivians culturally transitioning towards a more globalized African diaspora culture, notably rejecting the double braids for hair extensions.

=== Ecuador ===
The precursor to the pollera woman culture in Ecuador first developed in 17th century in the southern Ecuadorian Sierra of the Andes of Ecuador, particularly Cuenca, Azuay, when mestiza women began to be identified as "mestiza en ábito de india" (mestizas in 'Indian attire'). The region saw a high degree of racial miscegenation between indigenous Andeans, particularly the Cañari, with Afro-Ecuadorians and Spanish colonizers; mestizas in particular often occupied a social niche as concubines to social elites, conferring some social mobility within the casta system. In Cuenca in the 18th century, cholita developed as a term specifically for mestiza domestic workers, and the enforcement of European styles of dress as well as race-based sumptuary laws gave rise to the syncretic style of dress of modern Ecuadorian pollera women.

Ecuadorian anthropologist Piedad Peñaherrera de Costales identified the beginning of the modern hybrid pollera woman culture in the republican era of Ecuador: despite colonial sumptuary laws being abolished, clothing retained strong racial overtones, and pollera women developed a unique style of dress as an intermediate between indigenous and white/mestiza cultures.

=== Peru ===
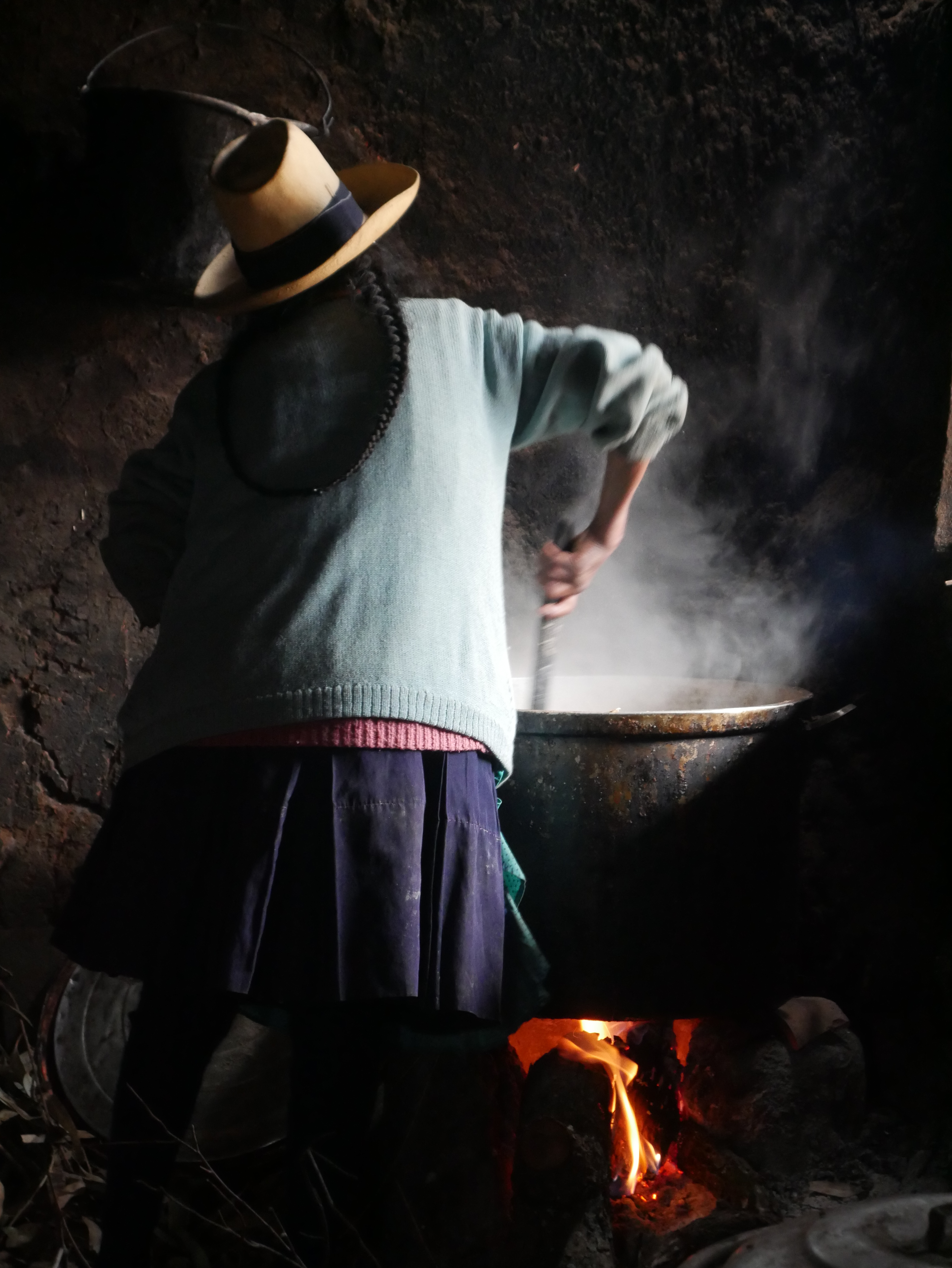
Pollera woman making chicha, Department of Cusco, Peru

Peruvian anthropologist Anibal Quijano identified the contemporary migration of mixed-race rural people to the cities as "cholification" (cholificación), wherein urbanizing rural mestizos adopted a hybrid culture between the urban criollo culture and the indigenous campesino culture. While cholification was positively propagandized by the Peruvian government towards fostering nationalism, particularly by dictator Juan Velasco Alvarado, cholos still face racism and colorism into the 21st century. As well, the cholo identity is often viewed by both cholos and outsiders as transitional in pursuit of upward mobility, between the poor indigenous way of life to a wealthy criollo one.

The Peruvian cumbia (chicha) music scene developed alongside 1960s cholification, itself a synthesis of Andean huayno and pop culture cumbia. Pollera women became visible as purveyors of chicha corn-beer bars that played such music, as well as in marketplaces.

Pollera women are otherwise frequently depicted in Peruvian pop culture as provincial, such as in María del Carmen Ureta's recurring character 'Órsola' with Tulio Loza, Gregorio (1985), and Madeinusa (2006). Pollera women in particular have been the target of popular ethnic humor through a string of cross-dressing comedy acts from the 1970s, including Guillermo Rossini as "Chola Eduviges" on Risas y salsa, Chola Chabuca on El reventonazo de la chola, and Jorge Benavides as "Paisana Jacinta" on the eponymic show.

== Traditional dress ==
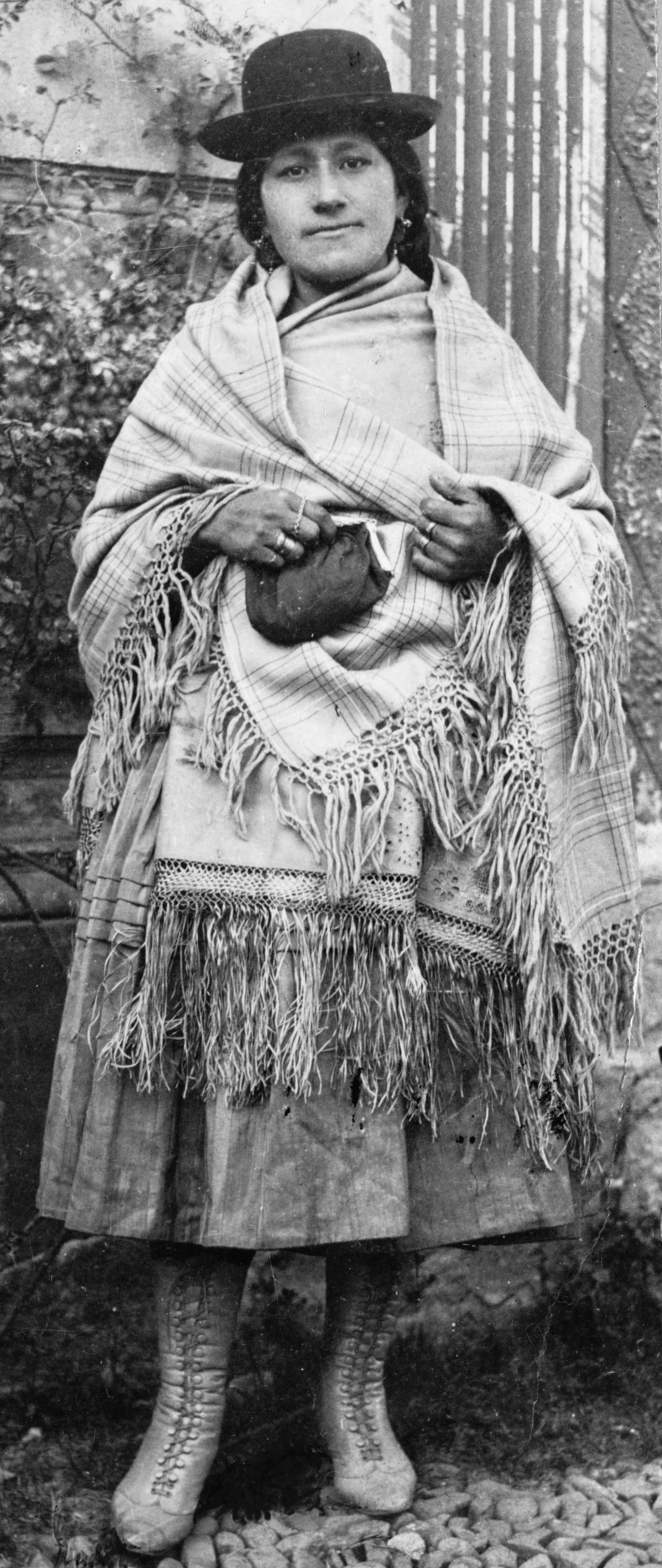
Pollera woman c. 1900-1920

The traditional dress of the pollera woman, also referred to as "chola style", is typified by a pollera skirt layered over one or more petticoats (enaguas); with enough petticoats, the pollera creates a bell-shaped silhouette similar to a hoop skirt. The rest of the outfit usually consists of a sweater worn over a blouse; a shawl (manta), comparable to the indigenous lliklla, held with a tupu pin; an apron (mantil) over the pollera; and pumps. Aguayos are used to carry things or as a swaddle. Pollera women traditionally wear their hair in two pleats on their back. Grills, gold teeth and tooth gems are popular status symbols among pollera women. La Paz pollera women wore ankle boots in the early to mid 1900s, but now largely wear low shoes or sandals. Cholas puneña (from Puno Department, Peru) wear a variant of the pollera called a "falda," which is not tiered like the pollera.

=== Bowler hat ===
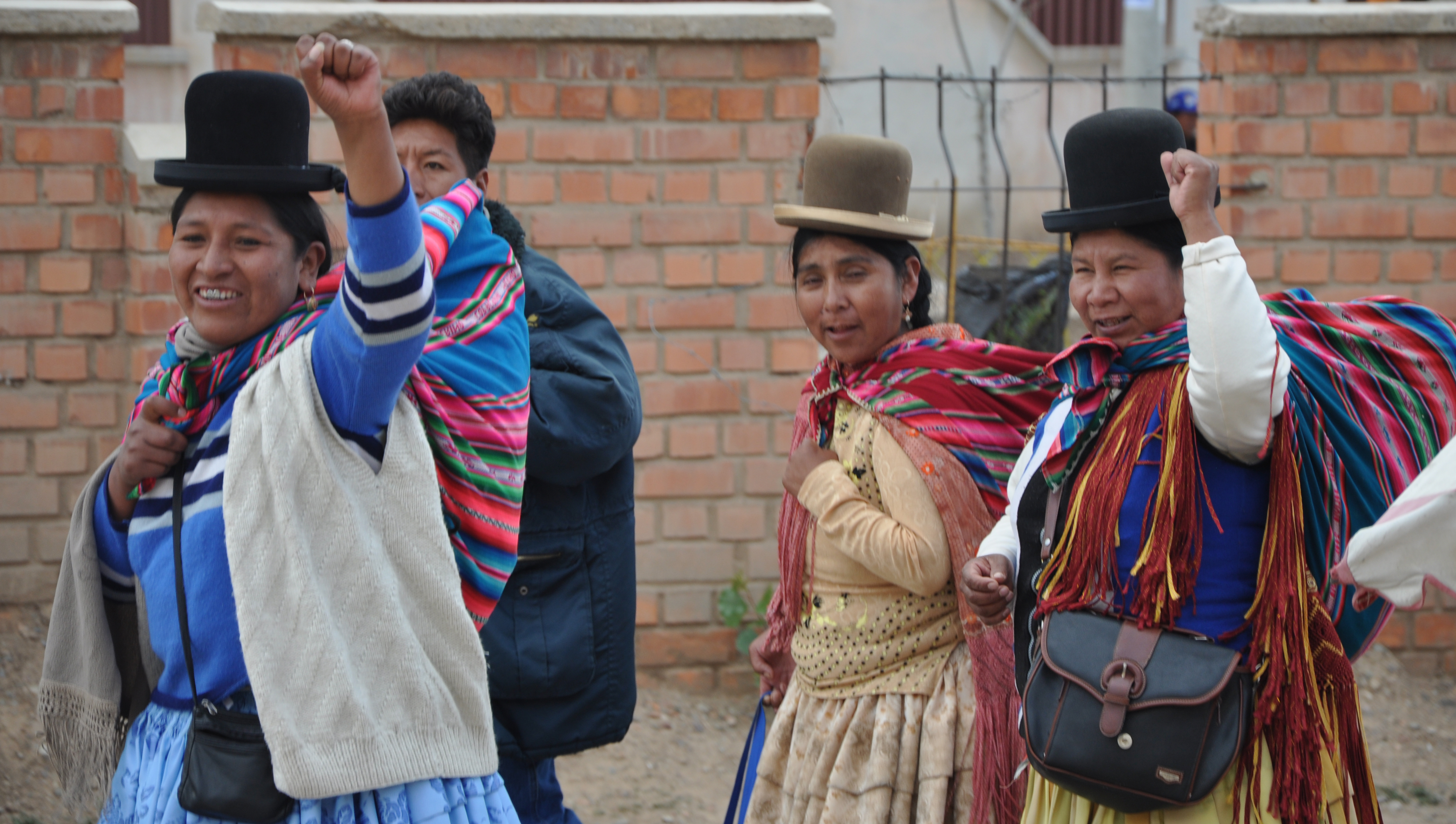
Pollera women with bombíns, Oruro

The bowler hat (bombín) is the typical hat of pollera woman in La Paz, Oruro, and Potosí of Bolivia, and Puno, Peru. Italian-imported bowler hats were first marketed in the Altiplano by Italian Peruvians based from Tacna, Peru during the War of the Pacific in the late 19th century. In 1914, Ludovico Antonio Galoppo of Piedmont and Marcelo Aglietti di Cossato founded the company "La Sodiedad Galoppo & Ormezzano" in Huanuni, Bolivia, which they quickly pivoted from a mining company store to exclusively importing Borsalino hats; at their request, Borsalino began to produce a lower-cost bowler hat aimed at pollera women, called the Capello da Ciola (Italian for 'chola hat').

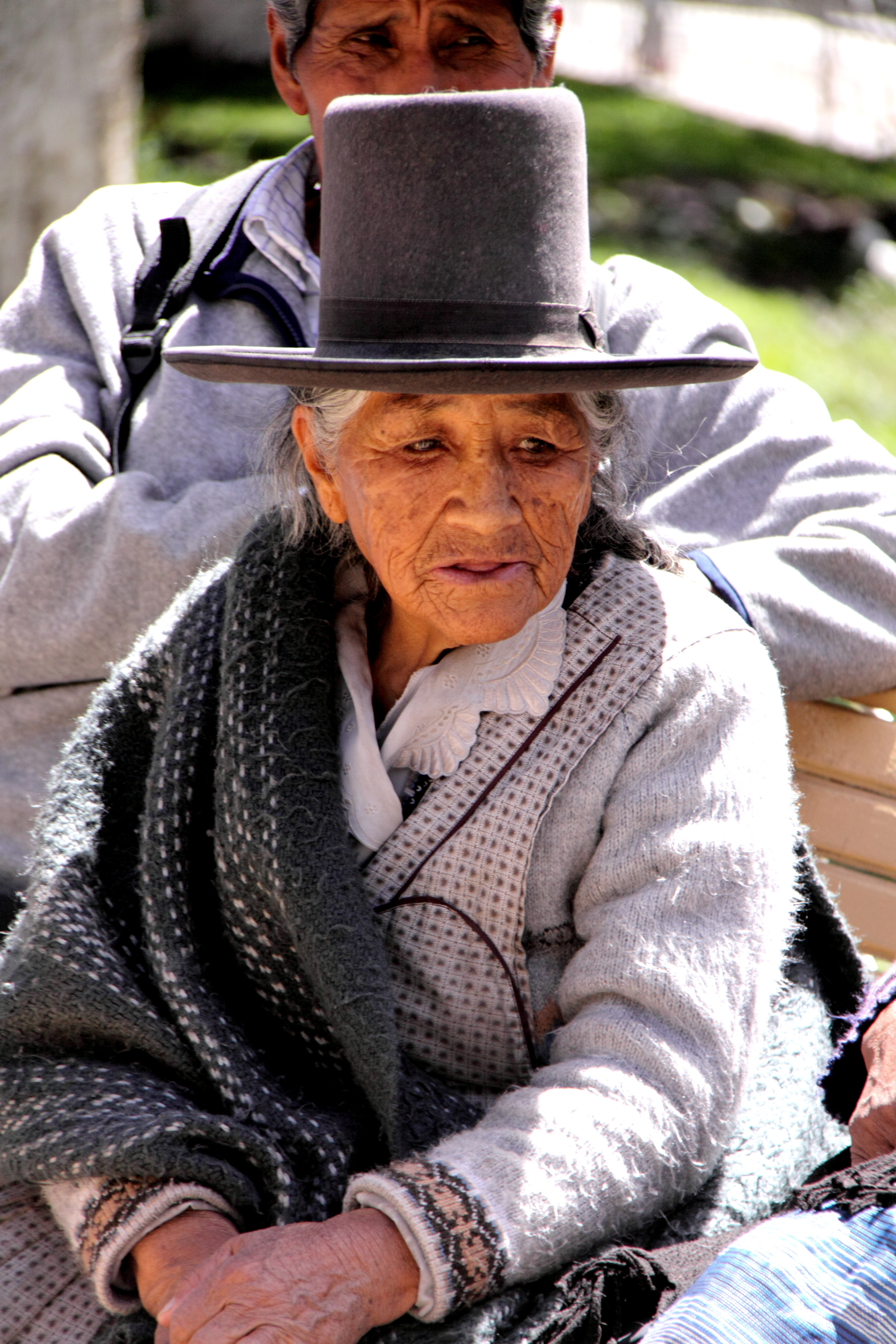
Pollera woman in Potosí-style bombín, taller and darker

Among the cholas paceña (from La Paz, Bolivia), the bowler hat is undersize and sits atop the head instead of snug; pollera women must balance the hat to keep it from falling off. It is usually decorated with tassels. The relationship status of a bombín-wearing pollera woman is communicated via the hat's position upon the head: a squarely straight hat indicates marriage, and a cocked hat means they are single.

The smaller size of paceña bowler hats is popularly attributed to the Buenos Aires-born, Italian Bolivian hat vendor Domingo Soligno of La Paz, who is said in the 1920s to have erroneously received a shipment of small brown bowler hats when he expected larger, black hats to be sold to rail workers; Soligno successfully sold the hats to pollera women instead, claiming the hats to be superior to the wider-brimmed cochabambino-style that had previously dominated La Paz chola fashion, and using their small size as a selling point to fit the braided hairstyle of the pollera woman. The small hats became a popular pollera women status symbol in La Paz. Despite trade disruptions during the World Wars, Borsalinos continued to be popular through most of the 20th century, but transitioned to local producers in the 1970s.

Potosí bowler hats are typically tall and black. Tarija hats are small, short and worn on the back on the head.

=== Tarro cochabambino ===
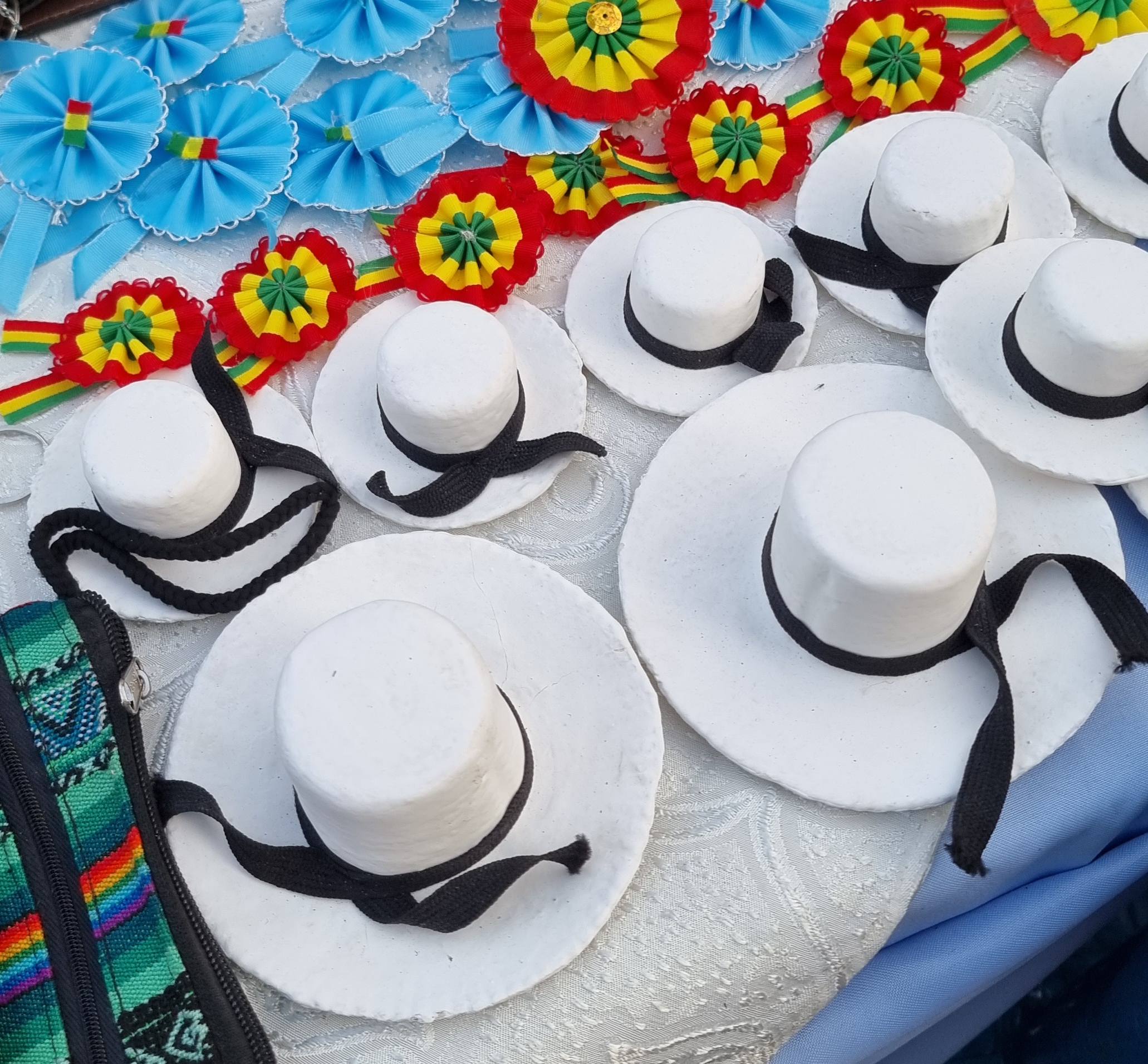
Tarros cochabaminos for sale

Cholas cochabambina (from Cochabamba, Bolivia; South Bolivian Quechua: cholita qhochala) traditionally wear the tarro cochabambino (Spanish for 'Cochabamba jar'; South Bolivian Quechua: sombrero qhochala), a wide-brimmed, tall white plastered sunhat with a black ribbon. Local legend claims the first pollera woman to wear the tarro was ordered by a Catholic priest to put a black ribbon on her hat to mark her as an adulterer; the pollera women of the community then wore the same black ribbons in support and deficance.

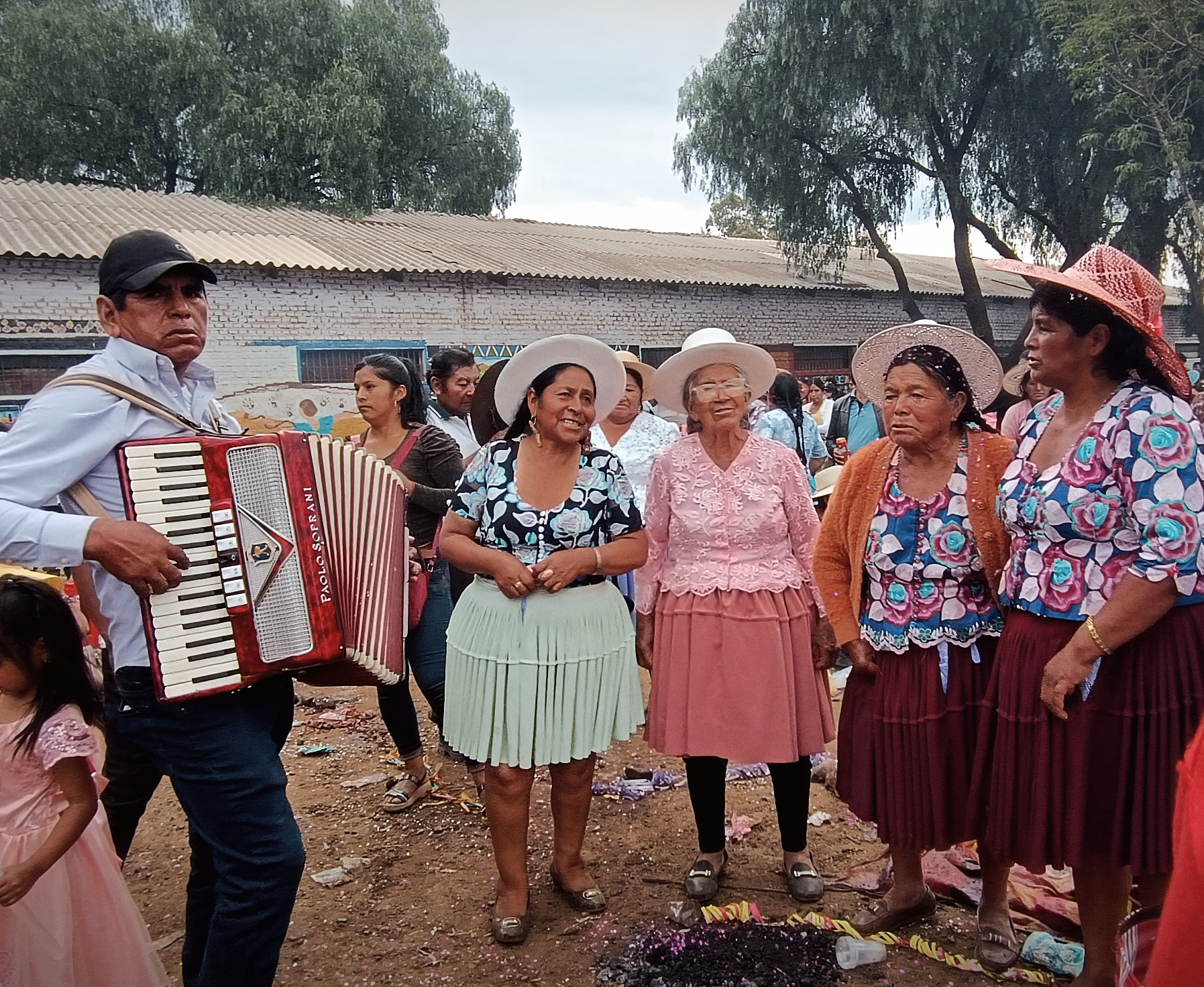
Encarnación Lazarte (third from right) singing at the Fiesta de Santa Vera Cruz wearing a tarro cochabambino, 2024

Per historian Sayuri Loza, the tarro cochabambino derives from the capotain, whose traditional beaver fur construction was replaced with more available straw and plaster. Per folklorist Juan Carlos Rodríguez Clavijo, the hat in its present state was initially popular across the Altiplano after the promulgation of Spanish-style dress in the late 19th century: some regions later changed their headwear, whilst other introduced changes, like a yellow-hued variant in Cliza and Punata. The height of a pollera woman's tarro cochabambino was a status symbol of their wealth. The hat is heavy and very delicate due to being covered in plaster. In modern times, lower-crown hats are preferred for comfort, particularly among pollera women of Valle Alto.

Tarros cochabambino have been largely relegated to dancewear, particularly for the Diablada dance. Young cholas cochabambina in the 21st century have transitioned to colorful plastic hats called a chapaco (in reference to flowers), also called an "intercultural" or a qhochala. These hats are much lighter, cheaper and more resilient than tarros cochabambino.

=== Tullmas ===
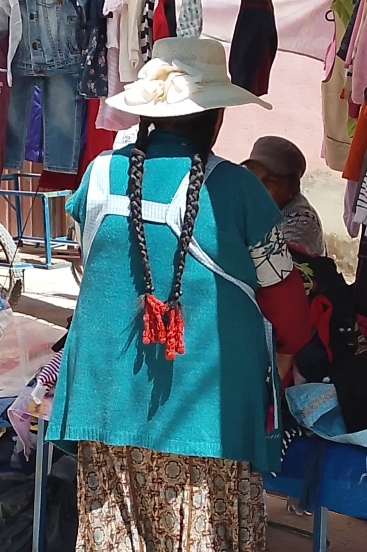
Red tullmas worn on traditional braids

A tullma (Quechua language) is a beaded hair ornament traditionally made from llama or vicuna hair. Historically, the tullma was not dyed, having natural laminid hair tones. After the Spanish conquest of the Incan Empire, the tullma began to be woven into braids. Following the Chaco War period of the 1930s, synthetic fibers and brightly colored dyes gained popularity.

The color and structure of tullmas varies regionally: among pollera women of Cochabamba and Chuquisaca Department, red and orange is preferred; on Lake Titicaca, the tullma is worn with colorful pom-poms; in La Paz, cholas paceñas prefer natural laminid tones; north of Potosí, the beads are substituted for glass petals; in the Interandean Valles, sequins and heavy beads are preferred; and around Tarabuco, heavy pearls are worn.

=== Gallery of regional styles ===
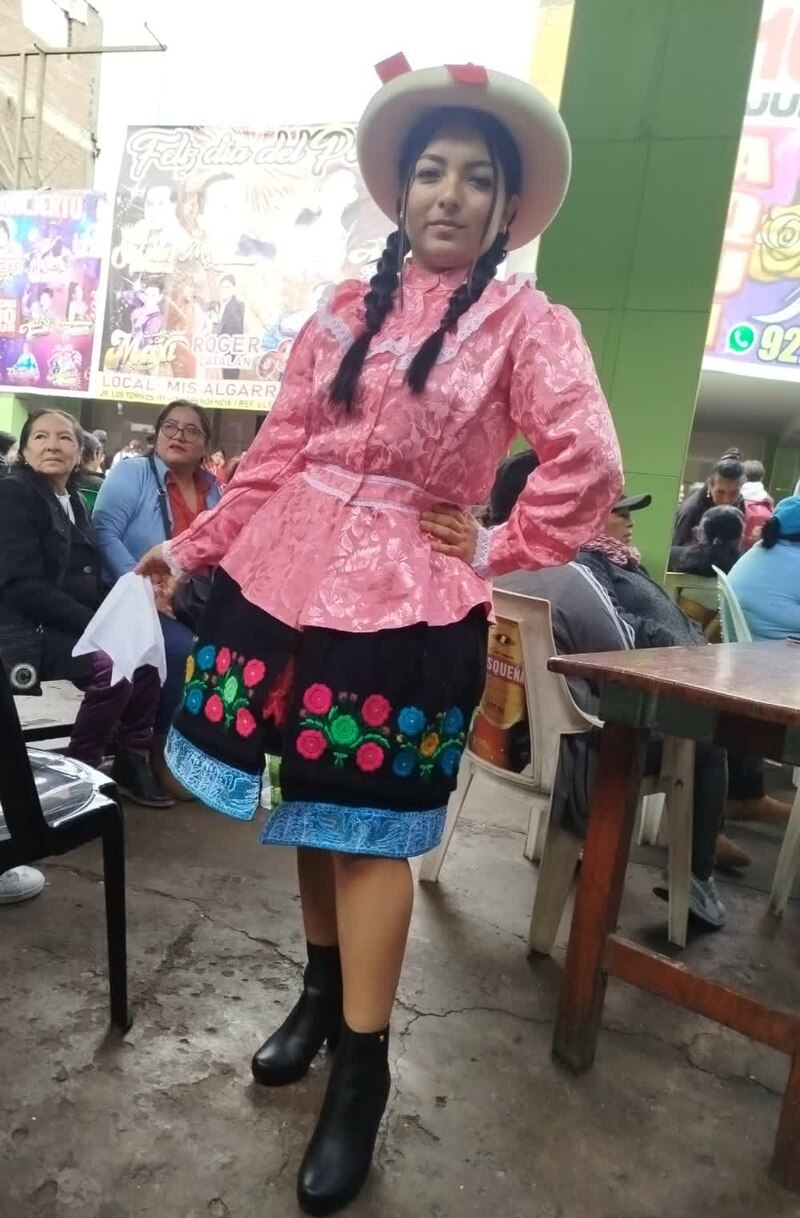
Pomabamba province, Peru

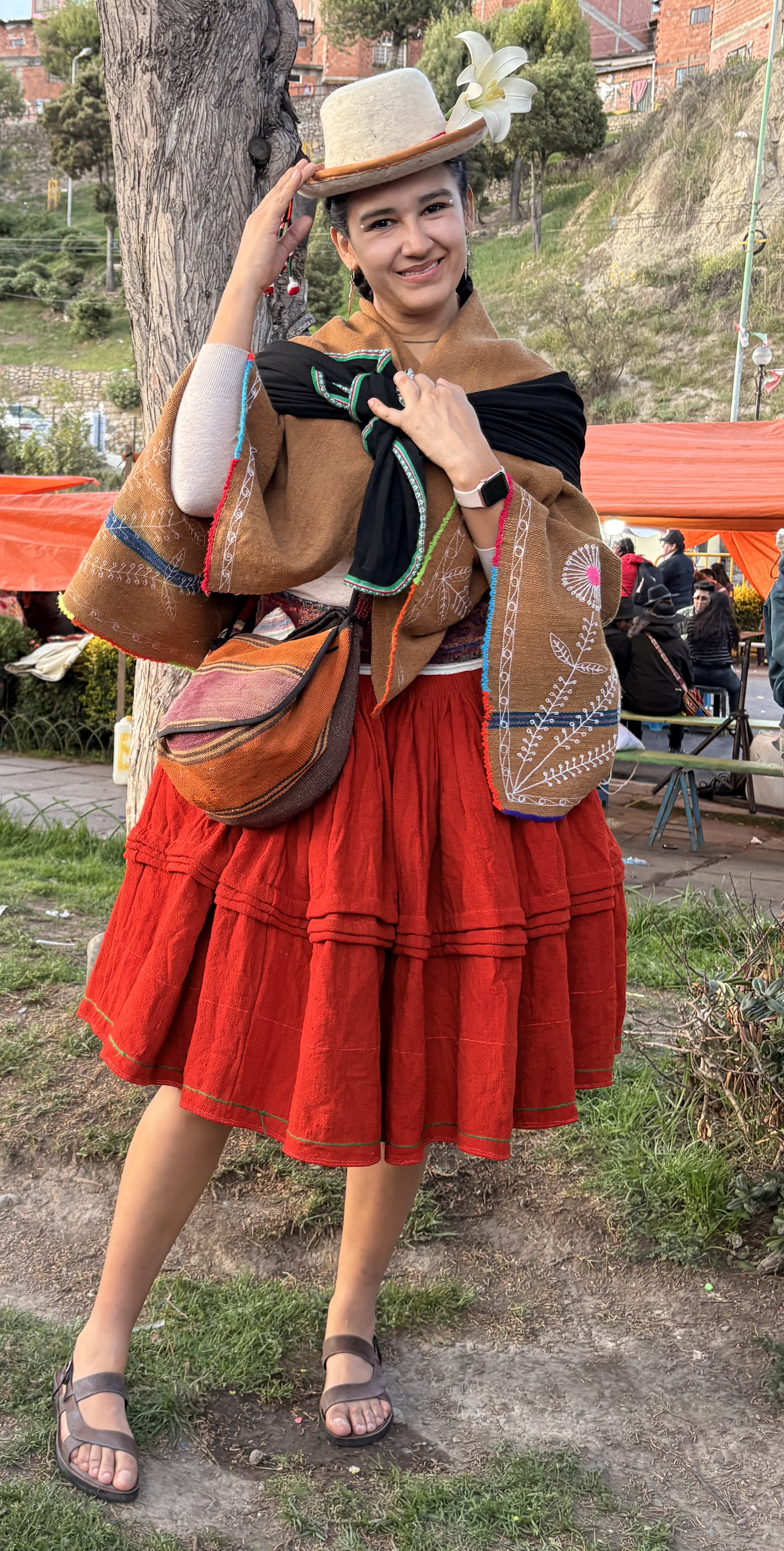
Eliodoro Camacho Province, Bolivia

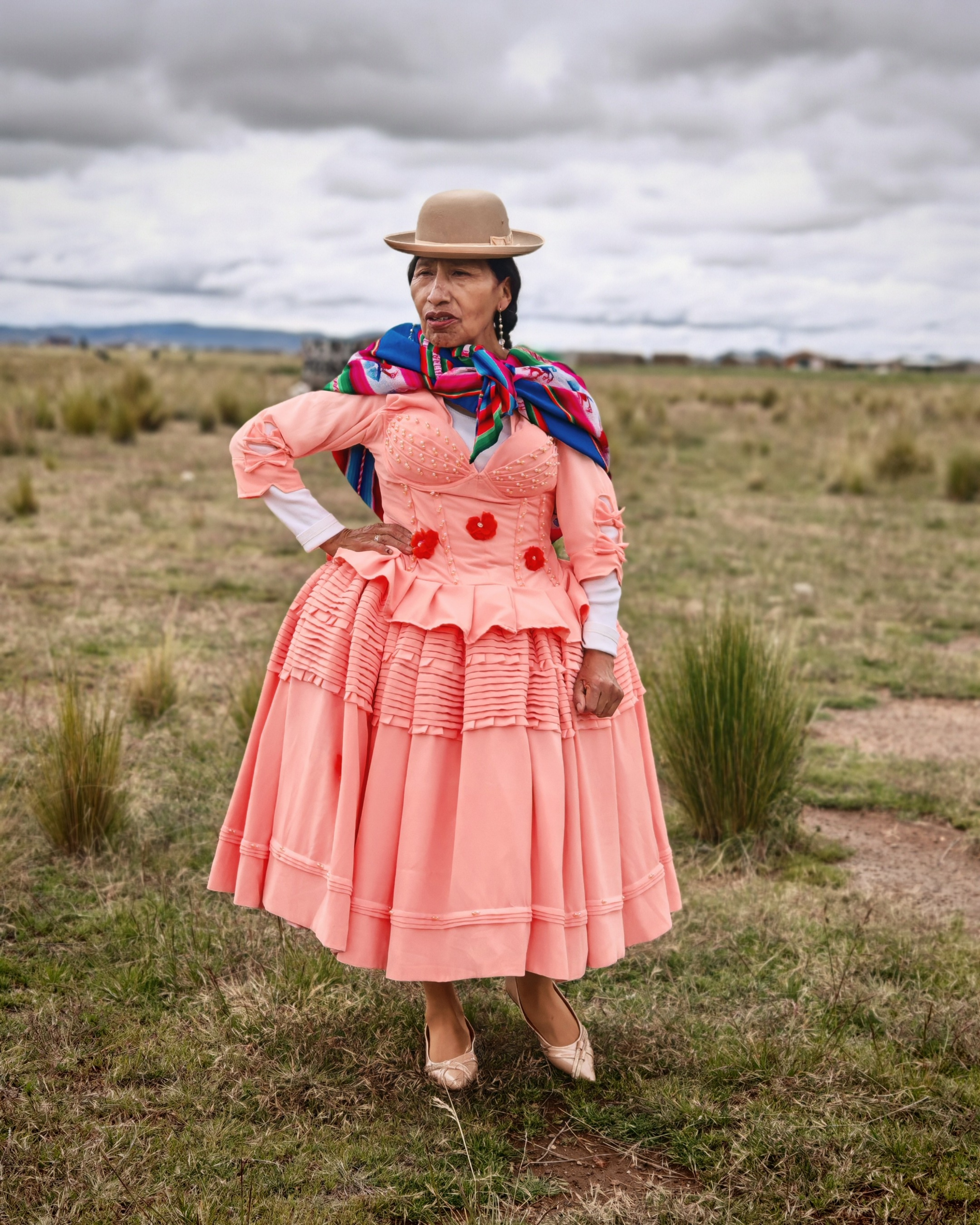
Puno, Peru

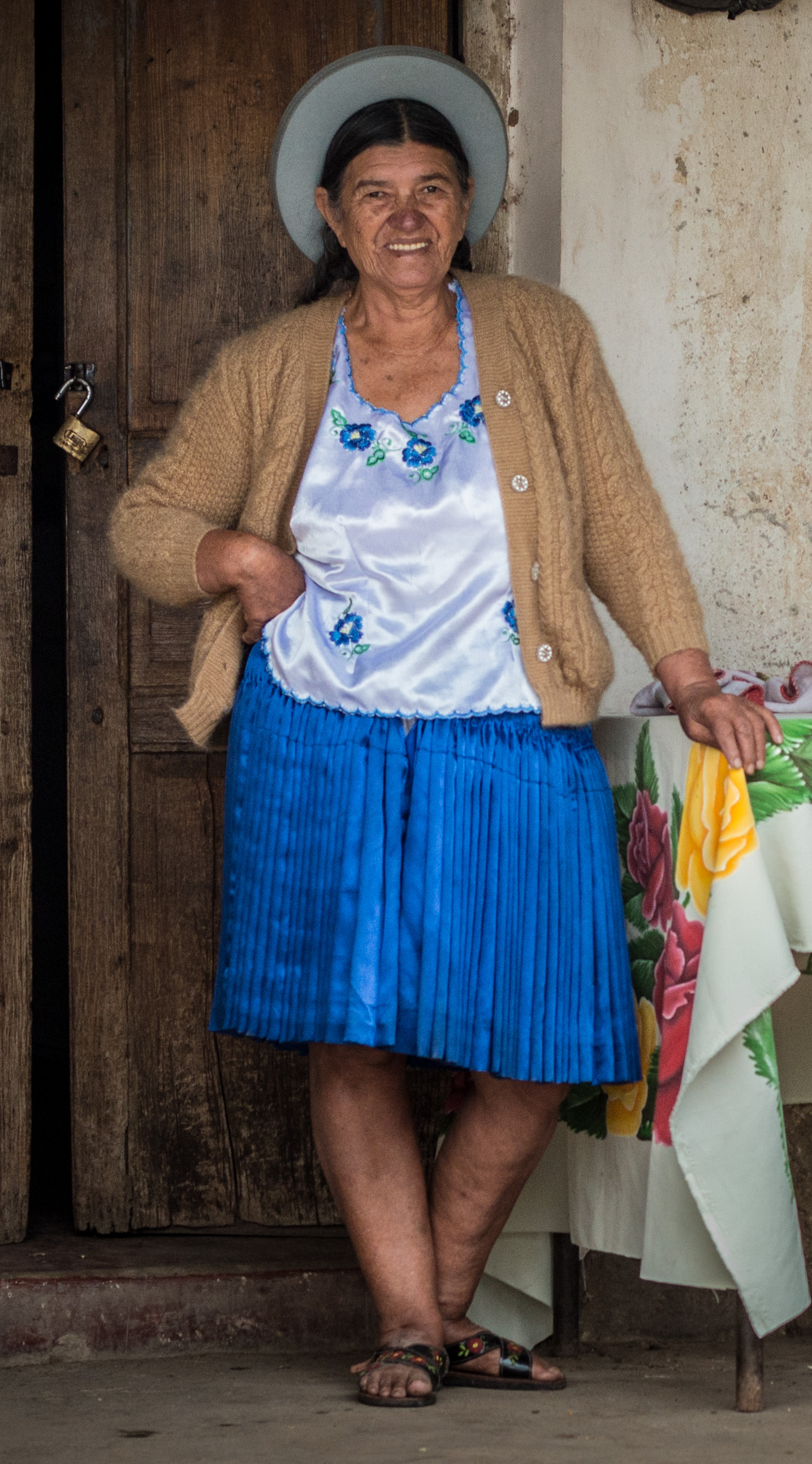
Chapaca in Tarija, Bolivia

== Activities ==
Pollera women are stereotypically visible in urban settings as street vendors and shopkeeps. In La Paz, local pollera women (cholas paceñas) street food vendors are known for selling an epononymous chola sandwich, made from pernil.

Pollera women in traditional dress feature in baile folklórico dances, especially during celebrations and holidays, such as Candlemas (Fiesta de la Virgen de la Candelaria) and the Fiesta del Gran Poder. At weddings of pollera women, the mothers and grandmothers of the couple are expected to dress in pollera style. Beauty pageants have developed over the 21st century in Bolivia as a place to flaunt pollera style. The most prominent is Cholita Paceña, a La Paz pageant for pollera women including Aymara language demonstrations and baile folklórico.

Other pollera women-centric activities include:

- Cholita, a Bolivian lifestyle magazine aimed at pollera women audiences, founded in July 2014 by editor Ester Chaym
- El Alto, Bolivia hired cholas in 2013 to be traffic police whilst in traditional chola garb.

=== Sports in traditional dress ===
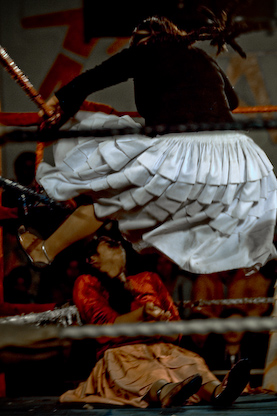
A cholita wrestler in a women's professional wrestling match, performing a senton

Multiple pollera women groups have formed to participate in sports entertainment and extreme sports whilst wearing pollera style clothing. Pollera women engage in professional wrestling matches as "cholita luchadoras"; the Fighting Cholitas are a group of Bolivian professional wrestlers. The Cholita Climbers are Bolivian mountain climbers. ImillaSkate is a Bolivian skateboarding club from Cochabamba. The groups largely advocate cultural heritage and women's empowerment for pollera women and indigenous South Americans.

=== Gallery of activities ===
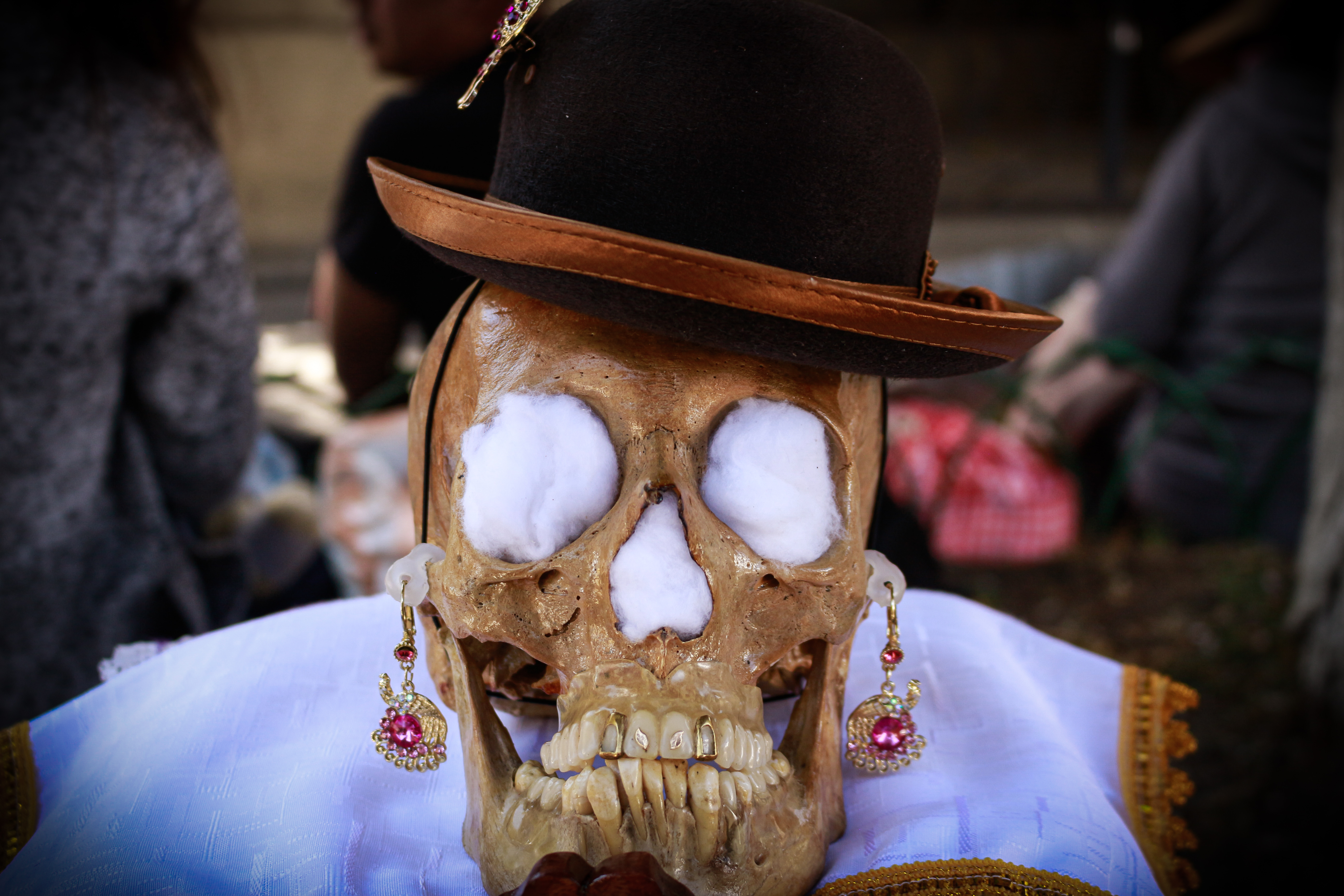
Pollera woman ñatita with bombín; note teeth & ear jewelry

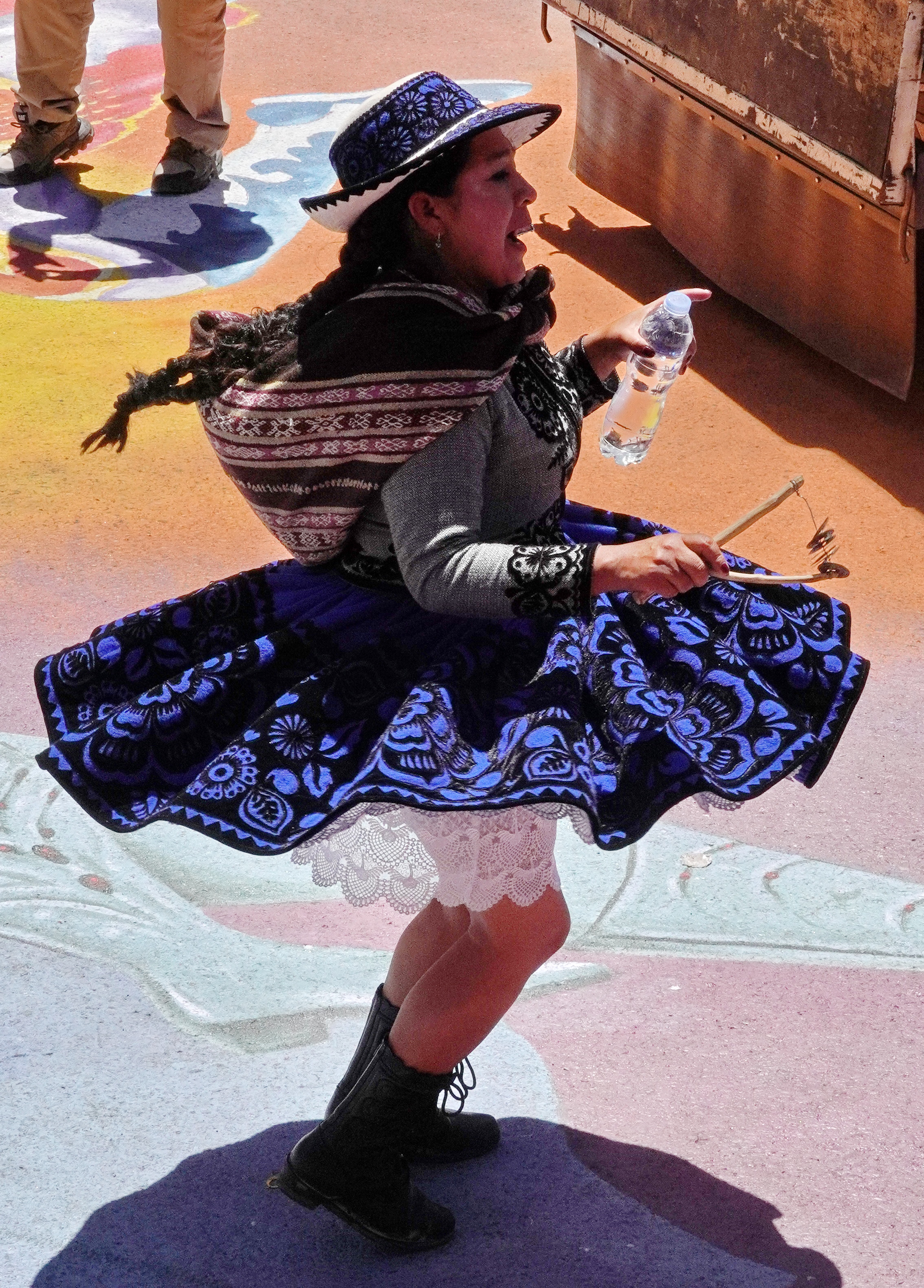
Pollera woman in Puno, Peru performing the kullawada during a Candlemas celebration

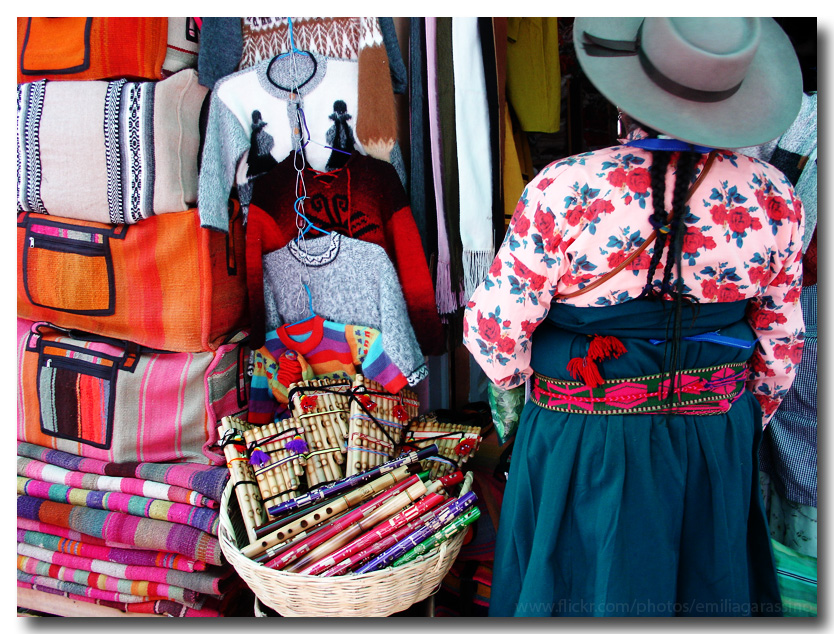
Vendor in Villazón, Bolivia

== In popular culture ==
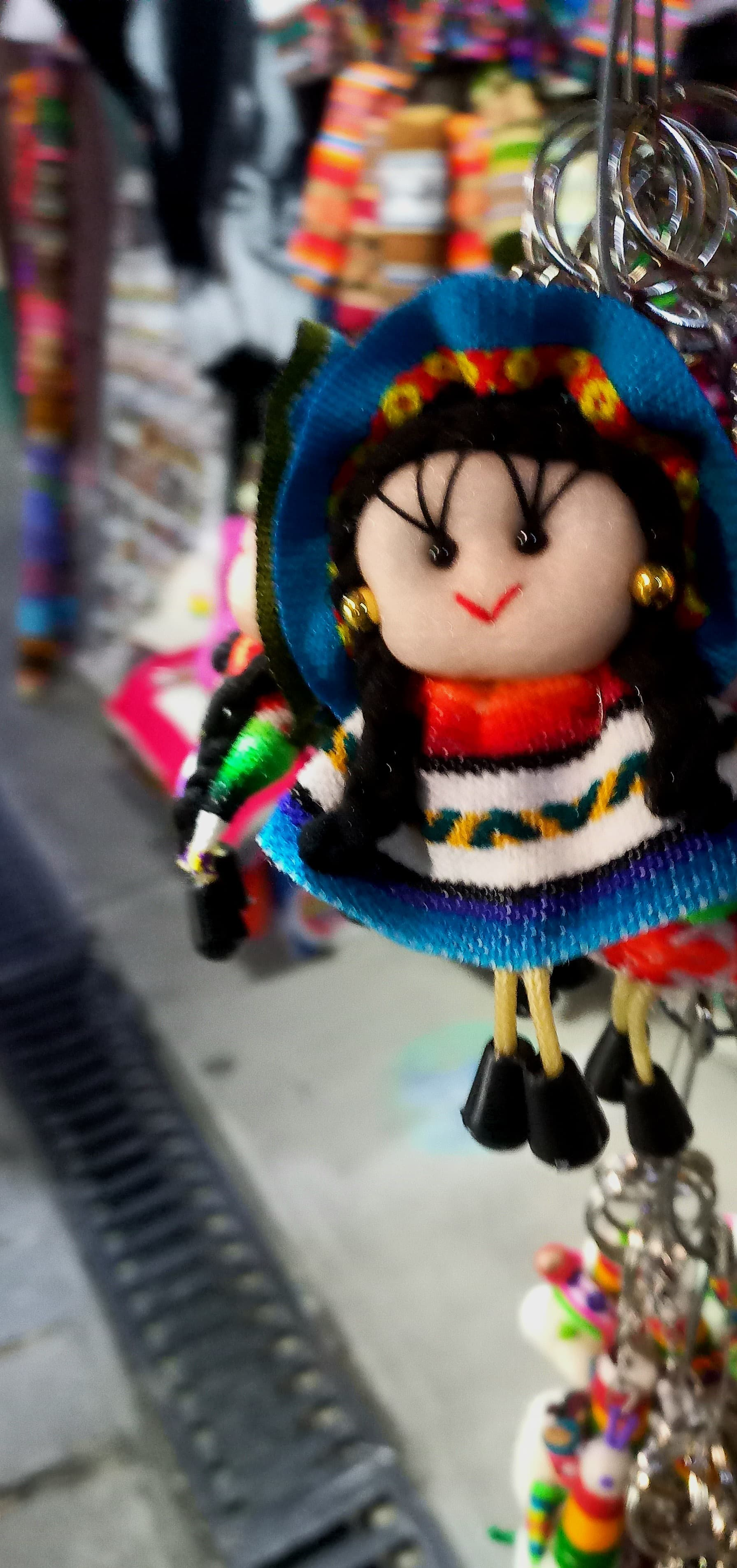
Bolivian pollera woman keychain

In Bolivia, Super Cholita is a 2007-debut superhero comic book starring a young Bolivian pollera woman. In Peru, Chola Power is a superhero comic starring a young Peruvian woman.

Pollera women are a frequent subject of folk art and handicrafts such as dolls.

== List of pollera women ==
- Petronila Infantes (1911 – 1991), anarchosyndicalist and founder of the Sindicato de Culinarias
- Cholita Rivero, of The Inca Taky Trio
- Silvia Lazarte (1964-2020), president of the 2006–2007 Bolivian Constituent Assembly
- Justa Canaviri, celebrity chef
- Remedios Loza, journalist and host
- Lidia Patty, politician and trade unionist

== See also ==
- China poblana
- Punjabi paranda
- Chagra
- Neo-Andean architecture
