= Chola sandwich =

Bolivian sandwich

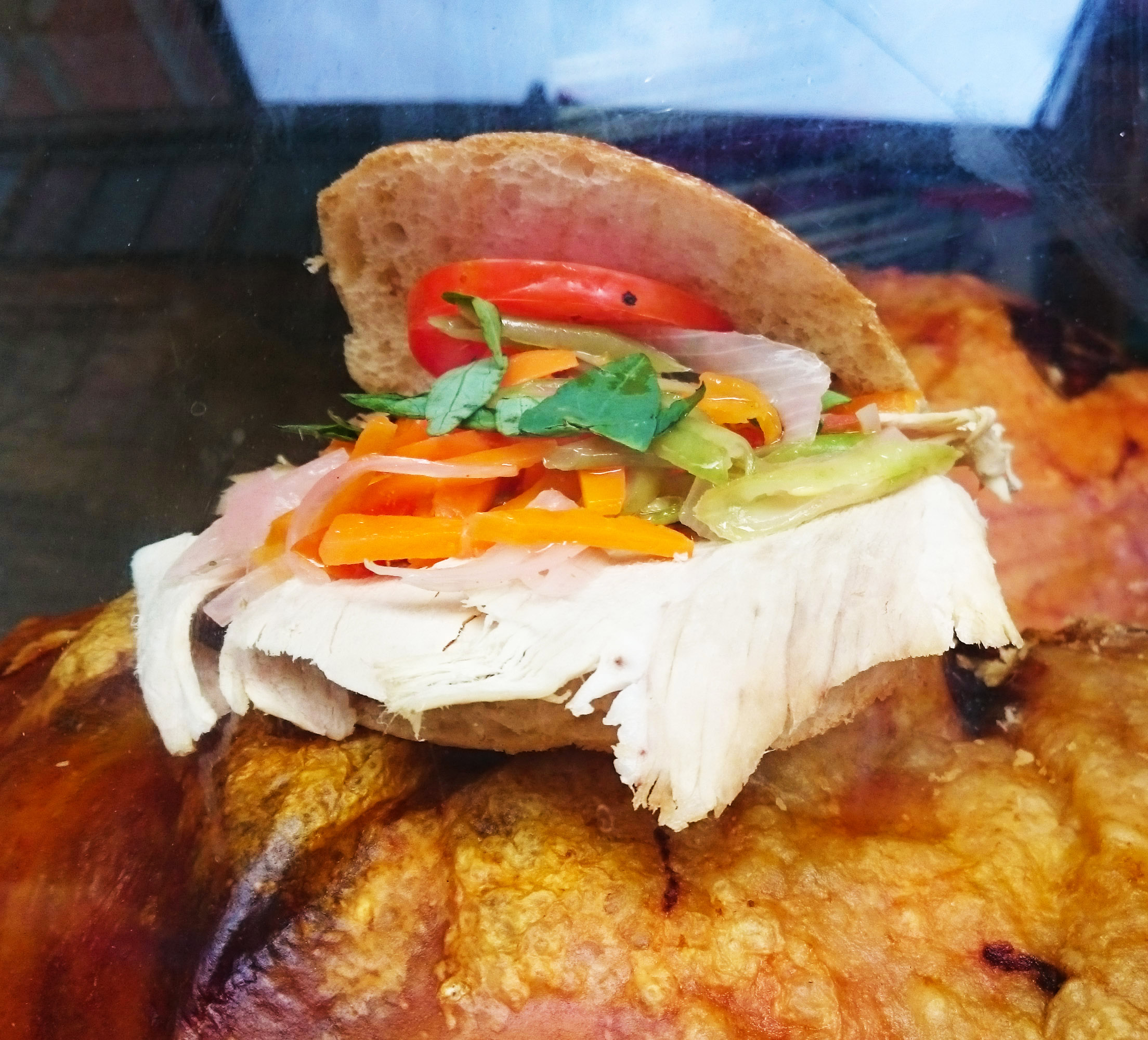
- A typical chola sandwich atop pernil
- Alternative names: sándwich de chola, sanduíche de chola
- Type: Sandwich
- Place of origin: Bolivia
- Region or state: La Paz
- Associated cuisine: Bolivian cuisine
- Created by: Cholas of La Paz (Cholas paceñas)
- Invented: 1908 (introduced); 1970s (modern)
- Main ingredients: Pernil, sarnita, escabeche, tomato, torresmo
- Ingredients generally used: Aji, llajua

The chola sandwich (Spanish: sándwich de chola; also sanduíche de chola) is a Bolivian cuisine sandwich originating in La Paz. Chiefly made from pernil, a Latin cuisine roast pork, its creators and namesake are the chola street vendors of La Paz (chola paceña).

== Preparation and consumption ==
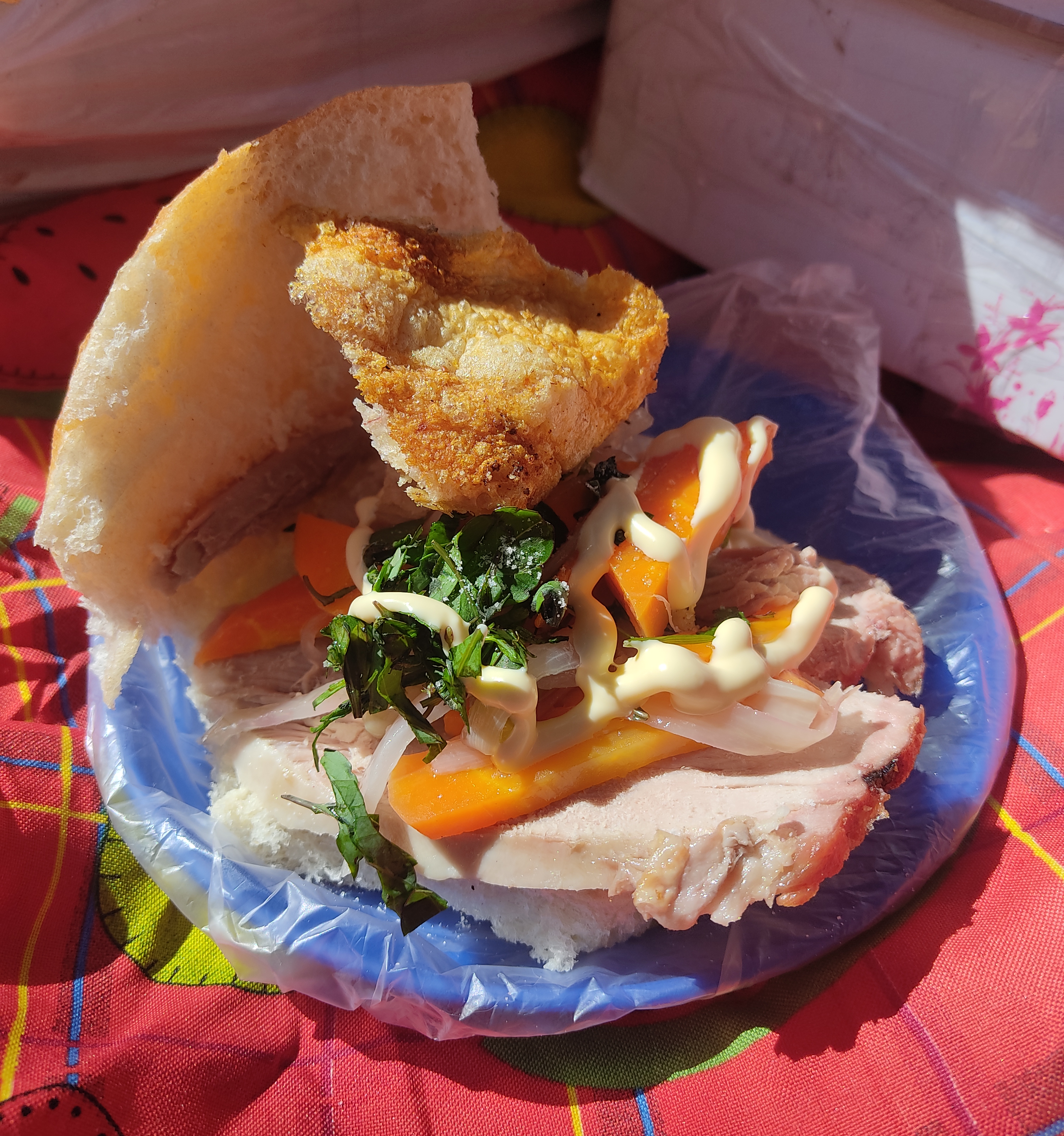
Chola sandwich from the July 16th Fair, El Alto, Bolivia

The chola sandwich is built on either a marraqueta, an Andean bread roll, or a sarnita, a marraqueta variant with a baked cheese topping. The filling consists of slices of pernil, a marinated and slow-roasted pork leg; escabeche, a pickled relish of carrots, onions and peppers; aji or llajua chili sauce; tomato; and topped with a torresmo, or pork rind. Other toppings like mayonnaise may be included.

== History ==
The chola sandwich developed in the early 20th century from the 1880s Peruvian cuisine sandwich, the butifarra, made from the eponymous botifarra sausage. It was introduced in 1908 by chola street food vendors (caseritas) sold at the southern La Paz park "Parque La Florida", colloquially and eponymically known as "Las Cholas" for the preponderance of chola caseritas; it was an adaptation of their own lunch preparations. Per Bolivian ethnologist Antonio Paredes Candia, the botiferra was first interpolated in Bolivia as a beef sandwich topped with chorrillana, a relish of tomato, onion and locoto chilies. The chola sandwich began to take form in the 1950s with the addition of llajua and torresmo, then became its modern permutation in the 1970s with the change to pernil over beef.

The chola sandwich was recognized by the La Paz Municipality as one of seven core dishes for the annual July observance of La Paz Gastronomy Month. In 2024, a celebration of the gastronomy month included the creation of a two-meter diameter chola sandwich.

== See also ==
- Bondiola sandwich
- Chacarero
- Ham sandwich
