= Cecilia Llusco Alaña =

Bolivian mountaineer

Cecilia Llusco Alaña (born 1985), an Indigenous Bolivian mountaineer, founder of the Cholitas Escaladoras Bolivianas or Cholita Climbers of Bolivia, has scaled mountains in South America, including Huayna Potosi, a 6,088 meter high peak in Bolivia. She works as one of only about ten Indigenous Aymara women mountaineering guides. Instead of wearing modern technical or thermal mountaineering clothing, she climbs in her Indigenous costume. This includes the pollera, a brightly colored, gathered skirt with many underskirts. She carries her equipment in k'eperinas, or Aguayo, traditionally woven shawls or blankets, carried on her back. Since climbing Huayna Potosi she and the group have gone on to scale higher mountains such as Aconcagua, a 6,961meter peak in Argentina and the highest mountain in the Americas.

== Life and career ==
Llusco is from an Indigenous Aymara family. Her father was a trekking guide and Llusco started working in tourism with him at the age of eight. Tourism in Bolivia is traditionally a man's field but Llusco has now completed two entry level mountaineering courses and would like to travel abroad to do more. The main season for tourist high climbing is between May and November so the work is seasonal. Not able to buy her own equipment, Llusco has to rent it as she needs it.

The word cholita has been used to derogate Aymara and Quechua women who have even been banned from using public transport, from using public spaces and have had limited employment opportunities. Now Aymara women are challenging these negative associations in many fields. One example is by reclaiming the word by using it in contexts such as extreme sports. Llusco helped to found the group known as the Cholitas Escaladoras.

In December 2015, eleven members of the Cholita Escaladoras, some of whom were mountaineering guides, high altitude cooks or porters, scaled Huayna Potosi, a 19,974ft (6,088-meter) Andean peak, part of the Cordillera Real mountain range near La Paz.

In 2019, five women in the group, including Cecilia Llusco, climbed Aconcagua, a 6,961m above sea level mountain in Argentina. The journey up this, the highest mountain in the Americas, is captured in the documentary film Cholitas (2019).

The Cholitas Escaladoras are part of a wider movement, fighting for women's rights in sport. For example, there are the cholitas luchadoras, the fighting cholitas and the cholitas skaters.

== Personal life ==
Llusco and her partner of 20 years have two children, a son and a daughter who is also a Cholita Escaladora. Llusco has expressed a desire to tackle Mount Everest if she can raise enough money.
