= Justa Canaviri =

Bolivian celebrity chef and human rights activist

- Born: Justa Elena Canaviri Choque; 13 August 1963 (age 62); La Paz, Bolivia
- Occupations: Celebrity chef, human rights activist
- Years active: 2000-present
- Known for: traditional Bolivian cuisine

Justa Canaviri (born 13 August 1963) is an Aymara, Bolivian woman who has become noted for dressing in pollera women style, and her outspokenness on issues such as family violence, LGBT rights, and indigenous rights. Often called Bolivia's most recognizable chola, Canaviri changed the face of Bolivian television, when she began broadcasting her cooking show by introducing for the first time an indigenous woman as the main presence. In 2014, she was honored as one of the BBC's 100 Women Series.

== Early life ==
Justa Elena Canaviri Choque was born on 13 August 1963 in La Paz, Bolivia to Filomena Choque and Ambrosio Canaviri. The second of four daughters in the family, Canaviri studied at the Tecnimod Academy with a focus on sewing and design, social work and took additional training in Bolivian gastronomy, studying the national food and pastries. She raised three children, Indira, Addis and José, working as a house cleaner to support them.

== Career ==
In 1999, Canaviri met the Bolivian screenwriter Guillermo Aguirre, who thought that she could work in television. He helped her secure work as a presenter on a television program, "La Cancha", which introduced products to consumers. After that show ended, she worked as a host on two short-lived programs, "Sábado Estelar" and "Fiebre de Sábado con la Canasta de La Justa". Because she could not find additional television work and she liked working in the medium, she wrote a program called "La Wislla de La Justa" and began pitching it to various independent producers. Radio Televisión Popular (RTP Bolivia), agreed to produce the show in 2002. Canaviri's program centered on food, but with Canaviri discussing political and social issues, as well as presenting cultural traditions. Within three months the program had become a hit and she began to think of producing it independently. After ten months, she went to work at PAT (TV channel) and the program was renamed "La Justa", where she remained for the next three years.

Canaviri was a trendsetter. Before she went on the air, television in Bolivia was dominated by those of European ancestry. Proud of her heritage, Canaviri wanted her program to depict who she really was. She wore her hair in braids, topped with the bowler hat typically worn by cholas, and the traditional multi-pleated polleras. In 2006, Canaviri moved her show to Bolivia TV. where she continued to present lively conversation and recipes. In 2013, when she felt that Bolivia TV wanted a younger image and was trying to censor her discussions, Canaviri expanded her options and began airing her program on Virgen de Copacabana TV in El Alto, becoming the first presenter to air a program on two separate channels.

Canaviri broke the concepts of beauty and stereotypes associated with indigenous women, becoming "the most famous chef on Bolivian television". She discussed such topics as weight, violence against women and abuse, discrimination against indigenous people and their rights, and LGBT issues in Bolivia. In 2014, she was honored by the BBC as one of the most inspirational 100 Women of the year. That same year, she was selected by Kimberly-Clark Bolivia as one of the women models in their golden years who would represent their Poise brand of products. She has become one of the most influential women in Bolivia and has participated as a chef and in workshops for women in Argentina, Brazil, Chile, Panama, Peru and the United States.
