= Yola Mamani =

Bolivian radio personality, YouTuber, activist, and domestic worker

- Born: Omasuyos Province
- Education: Universidad Mayor de San Andres

Yolanda "Yola" Mamani is a Bolivian Chola (Note: She identifies as a chola, a historical pejorative for pollera women that has since been reclaimed by community members in Bolivia.) radio personality, YouTuber, activist, and domestic worker known for her advocacy for pollera women. She is best known for her YouTube channel Chola Bocona (en: The loud-mouthed Chola). She is a long-time member of the anarcho-feminist collective Mujeres Creando, and hosted their radio program Soy trabajadora del hogar con orgullo y dignidad (en: I am a domestic worker with pride and dignity) for seven years.

== Biography ==
Mamani was born in Santa Maria Grande, a small community in Omasuyos Province, Bolivia. She went to La Paz for the first time with her aunt at the age of nine, and became a domestic worker caring for children. At eleven, she ran away with a friend due to her employer not treating her well. She subsequently began working with a new employer.

Her first dispute with her employer came when she was 13 and decided to wear a pollera, traditional to her culture. They subsequently disputed when she decided to go back to school while working at 16. In 2007, she decided to study social work, but was immediately fired by her employers. She filed a report and received compensation, but it was insufficient. She had to return home, but went to La Paz again a few months later and became employed by a different employer. Her employers paid her far less than minimum wage. However, she has stated that she misses them at times, especially the children.

In 2009, while still working as a domestic worker, she began as a radio producer and host for a show, Soy trabajadora del hogar con orgullo y dignidad, by Mujeres Creando. She first heard about it at a meeting of the Domestic Worker's Union. She spent seven years in charge of the show, and left her job as a domestic worker to work on the show, which aired episodes daily.

She has also hosted a news show on the same channel, run by Mujeres Creando. Her shows were the only women's news bulletin in Bolivia.

She also returned to school, studying sociology at the Universidad Mayor de San Andres.

She currently hosts a show called Cuento Q'Ipi on Bolivian radio. She is also an outspoken activist for pollera women and has written about cultural traditions and cultural unfairness on her blog. She has been cited as one of the most influential feminist activists in Bolivia. She has stated one of her goals is to write a book, and another is to earn her master's degree.

She has also launched her own YouTube channel, Chola Bocona, which she leads with a team of three as technical support. She has stated she took the channel's name, meaning loud-mouthed Chola, from when she was berated by employers for being an activist. On the channel, she talks about politics and discrimination. She has stated part of her motivation was to show that cholas are of the modern world and not stuck in the past.
