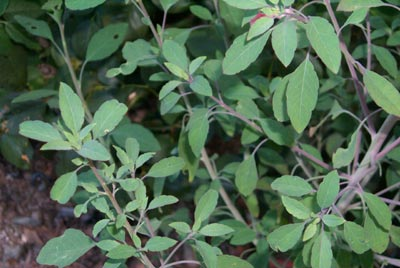

Scientific classification
- Kingdom: Plantae
- Clade: Tracheophytes
- Clade: Angiosperms
- Clade: Eudicots
- Clade: Asterids
- Order: Asterales
- Family: Asteraceae
- Genus: Porophyllum
- Species: P. ruderale

Binomial name
- Porophyllum ruderale (Jacq.) Cass.

= Porophyllum ruderale =

Plant in the sunflower family

Porophyllum ruderale, commonly known as pápalo or quillquiña, is an herbaceous annual plant whose leaves can be used for seasoning food. The taste has been described as "somewhere between arugula, cilantro and rue". The plant is commonly grown from central Mexico to the Andes for use in salsas.

The plant is easy to grow from seed in a well-drained soil, which should be allowed to dry between waterings. The Mexican varieties have round light green leaves, whereas the Andean varieties are smaller with narrower purplish leaves. Tepegua varieties (var. P. r. macrocephalum, formerly considered a distinct species) have darker green leaves with purple margins. When fully grown, Mexican varieties measure about 150 cm (5 ft) in height and 90 cm (3 ft) in diameter.

== Culture ==
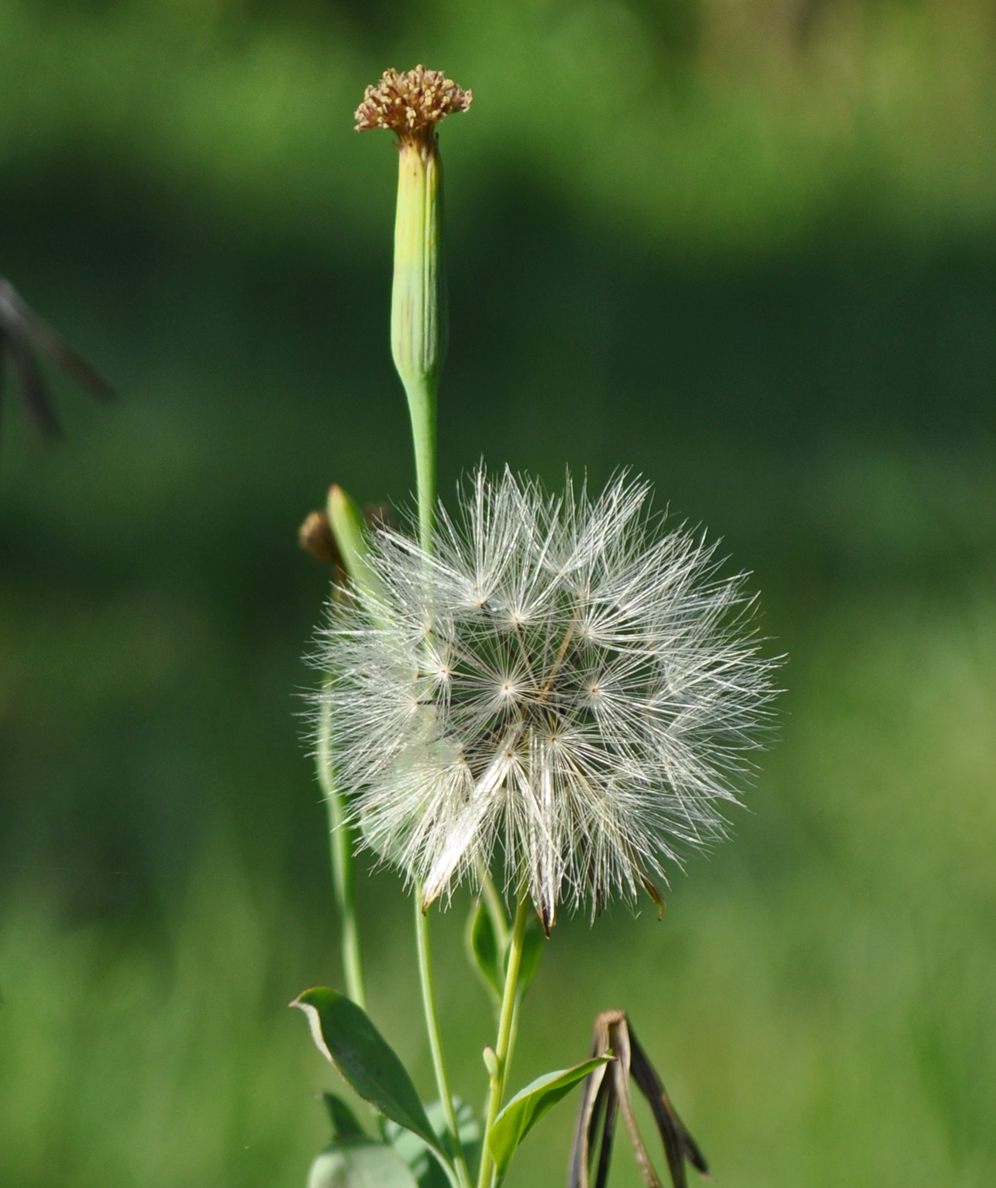
Seed head.

Having been used by many cultures, Porophyllum ruderale is known by many names. In English it has the names "Bolivian coriander" and "summer cilantro", despite not being botanically related to Coriandrum sativum, but it's more common to use a Spanish name. These include pápalo or pápaloquelite in Mexico; quillquiña, quirquiña, quilquiña or killi in Bolivia; rupay wachi in Peru; mampuritu in Curaçao; tepegua (more regionally in Mexico, e.g. Querétaro), and yerba porosa.

In Mexico the herb commonly accompanies tacos. Not all Mexicans enjoy its taste, but some find that it improves the flavor of tacos and typical Mexican salsas and soups. In Puebla cuisine, pápalo is used as a condiment on traditional cemita sandwiches, a regional type of Mexican torta.

In Bolivia it is typically used as an ingredient along with tomatoes and locotos to prepare llajwa.
