= Cholo =

Loosely-defined Spanish term that has had various meanings

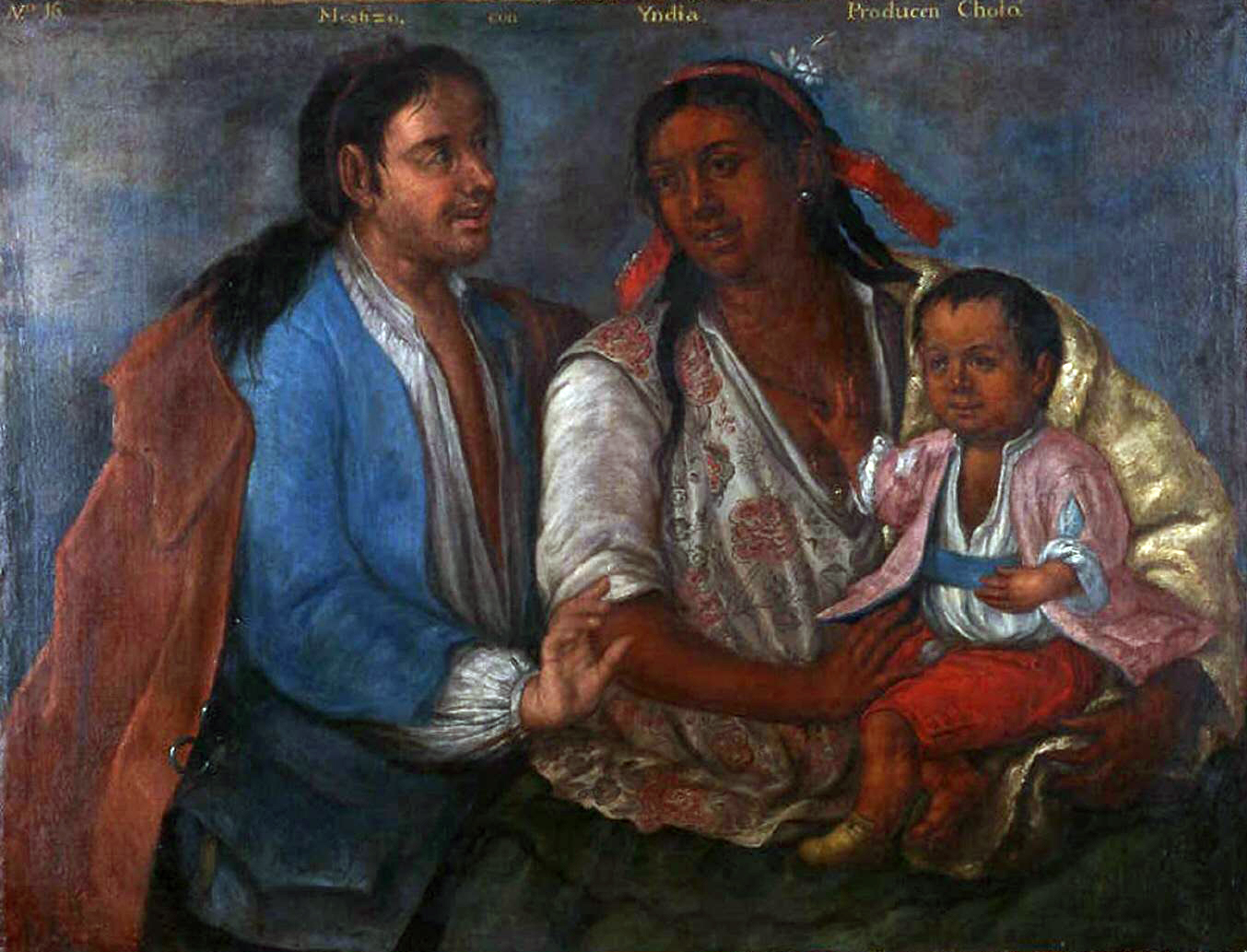
A mestizo and Indigenous parents' child was a cholo, traditionally. Casta painting from colonial Peru, 1770.

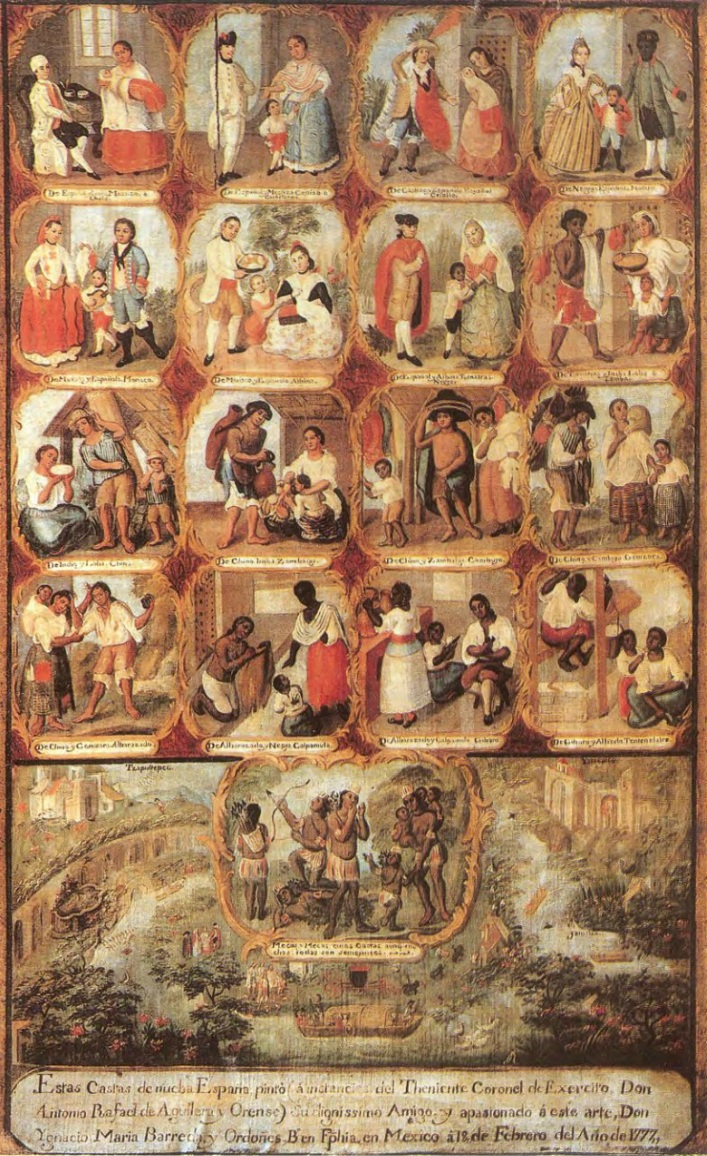
Casta painting showing 16 hierarchically arranged, mixed-race groupings. The top left grouping uses cholo as a synonym for mestizo. Ignacio Maria Barreda, 1777. Real Academia Española de la Lengua, Madrid.

Cholo (Spanish pronunciation: [ˈtʃolo]) was a racial category used in 18th-century Spanish America to refer to people who were three-quarters Amerindian by descent and one-quarter Spanish. Its origin is a somewhat derogatory term for people of mixed-blood heritage in the Spanish Empire in Latin America and its successor states as part of castas, the informal ranking of society by heritage. Cholo no longer necessarily refers only to ethnic heritage, and is not always meant negatively. Cholo can signify anything from its original sense as a person with one Indigenous parent and one mestizo parent, "gangster" in Mexico, an insult in some South American countries, or a "person who dresses in the manner of a certain subculture" in the United States as part of the cholo subculture.

== Historical usage ==
In his work Vocabulario en Lengua Castellana y Mexicana (1571), Fray Alonso de Molina reported that the word "cholo" or "xolo" derives from Nahuatl and means paje, moço, criado o esclavo (page, waiter, servant or slave).

The term's use to describe a caste is first recorded in a Peruvian book published in 1609 and 1616, the Comentarios Reales de los Incas by Inca Garcilaso de la Vega. He writes (in Spanish), "The child of a Black male and an Indian female, or of an Indian male and Black female, they call mulato and mulata. The children of these they call cholos. Cholo is a word from the Barlovento Islas [later known as Windward Islands]; it means "dog", not of the purebred variety, but of very disreputable origin; and the Spaniards use it for insult and vituperation". Interestingly, the Mexican hairless dog is known as "xoloitzcuintli" or "xolo" in Nahuatl.

In Ecuador, mestizas wearing Indigenous attire in Ecuador were termed cholas. "Chola appears to have been a designation largely reserved for women and which, according to Jacques Poloni-Simard, was used to indicate mestiza women who had achieved an incipient degree of hispanization that was beyond the grasp of men, who were more firmly bound to their native communities by tribute obligations."

In Imperial Mexico, the terms cholo and coyote co-existed, indicating mixed mestizo and Indigenous ancestry. Under the casta designations of colonial Mexico, the term rarely appears; however, an 18th-century casta painting by Ignacio María Barreda shows the grouping Español, India, with their offspring a mestizo or cholo

Cholo as an English-language term dates at least to 1851, when it was used by Herman Melville in his novel Moby-Dick, referring to a Spanish-speaking sailor, possibly derived from the Windward Islands reference mentioned above. Isela Alexsandra Garcia of the University of California at Berkeley writes that the term can be traced to Mexico, where in the early part of the last century, it referred to "culturally marginal" mestizos and Native American origin.

During the War of the Pacific (1879–1883), Peruvians were contemptuously referred to as "cholos" by Chilean officers.

An article in the Los Angeles Express of April 2, 1907, headlined "Cleaning Up the Filthy Cholo Courts Has Begun in Earnest", uses the terms "cholos" and "Mexicans" interchangeably. The term "cholo courts" was defined in The Journal of San Diego History as "sometimes little more than instant slums, as shanties were strewn almost randomly around city lots in order to create cheap horizontal tenements."

== Modern usage ==
=== United States ===
The terms cholos, cholas, and cholitas are used as informal slang terms in places like Southern California (typically by Latinos) to refer to people of Mexican, Salvadoran, Colombian, Dominican, Cuban, and others who have significant ancestry in the rest of Latinoamerica, who are usually of low income and are seen dressed in work wear such as flannels, bandanas, baggy khaki work pants, jewelry, and heavyweight shirts. This also usually refers to Latin Americans (and in some cases people who currently run operations in their country of origin) who are associated with Latino street gangs in the United States such as MS13, the Latin Kings, and the Sureños. While all Cholos are Latinos, they are more typically of Salvadoran and Mexican descent as the Cholo culture originated in Los Angeles, in which the expansive Latinoamerican population is mostly made up of Mexicans and a smaller number of Salvadorans. This influx of Mexicans and Salvadorans came due to the Salvadoran Civil War, which caused over 500,000 Salvadorans to immigrate to the United States and the Mexican Miracle, which caused Mexico's explosive economic growth, rapidly increasing Mexico's population. This led to a flood of Mexicans immigrating to the United States due to economic opportunities that were presented in places like Southern Texas, SoCal, Arizona, and New Mexico. Relatively quickly, gangs formed (such as MS13 in the 1980s), stemming from poor conditions of Los Angeles, causing already crime-riddled neighborhoods to contest their territory against gangs already in settled Los Angeles, such as the Bloods. This term is often regarded similarly to terms such as "thug" and "gangster" in Latinoamerican culture.

=== Bolivia ===
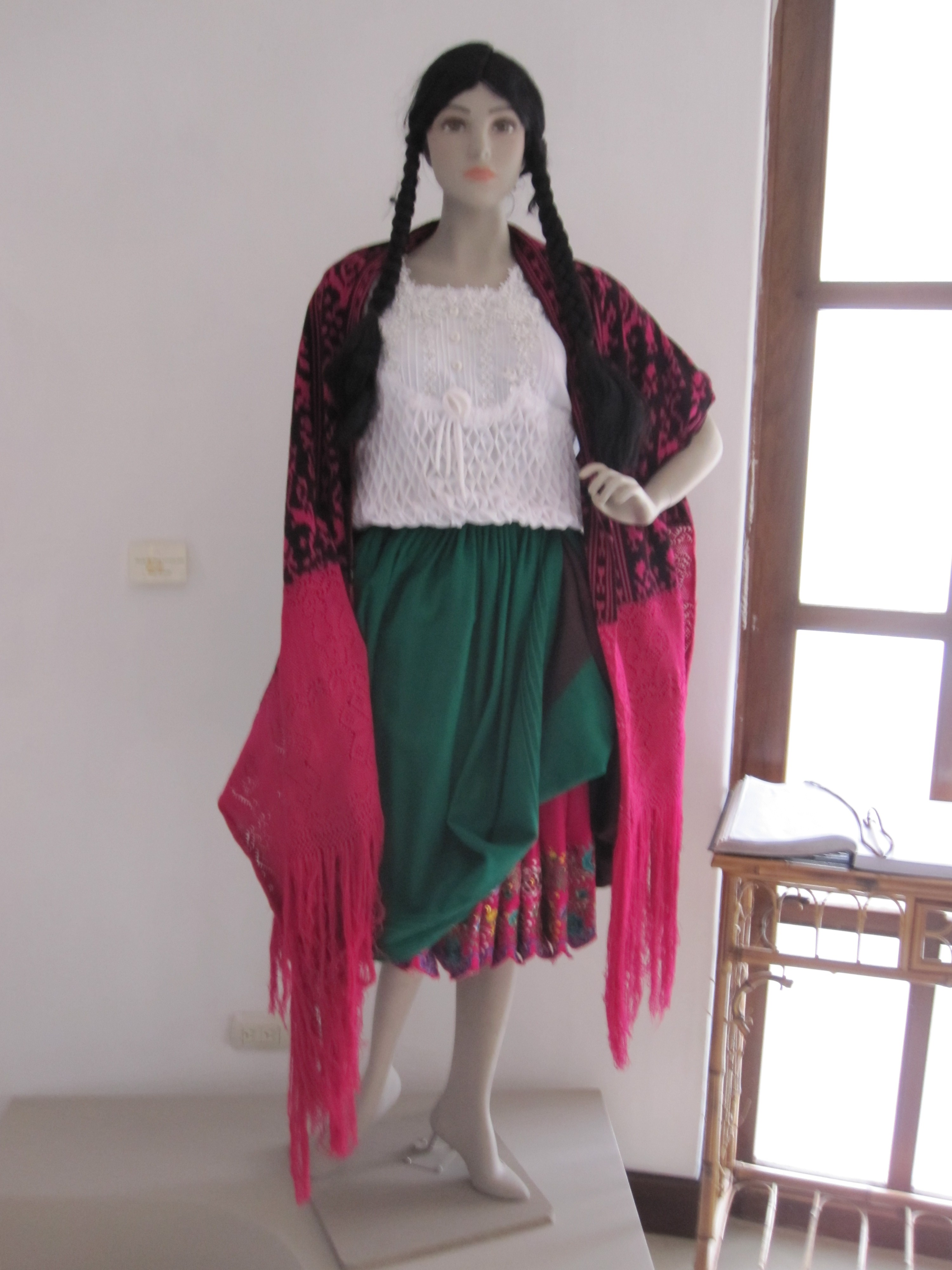
Typical dress of an Ecuadorian chola cuencana

In Bolivia, "cholo" refers to people with various degrees of Indigenous ancestry. The term "cholita" has, traditionally, been used to refer in a derogatory way to Aymara women. These women are now combatting this pejorative use by associating it with, for example, extreme sports such as wrestling, the fighting cholitas, and mountaineering, the cholita climbers. Cholitas, with their Indigenous costumes of bowler hats, shawls, and pollera are now seen as fashion icons. Cholitas are now moving into many other fields at a high level. A "cholo" in Bolivia is the name given to a campesino (peasant, farmer) who moved to the city, and though the term was also originally derogatory, it has now become more of a symbol of Indigenous power. The word "cholo/a" is considered a common and/or official enough term in Bolivia such that "cholo" has been included as its own ethnic group option in demographic surveys conducted in the country. In these same surveys, the term had on occasion been used interchangeably with the term "mestizo".

=== Ecuador ===
Cholos pescadores are a group of traditional fishermen along the coasts of Ecuador.

=== Peru ===
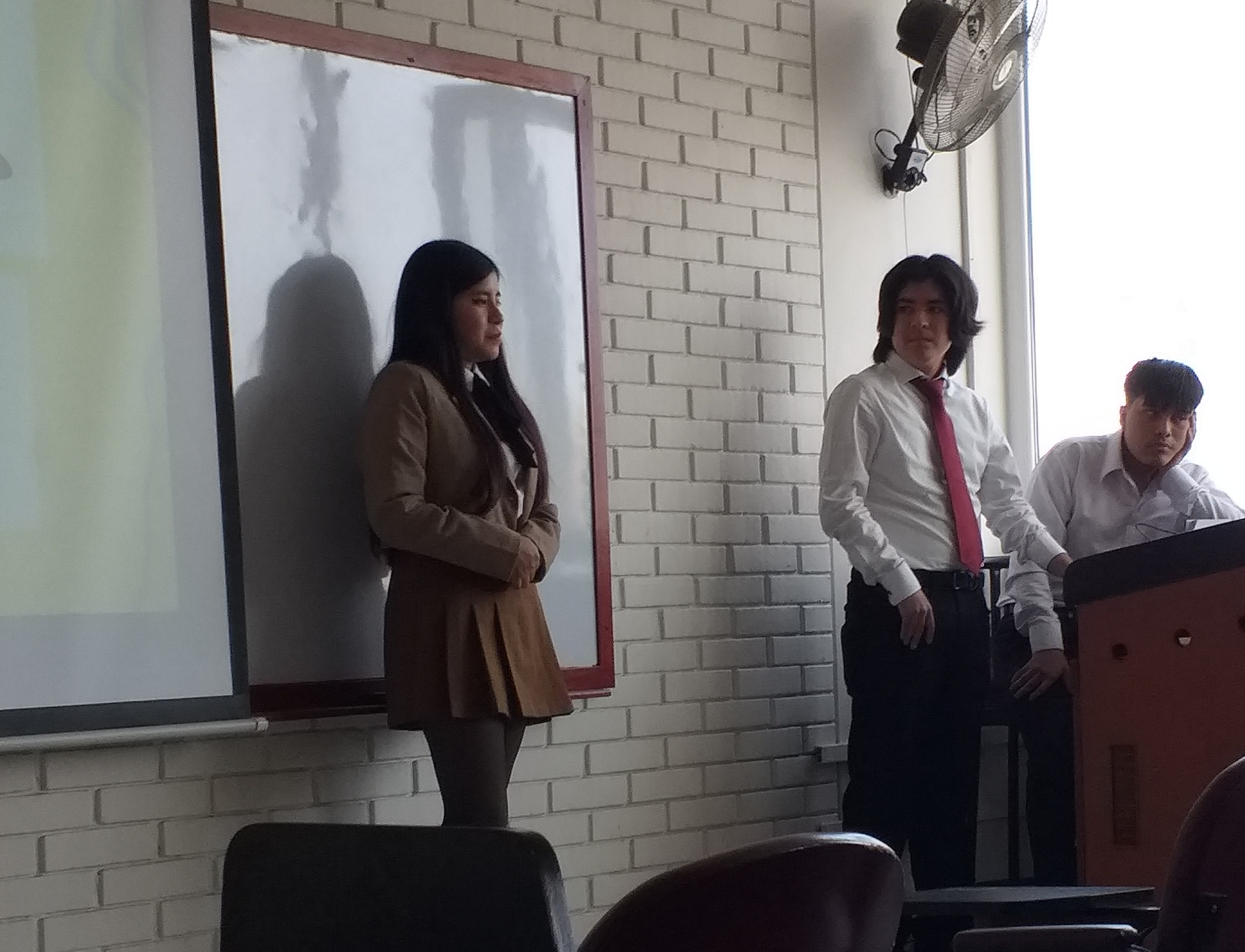
Peruvian cholos

In Peru, mestizos with greater Indigenous contributions are 27.7%: Those that would be in the range of 60% to 75% of Indigenous contributions, characterized by presenting a tonality of tan, brown, and brunette skin with major features of Indigenous ethnic groups. They are mostly descendants of Quechua peoples at around 23.7%; of other ethnic groups originating from the coast in 2%; of the Aymaras by 1.5%; of native ethnic groups of the jungle at 0.5%. Of the total of this subgroup around half are in the mountains, an important part of this segment due to migration are on the coast, usually in Lima, major urban centers and finally around a quarter (1/4) in the jungle. They are also called "cholos". The term has been used as a racial slur towards people of Indigenous origin. It has also been used as a cultural slur towards people of a lower social class or simply someone perceived to be crass, unsophisticated, or ignorant.

=== Mexico ===
The cholo gangs started from the US in the mid- to late 1920s. Cholo groups in Mexico were well established at least by the mid-1970s along the US-Mexico border, and in Central Mexico. These were called by various names, such as "barrios", "clickas", and "gangas". They were typically seen as American Hispanics and not as Mexicans because of their dress and appearance, which was not traditionally worn in Mexico. Many of these groups were formed by youths who had spent time in the United States and who returned with a different identity picked up in US street life. These groups mimic the organization of gangs in the United States, especially California, Texas, and Chicago. Cholos have their own style of dress and speech. They are known for hand signals, tattoos, and graffiti. Groups of cholos control various territories in the city. Most of the violence among these groups is over territory. Well-established Latino gangs from the United States (such as Norteños, Sureños, Latin Kings, 18th Street Gang, and MS-13) have made a strong presence in Mexico through making alliances with local drug cartels based on particular regions or cities.

== See also ==
- Aymara people
- Caboclo
- Chicano
- Chulo (disambiguation)
- Coyote (racial category)
- Mixed Race Day
- Naco (slang)
- Pachuco
- Zambo
