= Chulo =

Chulo may refer to:

- Majo, the male version of Maja in traditional Madrid
- Tsulosan or Chu-lô-san, former name of Chiayi, Taiwan
- "Chulo" (song), by Bad Gyal
