= Districts of La Paz =

Administrative divisions of La Paz, Bolivia

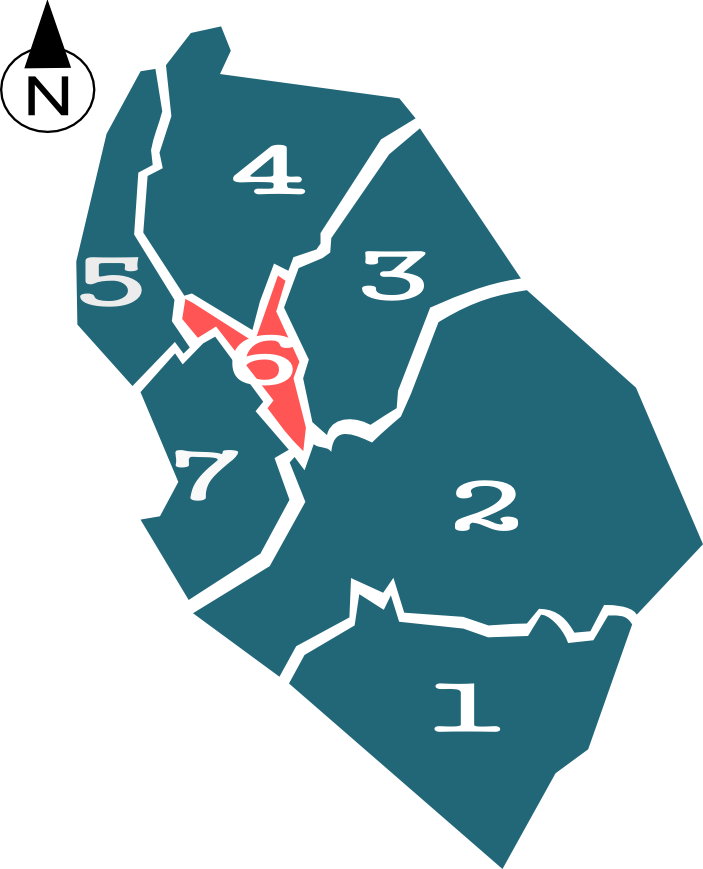
Districts of La Paz

The city of La Paz, Bolivia, is divided into seven main districts, called "Macro Distritos", which at the same time are divided into 21 small districts or zones. The city is commonly divided by the people into three main zones: South Zone, Central Zone and North Zone.

- 1st Main District: Mallasa: Amor de Dios, Aranjuez, Mallasilla, Isla Verde, Mallasa, Jupapina, Comunidad Chiaraque
- 2nd Main District: Distrito Sur (South District): Irpavi, Bolonia, Alto Irpavi, Koani, Achumani, Achumani-Meseta, Alto Achumani, Calacoto, Alto Calacoto, Cotacota, Chasquipampa, Ovejuyo, Obrajes, Alto Obrajes, Bajo LLojeta, Bella Vista, Alto Seguencoma, Bajo Seguencoma
- 3rd Main District: San Antonio: Villa de Copacabana, Villa Armonía, Villa San Antonio, Kupini, Callapa, Pampahasi, San Isidro
- 4th Main District: Periférica: Limanipata, Achachicala, Vino Tinto, 25 de Mayo, 5 Dedos, Santiago de Lacaya, Rosasani, La Merced, Chuquiaguillo
- 5th Main District: Max Paredes: Gran Poder, Obispo Indaburu, Villa Victoria, El Tejar, Alto Tejar, Chamoco Chico, Munaypata, Pura Pura, Ciudadela Ferroviaria
- 6th Main District: Distrito Centro (Central District): El Rosario, San Sebastián, Santa Bárbara, Casco Urbano Central, Parque Urbano Central, Miraflores, Casco Viejo
- 7th Main District: Cotahuma: San Jorge, Sopocachi, Alto Sopocachi (Sopocachi Highlands), Pasankeri, Tembladerani, Llojeta, Alpacoma, Belén, Tacagua, San Pedro, Alto San Pedro (San Pedro Highlands)

== Main neighborhoods and zones ==
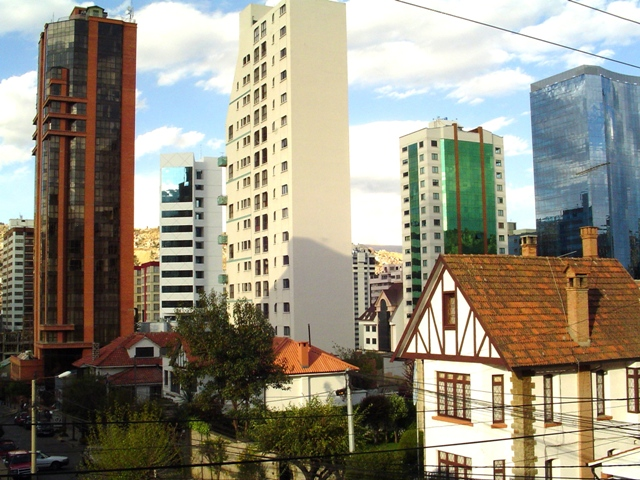
Buildings in San Jorge, on the 1st District (Cotahuma).

- San Jorge:, located on the 7th District (Cotahuma) and near Sopocachi, it is one of the main residential and diplomatic areas of the city. In contains several buildings, both residential and offices, and embassies, including the Spain Embassy, the United States Embassy, the United Kingdom Embassy and others. One of the main avenues of the city, Arce Avenue, starts on this zone.
- Sopocachi:, located on the 7th District (Cotahuma), Sopocachi is probably one of the oldest residential neighborhoods, located 10 minutes away from the center of the city. Despite the expansion and development of the area, this quarter maintained its residential property. In the last years, there has been an important commercial expansion, mainly on the surroundings of Abaroa Square, one of the many squares and parks of the zone.
- San Pedro:, located on the 7th District (Cotahuma), on the right bank of the Choqueyapu River and built around the "Plaza de San Pedro" (official name: Plaza Sucre, Sucre Square), is home to numerous shops, businesses and small enterprises, especially printing, spare parts and auto maintenance and repair shops. San Pedro's "Rodriguez Market" remains as one of the most middle-class popular and oldest of the city. The San Pedro prison is located here.
- Centro: (Downtown) is located on the 6th District and comprises the center of La Paz and principal avenues of the city, like Arce Avenue, July 16 Avenue (also known as "Prado Avenue"), Mariscal Santa Cruz Avenue and Camacho Avenue, this last one being the home of the headquarters of the principal banks and companies of the country.
- Casco Viejo:, located on the 6th District, is the historic and ancient center of La Paz. It now houses museums, hotels, shops and buildings as the Mayor City of La Paz and the Central Bank of Bolivia. In the Old Quarter is the Plaza Murillo, which is home to the Government Palace and the National Congress.
- Miraflores:, located on the 6th District, Miraflores district is separated from downtown by a long barrel (called Parque Urbano Central, Central Urban Park) and connected by the Bridge of the Americas and two avenues. Originally a residential zone, its growth has led it to become a major recreational center. It houses universities (including the Universidad Mayor de San Andrés's faculty of medicine), hospitals and the Estadio Hernando Siles(capacity of 45,000 people).
- Northern District:, located on the 4th and 5th districts, it has a significant industrial activity (mainly food), being the Cervecería Boliviana Nacional (Bolivian National Brewery) the most significant industry founded by Germans, and one of the city's biggest companies in the country. It connects La Paz with the city of El Alto by the "autopista"or Highway.
- Southern District:, located on the 2nd district has less height than the rest of La Paz (3,200 to 2,800 meters). This area houses the most affluent business and the richest neighborhoods of the city, like Calacoto, La Florida and Achumani, among others. It has benefited from steady economic growth and is now the second commercial and financial center of the city, housing international firms like Moody's, Citibank, Aon Corporation, Huawei, Millicom International Cellular, Pan American Silver Corporation, a Sumitomo Corporation branch, Ernst & Young, and the "MegaCenter", Bolivia's biggest shopping mall (52,000 m^{2} of construction).
