= Llajua =

Bolivian chili sauce

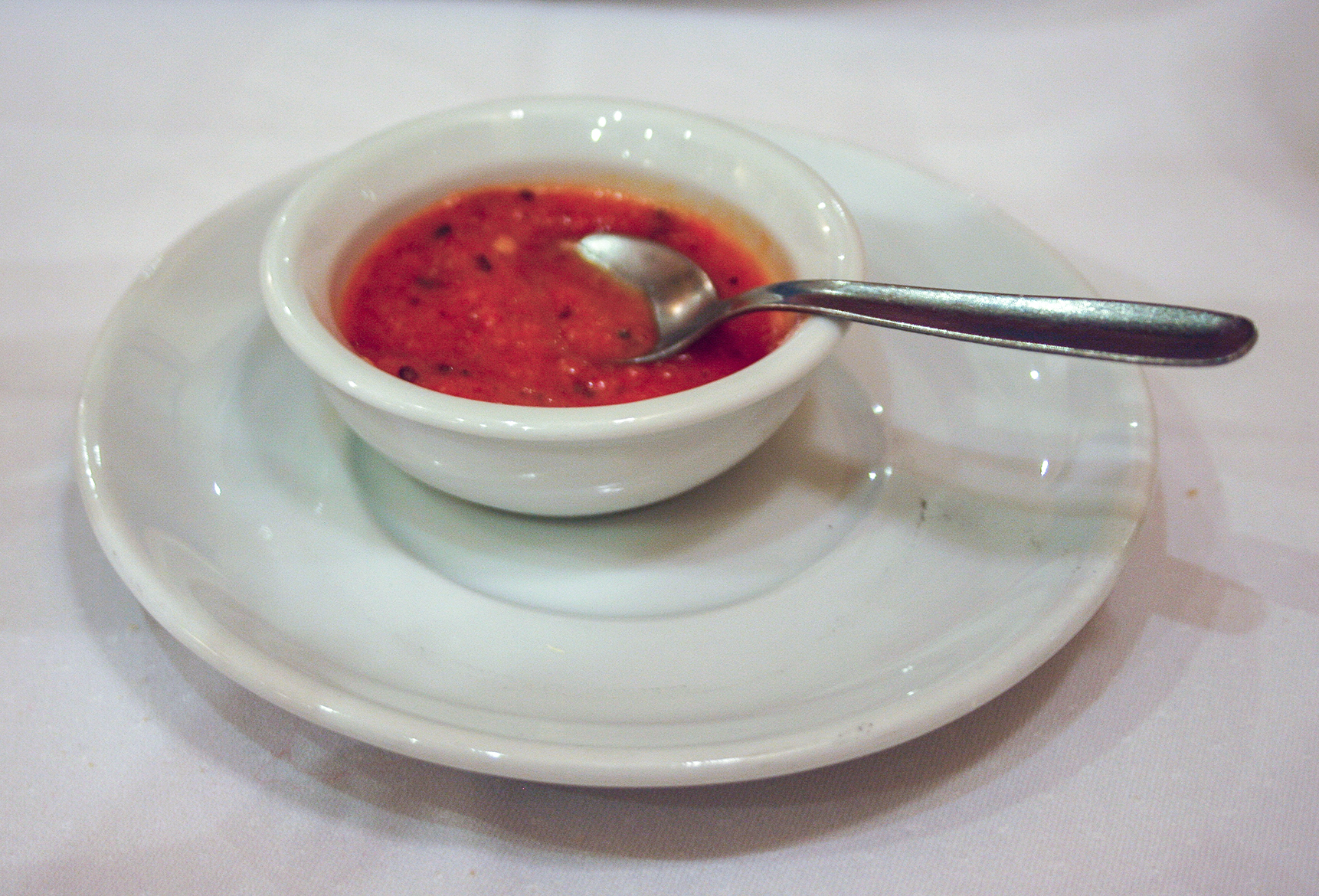
Llajwa

Llajua or llajwa (Spanish pronunciation: [ˈʎaxwa]) is a Bolivian chili sauce prepared from locotos (Capsicum pubescens) hot chili peppers and tomatoes; sometimes onions are added to the mix. One or two seasoning herbs could be added, depending on the region and taste: quillquiña (Bolivian coriander) in Cochabamba and wakataya in the Altiplano and other valleys of Bolivia. Llajua is also made and consumed in Northwest Argentina due to its close proximity to Bolivia. It is preferably prepared on a grinding stone called a batán, which can be found in most Bolivian households of Cochabamba and the Altiplano. In the absence of a batan, it can be prepared in a blender.

It is consumed all over Bolivia.

Llajua is used to season a wide variety of dishes. A traditional use is as a dip for plain cooked potatoes or bread, or an addition to soup prior to the main course. Food carts usually have it available for customers, and for take-away food it is dispensed in small hand-tied clear plastic bags.

The name "llajua", despite being the traditional name for this recipe, was accorded trademark protection in 2008 by the Bolivian government.

== See also ==
- Ají (sauce)
- List of dips
- List of sauces
