= Cholita Climbers =

South American mountaineering club

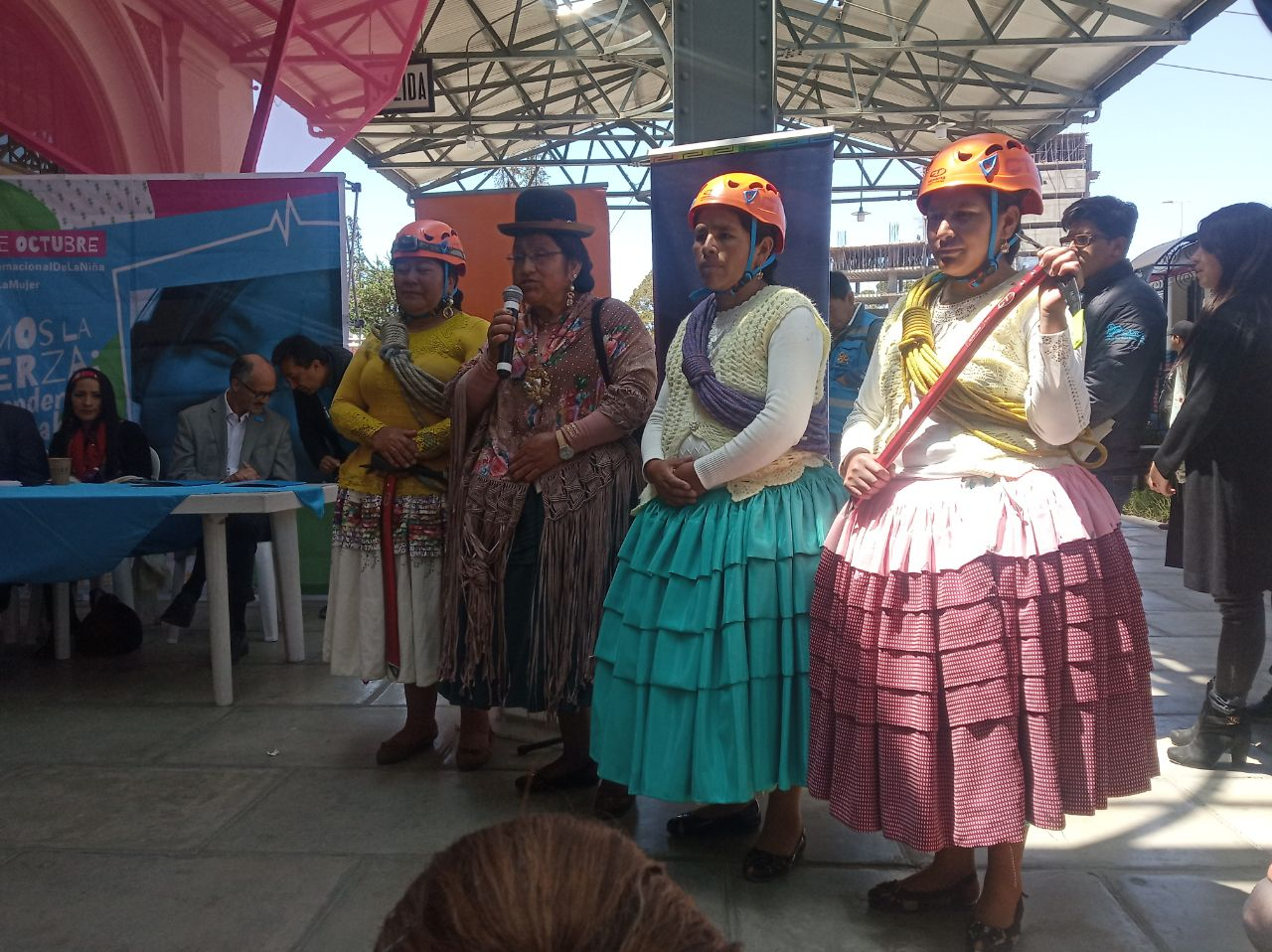

The Cholita Climbers of Bolivia, or Las Cholitas Escaladoras Bolivianas, are a group of pollera women - Indigenous, Aymara women - mountaineers who climb peaks in Latin America. They do not wear modern mountaineering clothing, preferring instead their traditional costumes including polleras, brightly colored, full, pleated skirts with many under skirts. They do wear helmets and boots and use crampons, ice picks and ropes but carry their equipment on their backs in traditional shawls. The group was founded in 2015 by local women including Cecilia Llusco Alaña. The women are part of a tight knit community who work and live in the mountains. Their most notable expedition was on January 23, 2019 when they became the first Aymara women to summit Aconcagua, the highest mountain in the Americas.

== History ==
The Cholita climbers live in the cities of La Paz and El Alto, and so are accustomed to high altitude conditions. The women range from 24 to 50 years old. Many of them have family or work connections to mountaineering. For example, Cecilia Llusco Alaña started helping her father, a trekking guide, at the age of eight. Others in the group have partners who are climbers or have themselves worked as porters or high mountain cooks on climbing expeditions. In 2015, eleven Cholitas Escaladoras, led by mountain cook Lidia Huayllas Estrada, made it to the summit of Huayna Potosí, a 6,088 meter high peak in Bolivia, in a single attempt. They then decided to climb mountains all over Latin America, despite the fact that it was judged by many to be inappropriate or impossible for women in their community to be mountaineers.

The word cholita has been used pejoratively to refer to Aymara women. They have also been ridiculed for wearing their traditional costumes and have been discriminated against in public spaces and in employment opportunities. To challenge these negative connotations, this group of mountaineers climb in their traditional attire. Other Cholitas, such as the fighting cholitas, and the skating cholitas, have excelled in other extreme sports and Aymara women in traditional dress are moving into other fields at high levels.

After Huayna Potosi, the group climbed Acotango, a mountain between Bolivia and Chile, Parinacota, Pomarapi, Illimani and Bolivia's highest mountain, Sajama de Oruro, all peaks higher than 6000 meters above sea level. Individuals in the group now accompany tourists on their climbs as regular guides. They have also now taken professional climbing and safety courses to become professional guides.

On January 23, 2019, they summited Aconcagua (6,968 meters) in Mendoza, Argentina. This was their highest summit at the time and their first international expedition. The climb was sponsored by the Ministry of Culture and Tourism of Bolivia and the expedition is now detailed in a documentary film called 'Cholitas' that premiered in Spain. In 2019, they started to run climbing courses for people who are just starting to climb. The Cholita Climbers would like to climb Mount Everest at some point and are training, raising money and looking for backers towards this goal.

== Notable people ==
The following members of the 16 strong group made the 2019 summit of Aconcagua in Argentina

- Lidia Huayllas Estrada (leader/ spokesperson)
- Estrada Dora Magueño Machaca
- Ana Lía Gonzales Magueño
- Cecilia Llusco Alaña
- Elena Quispe Tincuta
