= Pernil =

Slow-roasted marinated pork dish

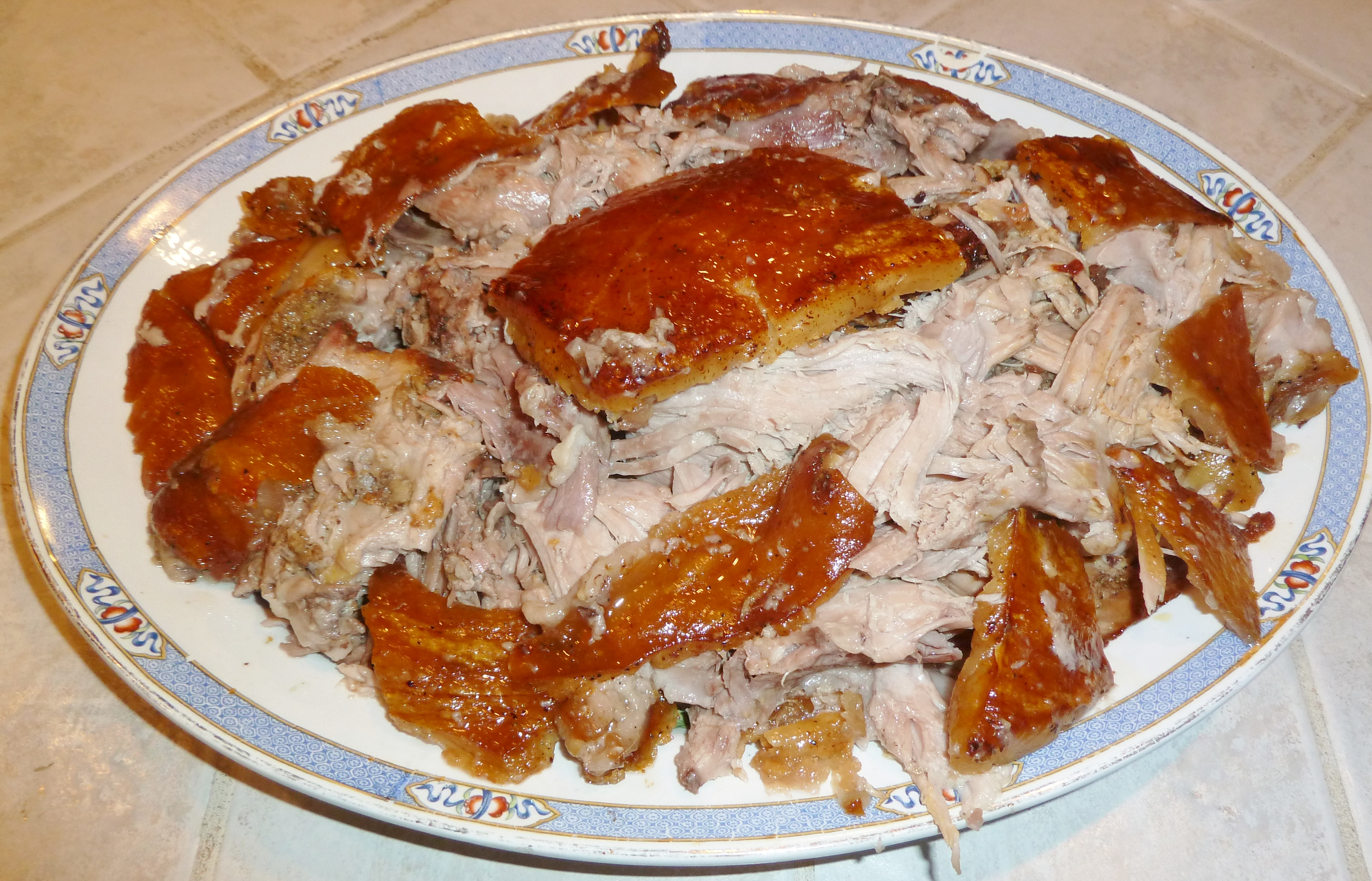
- Pernil ready to be served, with crisp skin chips (cueritos)
- Alternative names: Pernil asado
- Region or state: Puerto Rico, Colombia, Dominican Republic, Cuba, Venezuela and Ecuador
- Main ingredients: Pork leg or arm shoulder
- Ingredients generally used: Sofrito, salt, and pepper plus possibly additional spices (oregano, and adobo)

Pernil (pernil asado, pernil al horno, roast pork) is a slow-roasted marinated pork leg or pork shoulder common in Puerto Rico, Dominican Republic, Cuba, Colombia, Venezuela and Ecuador. Pernil is typically accompanied by rice and is commonly shared during Christmas.

The pork shoulder is used as a whole piece, with skin and bone. It is marinated the day prior to roasting with sofrito, salt and pepper, plus possibly additional spices (oregano and adobo). Sofrito is placed deep within the meat through small cuts. After marination the covered meat is slowly roasted initially in the oven for several hours, and, in the final phase, at a higher temperature with the cover off to get the skin crisp. When finished, the meat falls off the bone, and the crisp skin (cuero) is separated, cleared of fat, and can be served separately as cueritos (pork skin chips).

== See also ==
- Jokbal
- Griot (food)
