= Fighting Cholitas =

Group of female wrestlers who perform in Bolivia

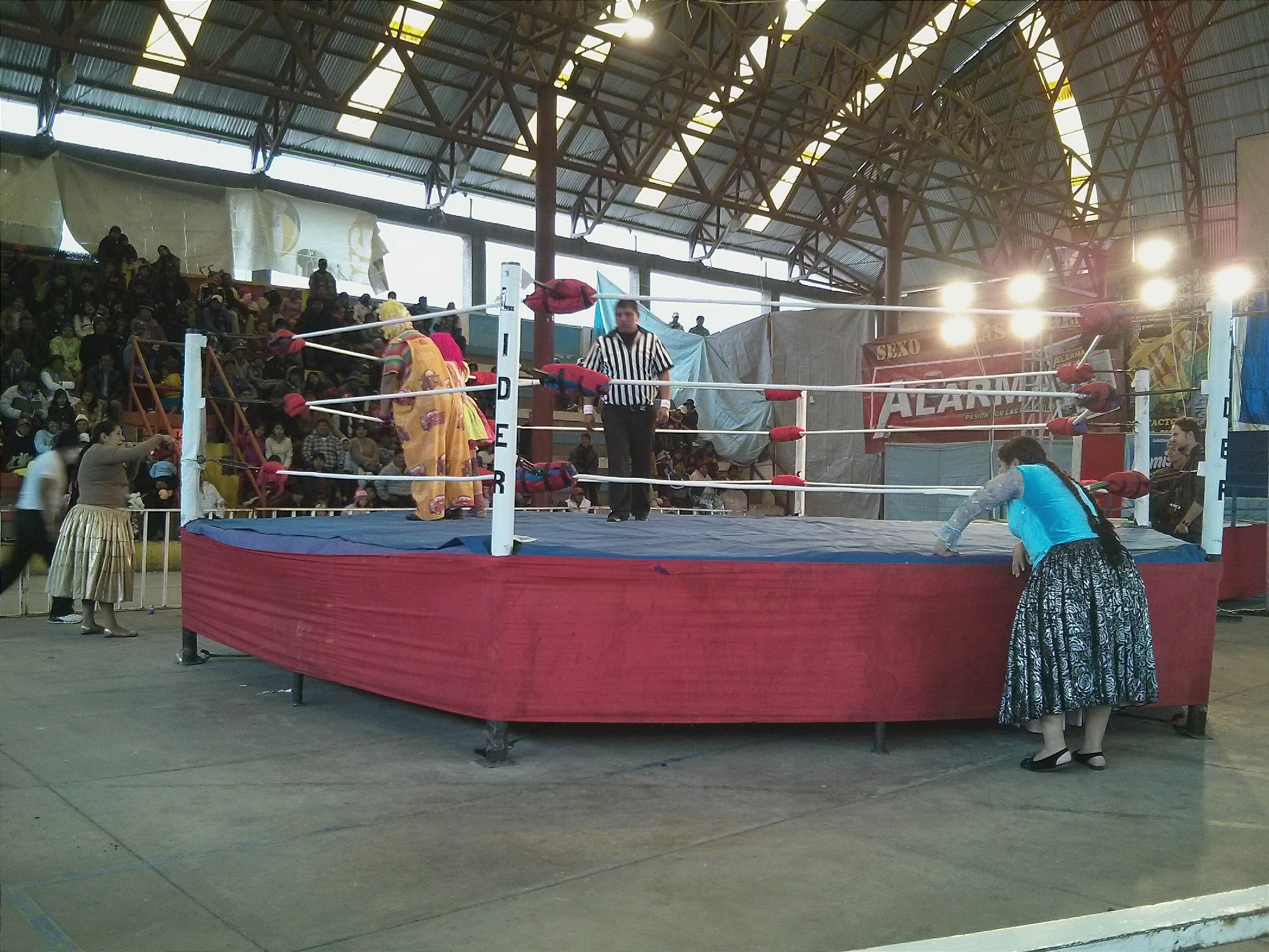
- Cholitas fight it out in the arena (February 2014)
- Directed by: Mariam Jobrani
- Produced by: Mariam Jobrani; Teresa Deskins; Kenny Krauss
- Release date: 2006
- Running time: 20 minutes
- Country: Bolivia

The Fighting Cholitas are a group of Indigenous Aymara women wrestlers who perform in El Alto, Bolivia. The Cholitas are part of a group called the Titans of the Ring, which includes both male and female wrestlers. The Titans perform each Sunday for an audience of hundreds at El Alto's Multifunctional Center. By 2005 tickets to the exhibitions cost $1.

The idea of including women wrestlers as a maneuver for publicity came from Juan Mamami, a wrestler and president of the Titans. They routinely attract over a thousand spectators to their bouts in El Alto and several hundred spectators when they travel with the Titans to smaller towns.

Like the general population of El Alto, which consists almost entirely of Aymara and Quechua residents, the Cholitas are Indigenous. They wear braided hair, bowler hats and polleras, multilayered skirts, in the ring.

According to a 2005 article in The New York Times, the Titans earn about $13 for each bout. Most of the wrestlers have other jobs besides their wrestling careers.

The Fighting Cholitas along with the Cholita Climbers and other groups of Indigenous Aymara women are pushing back against negative stereotypes.

== Media ==
The Cholitas were the subject of an award-winning 2006 short-subject documentary, The Fighting Cholitas. The twenty-minute documentary was directed by Mariam Jobrani and produced by Jobrani, Teresa Deskins and Kenny Krauss. The film received an honorable mention in Short Filmmaking at the 2007 Sundance Film Festival.

In October 2008, the Fighting Cholitas were featured in the third episode of thirteenth season of the American reality series The Amazing Race, in which a contestant from each team was tasked with learning and performing a six-step wrestling routine with a Cholita.
