= List of Bolivian women writers =

This is a list of women writers who were born in Bolivia or whose writings are closely associated with that country.

== A ==
- Diego Aramburo (born 1971), actress, director and playwright
- Beatriz Azurduy Palacios (1952–2003), film director, screenwriter, non-fiction writer

== B ==
- Yolanda Bedregal (1916–1999), poet, novelist
- Nadezhda Bravo Cladera (born 1944), linguist, writer, educator

== C ==
- Matilde Casazola (born 1942), poet, songwriter, awarded the Order of the Condor of the Andes
- Carola Cobo (1909–2003), writer, theater and radio artist
- María Guadalupe Cuenca (1790–1854), letter writer
- Silvia Rivera Cusicanqui (born 1949), Aymara feminist sociologist

== F ==
- Hercilia Fernández de Mujía (1860–1929), poet and writer

== G ==
- María Galindo (born 1964), activist, psychologist, screenwriter
- Teresa Gisbert (1926–2018), architect, art historian, educator, non-fiction writer

== J ==
- Dora Justiniano de la Rocha (1925–2016), Bolivian linguist, educator and poet

== M ==
- Rosa Julieta Montaño Salvatierra (born 1946), attorney, activist, non-fiction writer
- María Josefa Mujía (1812–1888), poet, Bolivia's first woman writer
- Hilda Mundy (1912–1980), writer, poet, journalist

== R ==
- Centa Rek (born 1954), novelist, psychoanalyst, politician
- Giovanna Rivero (born 1972), novelist and short story writer
- Ana María Romero de Campero (1941–2010), politician, journalist, non-fiction writer

== T ==
- Lola Taborga de Requena (1890–c.1950), modernist poet
- Gigia Talarico (born 1953), writer and poet
- Ana Rosa Tornero (1907–1984), journalist, editor, women's rights activist
- María Cristina Trigo (1935–2014), writer and human rights activist

== U ==
- Julia Urquidi (1926–2010), memoirist

== V ==
- Gaby Vallejo Canedo (1941–2024), novelist
- Etelvina Villanueva y Saavedra (1897–1969), educator, feminist, writer, poet

== W ==
- Blanca Wiethüchter (1947–2004), poet, short story writer, novelist, essayist

== Z ==
- Adela Zamudio (1854–1928), acclaimed poet, feminist, educator

== See also ==
- List of women writers
- List of Spanish-language authors
