= Luis Paz =

President of the Supreme Court of Justice of Bolivia (1919–1928)

Advocate Luis Paz
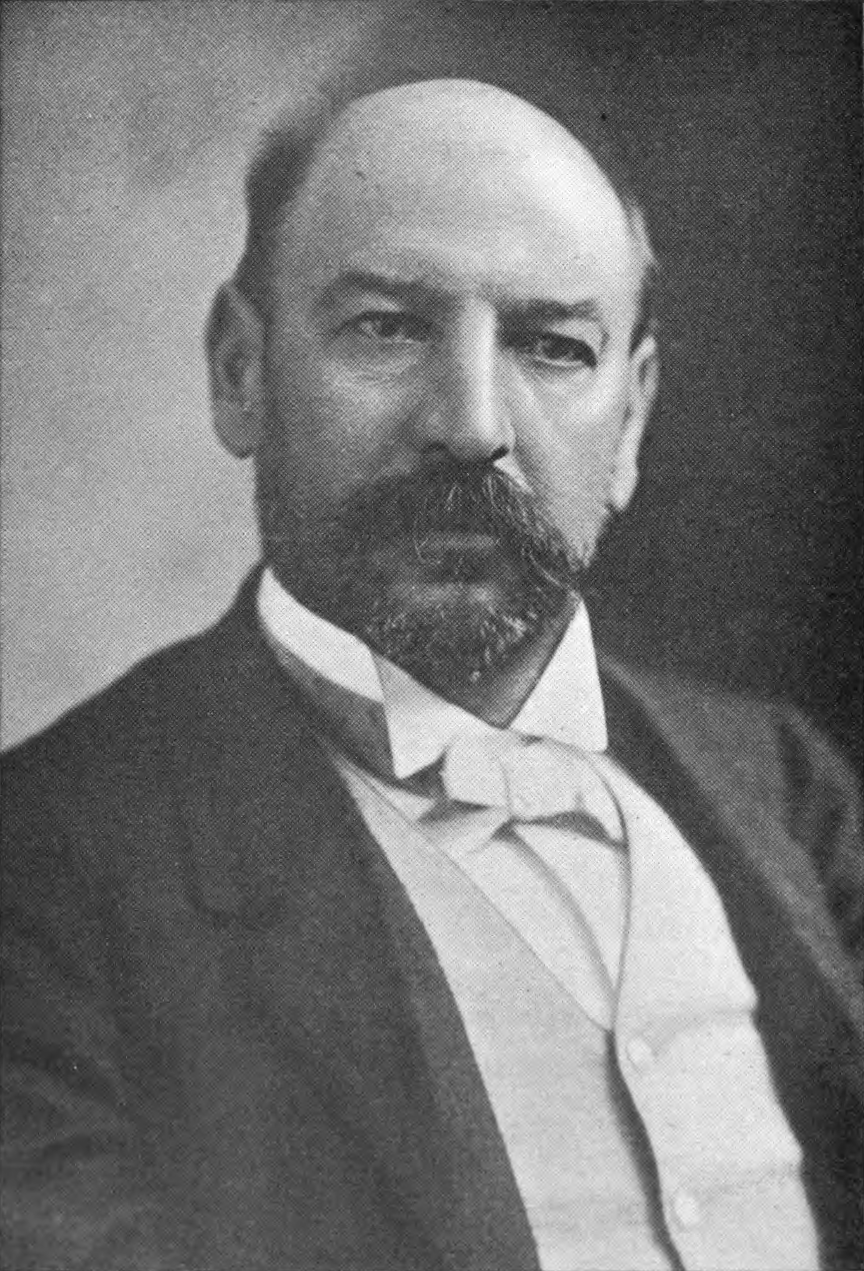

Vice President-elect of Bolivia
- Did not take office
- President: Bautista Saavedra
- Preceded by: Ismael Vázquez; José Santos Quinteros
- Succeeded by: Abdón Saavedra

Minister of War
- In office 22 May 1895 – 19 August 1896
- President: Mariano Baptista
- Preceded by: Severo Fernández
- Succeeded by: Jorge Oblitas

Minister of Government and Colonization
- In office 27 August 1892 – 22 May 1895
- President: Mariano Baptista
- Preceded by: Telmo Ichaso
- Succeeded by: Macedonio Doria Medina

Senator for Tarija
- In office 6 August 1892 – 6 August 1898
- Preceded by: Rosendo Estenssoro
- Succeeded by: Manuel de Argandoña

Personal details
- Born: Luis Paz Arce; 19 August 1854 Tarija, Bolivia
- Died: 6 October 1928 (aged 74) Sucre, Bolivia
- Party: Republican (1914–1928)
- Other political affiliations: Constitutional (before 1884); Conservative (1884–1914)
- Spouse: Mercedes Vásquez (m. 1879)
- Children: Seven
- Parent(s): Paulino Paz; Genoveva Arce
- Education: University of Saint Francis Xavier
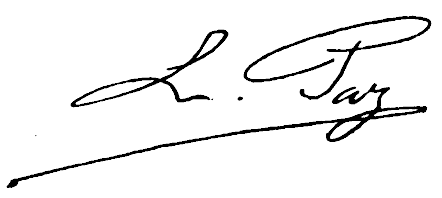
- Signature

Luis Paz Arce (19 August 1854 – 6 October 1928) was a Bolivian historian, journalist, jurist, lawyer, and politician who served on the Supreme Court of Justice of Bolivia for twenty-three years, an associate justice from 1905 to 1919 and as the president from 1919 until his death in 1928. A conservative, Paz held a lengthy political and academic background, serving in various legislative and ministerial positions from the early 1880s to the mid-1890s, including as minister of war from 1895 to 1896, minister of government from 1892 to 1895, and senator for Tarija from 1892 to 1898. In 1921, the National Convention selected him to be vice president under Bautista Saavedra, but he rejected the position, preferring to remain on the High Court.

== Early life ==
Luis Paz was born on 19 August 1854 in Tarija to Paulino Paz, an Argentine, and Genoveva Arce. On his father's side, he was a descendant of the Argentine general José María Paz. Paz attended the University of Saint Francis Xavier, where he studied law, graduating with the title of advocate on 22 October 1874. He married Mercedes Vásquez, with whom he had seven children. Paz began his career at the National School of Tarija, where he worked as a professor in the Faculty of Law and served as the chair of History and Literature. In 1881, he became the first chancellor of the institution. In addition, he worked as a journalist for the newspapers La Industria of La Paz as well as El Cruzado and La Capital in Sucre. Later, he founded the publications El Pueblo and El Trabajo in his home city of Tarija.

== Political and judicial career ==
=== Tarija politics ===
Entering politics at a young age, Paz worked in the municipal affairs of Tarija, being elected to the Municipal Council numerous times until becoming president of the body. His tenure was marked by the organization of municipal administration, which until then had been run poorly; affairs of public instruction, sanitation, and hygiene were reorganized during his term. After that, in 1875, the government of Tomás Frías successively appointed him to the functions of examining magistrate and fiscal agent of Tarija.

Around this time, influenced by the oratory personality of Mariano Baptista, Paz joined the ranks of the Red Party, the basis of what later became the Constitutional Party, founding the weekly El Pueblo in support of it. In one article, he heavily denounced the general Hilarión Daza, an action that, when Daza came to power in 1876, resulted in his arrest and the closure of his publication. During his confinement, he was tortured for sixty days, only being released at the request of Amalia Arce de Argandoña, whom Daza held in high regard. After his release, at the behest of his father, Paz fled to the port of Antofagasta, where he stayed for some months.

Upon returning to Tarija, Paz founded the newspaper El Trabajo, which continued circulation for forty years. In 1877, he returned to the field of education when he was appointed professor of philosophy and history at the San Luis National School. In 1878 and 1879, he held chairs of Criminal Law, Constitutional Law, and Administrative Law in the first and fourth courses of the Faculty of Law. In 1886, between terms in the National Congress, President Gregorio Pacheco appointed him to be the first chancellor of the Juan Misael Saracho University in Tarija.

=== Congressman and minister ===
As a Constitutional —later Conservative— Party member, he served as the private secretary to President Aniceto Arce, who later appointed him prefect of Tarija until 1892. In 1881, he was elected to represent Tarija in the Chamber of Deputies, and in 1892 he was elected to serve in the Senate. On 27 August 1892, he was appointed minister of government by President Mariano Baptista, later reassigned as minister of war on 22 May 1895. From 1897 to 1899, Paz was called to various diplomatic posts, serving as the Bolivian minister plenipotentiary to the United States and France as well as the Holy See. Due to his service in these various ministerial and diplomatic posts, he only had the opportunity to attend the 1896 legislature during his senatorial term.

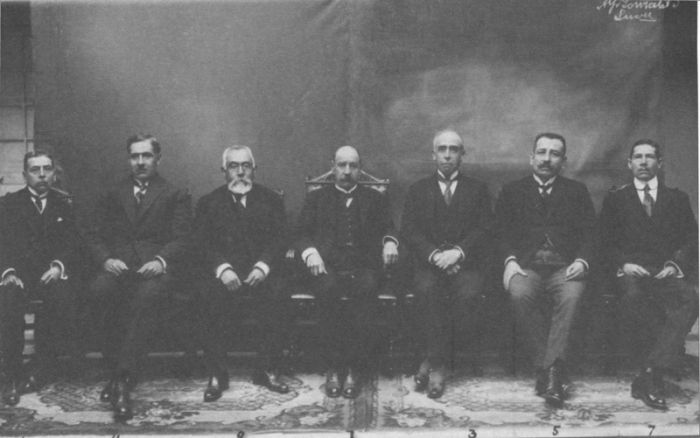
Paz (center) as President of the Supreme Court of Justice, c. 1920.

=== Supreme Court (1905–1928) ===
During this time, he continued to practice law, an endeavor which in 1883 led him to become the district attorney and a member of the Departmental Court of Tarija. After the triumph of the liberals in the Federal War, Paz returned to professional life. Though the administration of Ismael Montes and Eliodoro Villazón offered him diplomatic posts in Paraguay and Argentina, he rejected them due to political differences between himself and the Liberal Party government. From 1905, he served as an associate justice of the Supreme Court of Bolivia, later rising to the presidency of the High Court in 1919. During his tenure, he attended the founding of the Republican Party, which in 1920 took power in a coup d'état.

On 2 February 1921, the National Convention elected Paz vice president of the republic. However, preferring to remain on the court and alleging that he had not been consulted to run, Paz resigned on 29 March, having never been sworn in to office. He remained president of the Supreme Court until his death on 6 October 1928.

== Publications ==
- Paz, Luis (1908). Biografía de don Mariano Baptista: cuadros históricos y parlamentarios de Bolivia (in Spanish). Casa Jacobo Peuser.
- ———— (1908). Estudios historicos de Monsenor Miguel de los Santos Taborga: capitulos de la historia de Bolivia (in Spanish). M. Pizarro.
- ———— (1914). La Universidad Mayor Real y Pontificia de San Francisco Xavier de la capital de los Charcas: apuntes para su historia (in Spanish). Impr. Bolívar.
- ———— (1919). Historia general del Alto Perú, hoy Bolivia (in Spanish). Vol. 2. Impr. Bolívar.
- ———— (1927). Primer Centenario de la Corte Suprema de Justicia (in Spanish). Escuela Tip. Salesiana.

Senate of Bolivia
Preceded by Rosendo Estenssoro	Senator for Tarija; 1892–1898	Succeeded by Manuel de Argandoña
Political offices
Preceded by Telmo Ichaso	Minister of Government and Colonization; 1892–1895	Succeeded by Macedonio Doria Medina
Preceded by Severo Fernández	Minister of War; 1895–1896	Succeeded by Jorge Oblitas
