= Etelvina Villanueva y Saavedra =

Bolivian educator, organizer, and writer (1897–1969)

Etelvina Villanueva y Saavedra (1897–1969) was a Bolivian educator, feminist organizer, writer, and poet.

In 1923, María Luisa Sánchez Bustamante organized the first feminist group in Bolivia, Ateneo Femenino, with the goals of attaining civil and political equality as well as furthering their artistic growth. Charter members were artists, journalists, teachers and writers and included Leticia Antezana, Elvira Benguria, Fidelia Corral, Marina Lijerón, Julia Reyes Ortiz, Ema Alina Palfray, Emma Pérez de Carvajal, María Josefa Saavedra, Ana Rosa Tornero, Ana Rosa Vásquez, and Etelvina Villanueva. They organized their own journal Eco Femenino. From its inception, Tornero ran the magazine printing literary submissions and articles on feminism.

In the 1930s, Villanueva y Saavedra founded another important feminist group, Legión Femenina de Educación Popular de America (Feminine Legion for American Popular Education). This group sought to improve the status of women, regardless of social class, by advocating for changes in the legal code. They provided assistance to the poor and defended unwed mothers and children. They were able to do this because they argued that they were “natural” mothers and so this was a form of mothering but on a higher level and with a new term, "social mothering." In addition to this, the organization allowed Bolivian women to enter the international feminist debates.
