= Armando de Urioste =

Bolivian industrialist and business magnate

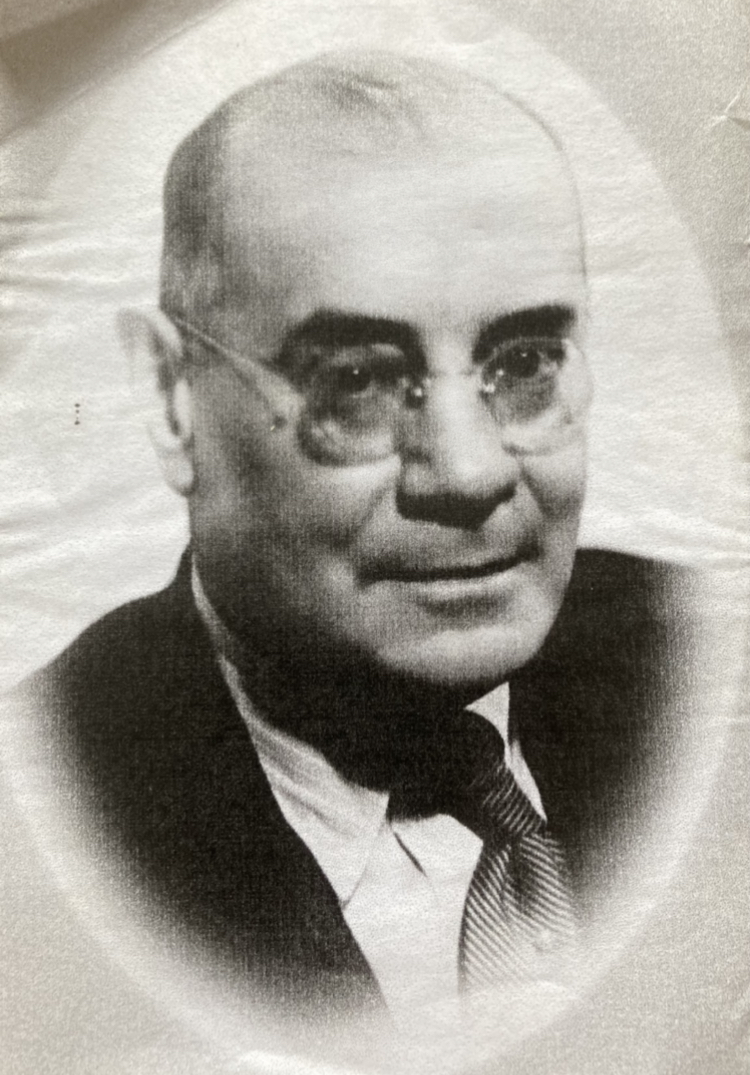
- Born: Armando Julio Urioste Arana; 10 October 1887; Sucre, Bolivia
- Died: 6 November 1951 (aged 64); La Paz, Bolivia
- Resting place: General Cemetery of La Paz
- Occupation: Industrialist
- Spouse: María Luisa Sánchez Bustamante de Urioste
- Children: 2

Armando Julio de Urioste Arana (10 October 1887 – 6 November 1951) was a Bolivian industrialist and magnate who, at the time of his death, was one of the wealthiest men in the city of La Paz. He was born into one of the elite families of Bolivia, being the relative of several Bolivian presidents including José Miguel de Velasco, Tomás Frías, and Mariano Enrique Calvo. He was also husband to one of the country's most famed feminists, María Luisa Sánchez Bustamante de Urioste and son to Atanasio de Urioste Velasco, a distinguished diplomat and politician.

== Early life and family ==
He was born in the capital city of Bolivia, Sucre, to one of the country's elite families. His parents were Atanasio de Urioste Velasco and Adela Arana Costas. His paternal great-grandfather, Don Atanasio de Urioste de las Carreras, was a wealthy merchant that established the Urioste family as one of the most prominent in the city of Sucre.

== Business activities ==
Although his family was well accommodated in Sucre, he decided to move to La Paz in the year 1910. By this time, La Paz was already replacing Sucre as the center of the country. Especially after the Federal War of 1899, La Paz had rapidly become the most important city.

With the industrial revolution spreading throughout the world, Bolivia, like most of Latin America, had now taken the initiative to start building its industrial complex. He was a big part of this as he became the owner of the country's first cement factory. This made him a pioneer of industrialism in La Paz and soon he became one of the wealthiest men in the city.

He founded the first construction company in La Paz. As such, he came to occupy an important role in the city's industrial and urban development. Furthermore, he held the title of president of the La Paz Club and of the Círculo de La Unión, an organization which boasted only the most elite members of society at the time.

== Personal life ==
He was married to one of Bolivia's most famed feminists, María Luisa Sánchez Bustamante. She was one of the most important activists in leading to women's suffrage and a daughter of a prominent politician, Daniel Sánchez Bustamante. The marriage produced two children, Marcelo and Armando.
