= Gender inequality in Bolivia =

General statistics
- Maternal mortality (per 100,000): 190 (2010)
- Women in parliament: 53%(2015)
- Women over 25 with secondary education: 39.8% (2010)
- Women in labour force: 64.1% (2011)

Gender Inequality Index
- Value: 0.418 (2021)
- Rank: 117th out of 191

Global Gender Gap Index
- Value: 0.747 (2025)
- Rank: 48th out of 148

Women in Bolivia face significant challenges and discrimination despite the Constitution of Bolivia guaranteeing equal rights for woman. According to the Human Development Report published by the Office of the United Nations Development Programme, in Bolivia "men receive more and better education than women, receive increased and better health assistance than women, and have the possibility to generate greater income while working less...if we consider that women, as opposed to men, also have...the almost exclusive responsibility for domestic work". According to a study by the Pan American Health Organization conducted in twelve Latin American countries, Bolivia has the highest prevalence of domestic violence against women among these countries. Bolivian women are also exposed to excessive machismo, being utilized as promotional tools in popular advertising which solidifies stereotypes and assumptions about women.

Maternal mortality and illiteracy among women are some of the highest rates in the world. Since men are generally more educated than women, especially among the indigenous population, the high illiteracy rate make it difficult for women to learn the dominant language Spanish which disables them to participate in the labor market. In the informal economy, Bolivia has about 65 percent of international migration workers, which is one of the highest in Latin America. There is limited access to healthcare. In 1992–1993, the annual rates of mortality of children aged less than 5 years, were 205.5 per 1,000 and 98.5 per 1,000.

== History ==
In the 19th century, the 1830 civil code of Bolivia oversaw women's rights in the country. Under the code, women had to practice obedience to their husbands. Women had no rights or legal protection against domestic abuse.

Bolivian law began to change in the early 20th century due to pressure by upper class women who started the women's movement with the foundation of the Ateneo Femenino by María Luisa Sánchez Bustamante in 1923. These women found inspiration in the work of feminist writer Adela Zamudio. The General Labor Act of 1939 gave women protection regarding labor relations. A constitutional amendment in 1949 stated that men and women were equal. Women earned the right to vote in 1952 as part of the Bolivian Social Revolution. The Bolivian Constitution of 1967 declared that women and men were equal in regards to the law. The Civil Code of 1976 gave women some rights in the family code. That code also gave all Bolivians personal liberty.

Today, the Bolivian government acknowledges that laws protecting women are not enough. Poor publicizing of the laws is credited with this problem, causing lawyers to not use the laws in court. Furthermore, officials, often male, may choose not to enforce laws. Local and regional governments also lack the resources to implement the laws. Illiteracy of Bolivian women is also a possible cause, as women are unable to educate themselves about the laws that protect them.

== Political Involvement ==
Women's participation in Bolivian politics has increased by 16 percent as of 1992. Despite growth, indigenous women continue to lack influence in the political system. While Bolivian president Evo Morales has supported reforms regarding opportunities for indigenous peoples to hold office, opportunities for women have been lacking due to poor education and leadership for women. There have been successful outcomes regarding women's political involvement. In 2010, a national conference for indigenous women parliamentarians was held with almost 100 participants. During the election of 2009, the number of women elected to parliamentary positions rose from 14 percent to 28 percent. In 2010, half of Morales' political cabinet consists of women. Morales stated that he had dreamt of the opportunity to have half the cabinet members be women, and called a "homage," to the women in his family. As of 2010, 30 percent of the legislative branch seats were held by women. That same year, Ana Marie Romero became the first woman to preside over the country's Senate. Before Romero, Lidia Gueiler Tejada presided over the lower Bolivian house and from 1978 until 1980 she was the country's interim president. In 1997, the Reform and Complementary Law to the Electoral Regime was passed, requiring that all political parties have at least 25 percent female candidates for the senate, and a third for other political offices.

Since the empowerment of women in government in Bolivia, more than 200 organizations that fall under the umbrella of the Coordinadora de la Mujer have been started. These organizations are involved in policy change and law making. On election ballots, female and male names must be alternated in order. An attempt was made by Elizabeth Salguero, who chaired the Commission on Human Rights, to pass a law protecting women from political violence based on gender, but the law was not passed.

=== Participation in development ===
Adela Zamudio(AZ) is known as a group of women that seeks to empower and educate indigenous women about structure in community development work among men and women, and also to let them know how to be involved in that. The purpose of AZ was to have indigenous women to participate more in development work in a political manner. It has small effects to the rural community because of the conception of the women's gender role as a wife to their husbands, how they participate in development work, and they don't take the opportunity to earn income. For them, it would steal the opportunity away from their husbands.

In 2005, two middle-class women from Bolivia that co-founded AZ they tried to establish an empowerment training class. Empowerment training, is used under the term of gender politics, which means it is only for women. A project was created for women to have an economic opportunity to help them earn income, and advance in economic development. They were given the option to create a stone pathway and would be paid for their work. If this project is what the women wanted to do, then the two middle-class women would bring the project proposal to the mayor's office in order to start the project. However, the women did not like this idea, because they thought their opportunity would take away from their husband's opportunity to earn money. Another reason was that there was another responsibility placed on the women besides taking care of their families. The women asked for the proposal to include men because they thought that because as husbands they were companions in development, not contestants. Their identity as a partner and a wife to their husbands is intertwined with progress of economic development. In the end, the women in charge proposed to analyze the differences in power between men and women, among the poor and middle class.

Many Bolivian women have a different perception on the AZ and its purpose when it comes to economic opportunity and community development. The women's perception is to have men get local jobs so there would be no need for them to travel a far distance to their job. This idea was presented by the local government. The project proposal was to help the women improve themselves and their community. The women wanted to give men the opportunity also, instead of creating competition between the two genders. In another part of Bolivia, there are a group of indigenous women activists that do participate politically and want to decolonize.

An indigenous group, the Aymaras believe in the term Chachawarmi, which means to have men and women be represented equally. It is a traditional concept among majority of the Aymara people who live in the Andes of Bolivia. A study in 2009 focused mostly on Aymara activists living in the outskirts of La Paz analyzes in how they associate traditional customs, state politics and native activism. They believe that women and men are different, and therefore they have different responsibilities within the Chachawarmi system. They also believe that men and women complement each other with their roles and responsibilities. Within the Aymara community some indigenous women activists believe Chachawarmi should be used to decolonize and some believe it should be used for the community to stay the same.

Aymara people of Bolivia are advocates for their cultural customs and socio-political equality, and also the equality between men and women within their community. However, many middle-class feminists don't agree with the Chachawarmi tradition. The feminists convey the idea that Chachawarmi system undermines the Aymara women's participation because they do not engage much in the discussions or community meetings. It is normal for women not to talk because men perceive them as not educated because they don't speak Spanish, or it could be a result of women trying to resist against men's leadership. It is difficult for them to find solutions to find equality within the Chachawarmi system.

Some of the Aymara community stated they do not want to trade in or be decolonized from their traditional customs if they agree to live in accordance to the political laws and policies. Another reason for not wanting to be decolonized is because the Chachawarmi has been around since their community was established, and their way of living has remained the same.

There is no direct solution to this debate between gender politics and decolonization of the Aymaran people of Bolivia, but the analysis of understanding the different opinions of it is evaluated.

== Education ==
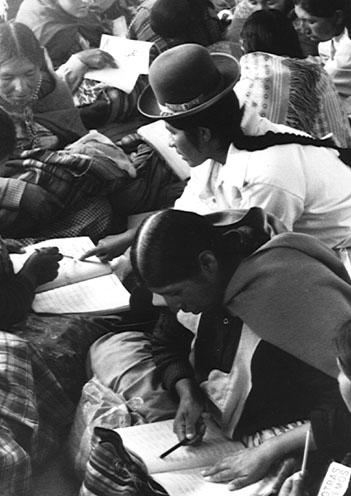
Women attending an adult literacy class in the El Alto section of La Paz, Bolivia

A 2001 report by the National Institute of Statistics of Bolivia reported that Bolivian women are more illiterate than men, with rates being 19.35 percent versus 6.94 percent, respectively. Women living in rural areas have even higher rates of illiteracy, at 37.91 percent versus men at 14.42 percent. Overall, women in Bolivia have the lowest rates in the continents region and is 20 percent under the Latin American average. The Law on Education Reform was passed in 1994 which promoted universal free educational opportunities for citizens regardless of gender. A focus was put on bilingual education for girls, which is credited with helping to lower the dropout rate. The majority of educational opportunities are performed in Spanish, while over 27 percent of Bolivian women don't speak Spanish, making access to education through their native language a barrier.

Low government support regarding education in rural areas, poor teaching training, educational programming and conflicts with the agricultural calendar all contribute to the education of girls living in rural areas. Bolivian women's school attendance rate is one of the lowest in South America. Less women attend school in rural areas, with only 64.6 percent attending. Girls in rural areas generally attend school up until the 3rd grade due to the demand of household work and helping to take care of younger siblings. Overall, 61 percent of women in Bolivia attend school as of 1998, a percentage lower than Chile (71 percent), Colombia (72 percent), and Peru (77 percent). Girls who are pregnant might be expelled from school.

== Economic participation ==
Gender stereotypes are still a standard in regards to women's roles and decisions in and outside the home. Women handle household chores, and it is estimated that 1 in 5 men make all decisions about purchases made for the household. The main women's trade union organization is the Bartolina Sisa Confederation. The Bolivian National Federation of Self-Employed Women Workers was formed to represent women who are self-employed in informal employment such as street vendors, which is common areas of employment for indigenous women.

=== Workforce participation and finances ===
Women's participation in economic development increased from 22.5 percent to 40 percent between 1976 and 2002. As of 2002, 44 percent of women worked. Women living in urban areas tend to have the least paying and unproductive types of jobs, which is believed to be due to the lack of educational opportunities for women and educational requirements for better jobs. In rural areas women struggle more due to their gender and of being indigenous. As of 1992 rural working women had risen from 18.3 percent in 1976 to 38.1 percent, but working conditions are often poor, wages low and have low productivity. Some employers require women to sign agreements not to get pregnant. Indigenous women tend to work long hours as street vendors or domestic worker. Women who work the latter tend to work more hours, with less days off and low pay.

Despite growths in workforce participation, women's income capacity has changed very little. Increased distribution of wealth for women since 1990 until 2003 grew only by 3 percent. As of 2001, women's wages were only 75 percent of men's wages. Professional women make even less, at only 69 percent. It is more difficult for a woman to obtain a bank loan, than it is for men, due to the fact that most women will be unable to repay the loans due to limited financial backing. Micro-credit programs geared towards women do exist in Bolivia.

In Bolivia, women have seen an increase in opportunities to contribute to economic decisions, in both private and public sectors, increasing by 70 percent as of 2003.

=== Labor market ===
As Spanish is the dominant language in Bolivia, this causes a gap between Spanish speakers, bilingual speakers of Spanish and indigenous languages, and just the indigenous speakers. The gap is defined by how men and women will learn Spanish and if learned, what market labor participation they will have. Bolivian women that live in rural communities and have recently migrated to the urban cities usually do not know Spanish because being excluded from the rest of the population that knows Spanish. However, for men it doesn't matter if they migrated to an urban city from a rural community, they will more likely have opportunities to participate in the labor force. The older generation that live in the rural and urban communities mostly do not know Spanish. Women who have a large number of children usually do not work in the labor force, and then are not enticed to learn Spanish.

Women have lower labor force participation rate than do men. Because they have a lower participation rate, they are less able to have an education. According to the Human Development Report of 2012, the average years of schooling for men and women adults is 9.2 years. When women do not have a proper education, they will not be capable of having jobs that provide them with a decent income. Also, according to the 2012 GII table, the inequality-adjusted income index is 0.294.

Women living in La Paz earn a higher amount of money in comparison to women living in other urban cities of Bolivia. This is because La Paz is closely tied to government departments in which the government supports and encourages women by having them work in government related occupations.

In Bolivia, women who know only Spanish earn 28% more than women who are bilingual in Spanish and an indigenous language. Women who are bilingual earn 25% more than women who only speak an indigenous language. For women, the difference in making a certain amount of money in the labor market depends highly on their language skills. It is because it depends on the areas in how much they value Spanish for productivity in the labor market. Also, because of discrimination against indigenous people who are most likely poorly educated and have low quality Spanish skills.

=== International migration ===
Most of migration out of Bolivia has been attributed to the economic pressures due to the neoliberal regime. The reasons for international migrations is an unstable economy, high poverty and unemployment level. For women, generally being mistreated and discriminated within their society motivates them to leave their homes. Informal economies in Latin America have conformed to new policies imposed from Northern Countries and European countries. According to scholar Lourdes Beneria, there needs to be a balance between the family and labor market by integrating the capabilities approach (Nussbaum) and reconsider European policies.

Informal jobs increased by many policies that introduced for example, budget cuts and privatization policies. It reduced state monitoring and opened a free market for developing states to become global competitors and foreign investors. In 2006, Bolivia has the highest number of population over 55 percent that are a part of informal activities. It does not include undocumented migrants. Some of these workers have low income jobs or work as self-employers. However, majority of them migrate for work temporarily.

Although migration takes place between Latin American countries, many women migrate to Western European countries as domestic workers because the middle-class and upper-class women in those countries do not have time to work both in the labor force and in domestic work. The migrant workers help them out with child care, household chores, elderly care, and social reproduction.

In Bolivia because there is not mobilization of domestic and market labor, women usually don't separate child care from work responsibilities. In order to care for their children many women don't work in formal jobs. There are a variety of incentives for women to leave their families temporarily. For example, instability, abuse, gender discrimination. They leave thinking that eventually their family will follow their example and to the same. The people within the household then have to be in charge of taking care of each other and in doing domestic work. The children have to depend on extended family and don't feel loved when their mother is away. It is harder for children to have their mothers gone than fathers because it goes against the traditional norm that the father is supposed to leave in order to provide.

The problem is complex in that it relies on the changes of policies made in the host country. Another part of the problem is that the solution depends to have a high level of gender equality within the gender division of work force. The purpose of integrating the capabilities approach and public policies so that the people will be capable in order to function and live a good life. Using a scholar, Ingrid Robeyns list is not completely universal, but function with a particular group of people who have different types of work than others. (1) being able to raise children and to take care of other; (2) being able to work in the labor market or to undertake other projects; (3) being able to be mobile; (4) being able to engage in leisure activities; and (5) being able to exercise autonomy in allocating one's time. Some capabilities can be applied to certain geographical areas than others. The majority of them would be applied to a community level than national or regional. It saves time for household members and mostly women working in the informal economy.

== Property rights ==
Due to cultural prejudice women suffer from discrimination regarding land acquisition, however, numbers have increased regarding women's ownership of land. The Bolivian Land Reform Act of 1996 states that land rights be handled equally between genders and peoples. In 1990, only 9 percent of land was owned individually or jointly by women. By 2004 that number had increased to 40 percent. Women have the same opportunity to access property as men do, however this generally affects only women in urban areas, as women in more rural areas are subject to traditional practices. The National Indigenous Women's Federation represents Indigenous women seeking to acquire property titles. Between 2006 and 2009, 10,299 land grants were granted to women, totaling 164,401 hectares.

=== Conditional cash transfer ===
In 2009, the Vice-Ministry for Equal Opportunities was created within the Ministry of Justice to promote women's rights by making public policies within the whole country. These would consider the rights of indigenous women.

In the same year, another organization was created. Bono Juana Azurday (BJA) is a conditional cash transfer scheme, which assists people living in poverty by giving them monthly payments. In return the group of people would have to agree act and do certain behaviors. The main goal of the Bolivian CCT program was to concentrate on women's needs and create gender equity. In addition, BJA was made to help children's education have security for the elderly. However, when this organization was created it did not involve with women's agencies or the government's gender organizations. As a result, the women's issues were ignored completely and especially rights were suppressed.

The CCT program, BJA, had more negative effects on the women than positive, according to the indigenous women of Bolivia. The women were required to go to education classes, participate in maternal health activities and go to family planning sessions. They were not educated about their rights. In addition, women had to surrender their rights to reproduce because of the BJA regulations. For, example, women would have to wait two years to have another child in order to have another cash transfer, but if they did conceive a child then the second cash transfer would be postponed.

Another obstacle for Bolivian women nearing labor is that they are required to give birth in hospitals instead of their homes. This requirement allows them to receive proper maternal care. However, the women would have to walk or travel a far distance in order to get to the nearest hospital. There is a health clinic serving as a waiting place for them before they are about to go into labor. With the different atmosphere of hospitals and waiting clinics, and with differences between hospital staff and the indigenous women, there is a gap of misunderstanding of cultural tradition and the BJA's regulations.

The progress women made with the CCT program is that they were able to gain self-confidence through financial services. They were able to have more control over the money inside the household. Also, indigenous women had access to their own documentation and for their children. This allowed them to be recognized by the Bolivian government in order for them to have the same rights as other citizens.

The cash transfers were given to the women in order for them to take care of their children and their maternal health. It also gave them an opportunity to create a social network while moving to urban areas. The CCT program helped the welfare needs of the indigenous women. The CCT program did not pay much attention to the women's voice, give them more opportunities in order to move forward in the economy or could help them participate more as a community. There was a feeling of discrimination between the indigenous women and the staff workers, because the women did not speak Spanish and were not able to communicate effectively. The gender equity did not improve between men and women because the women were not able to improve their economic social status with the financial help they received.

== Crime against women ==
Physical abuse and rape are the highest experienced crimes against women in Bolivia. A 1986 report from a hospital in La Paz stated that out of the 1,432 cases of rape and abuse, 66 percent were committed against women. 77.5 percent of those crimes were committed by husbands or family members, followed by 13 percent committed by strangers. Most cases are never brought to court, due to the subordinate expectations of women in Bolivian society.

=== Domestic violence ===
Historically, a husband was legally allowed to beat his wife or children to show his role as a paternal authority until 1973. Since 1973, domestic abuse has been cited as a reason for separation or divorce, but was not allowed to be taken to court by family members, except in cases when the injuries caused incapacitation for more than 30 days. It wasn't until 1995 that domestic violence became illegal, however, domestic violence towards women makes up for more than half of all assaults reported in the country. Half of Bolivian women have experienced sexual, physical or psychological abuse by a partner. 9 out of 10 women are believed to have experienced general violence towards them, while the opposite is for men: only 1 in 10 has experience violence directed at them. A United States State Department report in 1998 reported that 5 percent of women were physically abused and 48 percent psychologically abused. The Bolivian government estimates that approximately 100,000 incidents go unreported each year. The lack of women's support groups and domestic abuse shelters also contribute to the persistent violence.

=== Work abuse ===
Poor indigenous women are prone to often working in menial low paying jobs such as domestic service. A 1988 survey acknowledged that domestic servants do experience at work abuse, including sexual abuse by their employers. Maids also may experience discrimination, not being allowed to enter certain rooms of houses and utilize their employers utensils and household items.

=== Rape and sexual assault ===
Rape is illegal. In 2013, Bolivia passed a new comprehensive domestic violence law, which outlaws many forms of abuse of women, including marital rape. In the first half of 1995, 3.5 rapes were reported each day, though the Congressional Committee on Women estimates that twice as many were not reported. Sexual assault and abuse is considered a crime against the morality of the community, rather than against the victim. The proof often falls on the victim, due to the generally private nature of sexual crimes, therefore most crimes are never taken to court due to the struggle for proof and high costs of legal fees. Rape cases that make it to court are often challenged by the rapist who might call the reputation of the victim into question. Prostitutes are not protected by the courts.

=== Discrimination ===
A presidential decree was declared in 1995 which provided equal rights for women and promised that the government would cease sexism against women.

==== Discrimination against indigenous women ====
Bolivia has the highest indigenous population in Latin America. The agricultural work of indigenous women, who often work alongside their husbands, is not recognized by Bolivian society as being productive. Indigenous women are considered inferior in Bolivian society. Opportunities regarding education and training are extremely poor. Lack of awareness about their legal rights and strict traditional gender roles contribute to their roles within Bolivian society. Many of the rural projects being programmed by new NGO's focus mainly on men.

== Health ==
=== Maternal and child healthcare ===
Between 1992 and 1993, child mortality rate went down for children 5 years and under, due to a primary healthcare programme in a rural community of Bolivia. The Andean Rural Health Care(ARHC)is a U.S. private organization, and is voluntary. Its focus is on maternal and child health care and have care services to prevent and cure diseases. It cooperates with staff and facilities from Bolivian Ministry of Health(MoH) to be more effective.

The region has two distinct areas across from each other in the high plains just north of La Paz. The first area is Carbuco, which has low quality health care services. Ancoraimes is the second area and is known as the intervention area that has health care services available. Both populations work mainly in agriculture and domestic livestock production.

In 1993, 95 percent of children ages 12 month to 23 months were enrolled in the health programme. The documentation shows that 78 percent were vaccinated. Mothers were trained to recognize the symptoms of pneumonia and 60 percent reported pneumonia cases to get medical assistance. In addition, the availability of clean water and sanitation was located within intervention areas, but only reached 10 percent of households.

Indigenous couples are also less prone to discussing family planning with each other, despite male partner desires to not want additional children, as well. Indigenous women feel that their partners don't want to discuss the topic of family planning, thus the conversation is never had. Despite this communication problem, the Guttmacher Institute report found that the majority of both indigenous and non-indigenous couples approve of family planning. 44% of indigenous women said that they do not want a child but will not use contraceptives, versus 26 percent of non-indigenous women.

A 1983 survey found that over 70 percent of Bolivian women used no birth control method. 23.6 percent of women used contraceptives, with 6.1 percent being birth control pills or IUDs. Women also use the rhythm method, which often maternal mortality rates. A 1998 survey reported that maternal death in Bolivia was one of the highest in the world, with women living in the altiplano suffering from higher rates. Main health causes of maternal mortality are infection, hemorrhages, complicates from childbirth and from abortion. Fertility rates in Bolivia are among the highest in Latin America. UNESCO reported in 1996 that the fertility rate was 4.7 children per woman.

While pregnant, 63 percent of urban living women seek prenatal care. Women who do not seek prenatal care cite the high cost of services, lack of trust in medical professionals, and lack of education on the value of prenatal care as reasons for not seeking services.

=== Family and home life ===
When it comes to household responsibilities girls second in line to household tasks behind their mothers. Mothers often work at market, or as cooks, domestic servants or similar service jobs in order to provide for the family. Due to this demand for work, girls are expected to help with household chores and the care of their siblings while their mother works.

The legal age for women to marry in Bolivia is 14 and 16 years of age for men. Early marriage require parental consent, with a judge being able to grant consent if the parents do not or cannot approve. A United Nations study in 2004 reported that 12 percent of girls between ages 15 and 19 were married, divorced or widowed.

== See also ==
- Conditional cash transfer
- Gender politics
