= Aramburo =

Aramburo or Arámburo is a surname of Basque and French (Île-de-France) origins that may refer to

- Alberto Alvarado Arámburo (1925–1996), Mexican politician
- Ana Santos Aramburo (born 1957), Spanish librarian
- Ángel César Mendoza Arámburo (1934–2014), Mexican politician
- Diego Aramburo (born 1971), Bolivian actress, director, and playwright
