= Legión Femenina de Educación Popular de América =

Legión Femenina de Educación Popular de América was a women's organization in Bolivia, founded in 1932.

It was the second women's organization in Bolivia and the leading women's association for several decades, and played a significant role in the campaign for women's suffrage, which was finally introduced in Bolivia in 1952.

== History ==
The organization was preceded by the Ateneo Femenino, which had been founded in 1923 and started the women's movement in Bolivia. In 1932, it was followed by the foundation of the Legión Femenina de Educación Popular de América by Etelvina Villanueva y Saavedra, and for several decades, the Bolivian women's movement were dominated and split between these two groups, which also conducted the women's suffrage campaign.

The Bolivian women's movement consisted by a small minority of well educated women, and had great difficulty to achieve success in the deeply conservative Catholic nation. Women in Bolivia were given access to higher education and given the right to study at university in the 1920s, but thereafter, there were no new reforms in women's rights until the introduction of women's suffrage thirty years later. The two women's organizations campaigned for women's suffrage via male relatives with political office. In 1936, they mutually presented a women's suffrage petition to the Parliament. In 1947, women were given municipal suffrage. In 1952, women were finally granted suffrage on national level.
