= Atanasio de Urioste =

Bolivian merchant and magnate

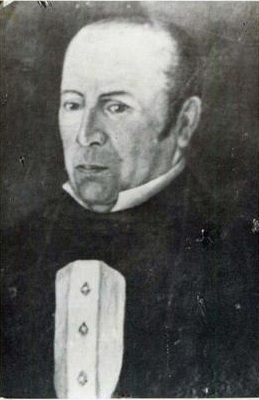
- Born: José Atanasio Cecilio de Urioste de las Carreras; 2 May 1798; Bilbao, Spain
- Died: 5 January 1864 (aged 65); Sucre, Bolivia
- Resting place: General Cemetery of Sucre
- Citizenship: Bolivian
- Occupation: Merchant
- Spouse: Micaela Dionisia Gómez Martínez
- Children: 6

Atanasio de Urioste de las Carreras (2 May 1798 - 5 January 1864) was a Bolivian merchant and magnate and the founder of the Urioste family. He attained a great fortune through his commerce and became one of the richest men in the nascent nation of Bolivia. His descendants include the famed Princess of La Glorieta, a very popular figure in Bolivia, Atanasio de Urioste Velasco, and the industrialist Armando Julio Urioste Arana.

== Life ==
He was the son of Juan Gregorio de Urioste del Valle and Eugenia Lucía de Las Carreras de los Heros, natives of what is now the metropolitan region of Bilbao, in Spain. During his childhood, the province of Vizcaya had been devastated by the Napoleonic Wars and, as such, his father would send him to Buenos Aires at the age of 14 to live under the tutelage of his maternal uncle, Don Manuel de las Carreras.

Once he was a young adult, he would move to the city of Potosí, in Bolivia, where he would establish a mercantile route connecting it to the port city of Arica. Transporting silver and other resources from Upper Peru to the global market, Urioste became very wealthy and, as such, came to be a powerful figure in the new Bolivian Republic.

It was in Potosí that he founded the Casa Urioste, a house of commerce established for the mercantile route he established. This would be his main source of income and later he would expand to the mining industry.

In Potosí he would meet and later marry Micaela Dionisia Gómez Martínez, the daughter of the royal governor of Salta, Miguel Francisco Gómez.

== Marriage and children ==
Married to Micaela Gómez, Urioste would have six children: Melitón; Lorenza Pastora; Juan Manuel; Ezequiel; María Encarnación; and Rosa Petronila. Through his eldest son, Melitón, he is an ancestor of the Princess of La Glorieta, Atanasio de Urioste Velasco, and of the magnate and industrialist Armando Julio Urioste Arana.
