= Atanasio de Urioste Velasco =

Bolivian diplomat, politician and socialite

The Honorable Atanasio de Urioste Velasco
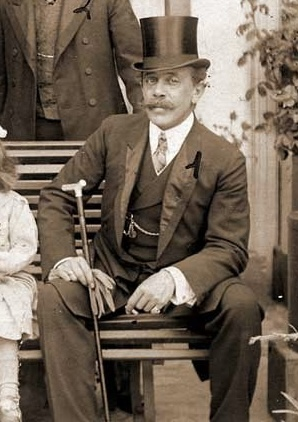

Personal details
- Born: Manuel Francisco Atanasio de Urioste Velasco; 1 January 1861 Sucre, Bolivia
- Died: 28 March 1925 (aged 64) Sucre, Bolivia
- Resting place: General Cemetery of Sucre
- Party: Liberal Party
- Spouse: Adela Arana Costas
- Children: 6
- Education: University of San Francisco Xavier
- Occupation: Diplomat
- Awards: Royal Order of Isabella the Catholic
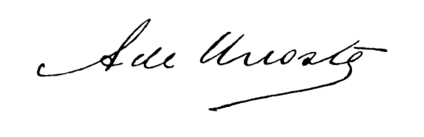
- Signature

Atanasio de Urioste Velasco (1 January 1861 – 28 March 1925) was a Bolivian diplomat, politician, and socialite who served in Bolivian delegations to France and Russia. He belonged to the prominent Urioste family, grandson of the magnate Atanasio de Urioste, brother of the Princess of La Glorieta, Clotilde de Urioste, and father to the industrialist and business magnate Armando Julio Urioste Arana. He was secretary of the special mission to represent Bolivia at the coronation of Alfonso XIII of Spain in 1902. He would be the recipient of the Spanish civil Order of Isabella the Catholic, an honor he received due to his distinguished services in the field of diplomacy.

== Early life ==
=== Family and education ===
The son of Melitón de Urioste Gómez and Petronila Clotilde Velasco del Rivero, who was a first cousin of José Miguel de Velasco, he was born in the city of Sucre to a prominent family. He was educated in France and England where he received an excellent education and established connections for his later career as a diplomat.

He attended the Lycée Fénelon Sainte-Marie in Paris and Ealing Grammar School in London. While in England, he met with fellow Bolivian aristocrat José Gutiérrez Guerra, who attended Stonyhurst College and would become President of Bolivia.

During his time in United Kingdom, Urioste developed liberal tendencies that would follow him to Bolivia once he returned. Embracing liberalism in economics, he was a staunch proponent of capitalism and industrialisation in his home country.

== Political career ==
=== Staunch liberalism and clashes with Baptista ===
Urioste's political career began in 1884 when he joined Eliodoro Camacho's Liberal Party. That same year, Gregorio Pacheco had been elected President of Bolivia and, although conservative in nature, would become a mentor to Urioste. Regardless of his radical liberal ideas, Urioste became a close ally and business partner of Pacheco and future president Aniceto Arce. Urioste distinguished himself serving in the Chamber of Deputies. He played a crucial role in expanding and creating electrical grids for several cities in Bolivia, mainly in Sucre. He would become the owner of the first telecommunications and electrical company in Sucre.

During his time in the Chamber of Deputies, there were several instances of fights and disagreements, as noted by the recorded transcripts of many sessions, involving Urioste. He was remembered for being inflexible and passionate, being a staunch liberal, which often led to intense verbal jousts with his political opponents.

To his party's dismay, Urioste often acted as a link between the Liberals and Conservatives, oftentimes acting as a mediator between the party leaders. For this, he often clashed with his own partisans as well as with the Conservatives. However, when Mariano Baptista became president in 1892, Urioste's relationship with the Conservatives began to sour. Baptista was not a businessman and he had no connection to Urioste, which meant that clashes of ideology would be frequent between the two. Even before Baptista had risen to the presidency, the two had often had thunderous clashes in Congress. Even after Baptista was president, Urioste often argued and disagreed with him.

=== Easter lynch mob ===
One of the most famous stories about Urioste took place during the presidency of Aniceto Arce when a mob surrounded the Cathedral of Sucre during Easter and had the intention to lynch the president. Urioste disguised him as a priest and took him into his own home, despite the fact that they had completely opposing political views. They were, however, business partners and allies at the time, showing Urioste's self-interest in saving the President's life.

== Banking activities ==
Throughout his life he held various diplomatic positions, his most prominent one being in France. He would also work as a banker and administrator, as he came to be the General Manager of the Argandoña Bank, where he played a crucial role in its creation and flourishment. President Baptista had actually initially opposed the creation of the bank, especially because Francisco Argandoña was a brother-in-law to his fierce rival. Eventually, Baptista, through Arce's efforts, approved and the Bank was created through the Law of October 22, 1892. He also served as Chairman of the Board of Directors of the Huanchaca Company.

== Personal life ==
Urioste was married to Adela Arana in 1882, a member of an illustrious Bolivian family, with whom he had six children: Amelia Adela; Armando Julio; Luis Roberto; Emma; Gastón Marcel; and Amalia. His son, Armando Julio, would be an important Bolivian industrialist and one of the wealthiest men in the country.
