= Francisco Argandoña =

Bolivian politician

His Excellency Francisco Argandoña
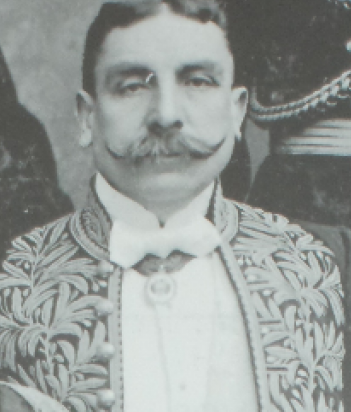
- Born: June 4, 1850; Potosi, Bolivia
- Died: August 27, 1910; Paris, France
- Occupations: Prince, diplomat
- Title: Prince of La Glorieta
- Spouse: Clotilde Urioste de Argandoña

Francisco Argandoña Revilla (4 June 1850 - 27 August 1910) was Prince of La Glorieta, based in the city of Sucre in Bolivia. Along with his wife, Clotilde Urioste de Argandoña, he founded many charitable organizations and was famous for his charity. Together, they founded the "San Francisco" and "Santa Clotilde" orphanages.

== Life ==
He was born in the city of Potosí on June 4, 1850, the son of a family of mining origin related to the Huanchaca mines; I study mineralogy at The Mackay School in Valparaíso. Upon his return to the country he began working at the Huanchaca Mining Company, and managed to buy shares worth 200,000 pesos. In 1868, he settled in the city of Sucre, where he developed extensive philanthropic and charitable work. In 1874 he married Clotilde Urioste Velasco.

== Business and political life ==
In 1878, there was a real boom in the Huanchaca Mine, where silver began to be extracted in abundance, enriching the coffers of Francisco and Clotilde. In 1879, he made a loan to the Government of Bolivia, in order to defray the costs of the War of the Pacific.

In 1890, Francisco Argandoña had a very important amount of money saved, he wanted to invest in something other than the mines, for this he resorted to the advice of his brother-in-law Clodoveo Urioste Velasco, who was an expert in financial transactions. His brother-in-law Atanasio de Urioste Velasco advised him that the best business was to open a bank. In 1892, the "Banco Francisco Argandoña" was inaugurated and established itself as a money issuing and commercial bank in accordance with the laws of 1890 and 1891. Thanks to the prevailing conditions at that time, investing the capital of Francisco Argandoña in the Banco It was the best deal that could happen. Banco Argandoña was active for 20 years (1892–1912).

In 1894, the Argandoña-Urioste couple began their diplomatic life when Francisco Argandoña was appointed Chargé d'Affaires of Bolivia to Palacio de la Moneda in Santiago de Chile. Shortly thereafter, the Government of Bolivia appointed Francisco Argandoña Extraordinary Envoy and Minister Plenipotentiary to the Holy See and the European Courts. He accepted the position on an honorary basis, consequently the couple settled in Paris and bought an important property located on Víctor Hugo Avenue, near the Arc de Triomphe. He also had to represent Bolivia in the Courts of Rome, Saint Petersburg, Berlin and Madrid. He carried out an important diplomatic activity, making known the history, geography and customs of Bolivia, as not even in the diplomatic world was the existence of Bolivia known.

On August 27, 1910, after a short illness, Argandoña died.
