= Ana Rosa Tornero =

Bolivian writer and feminist (1907–1984)

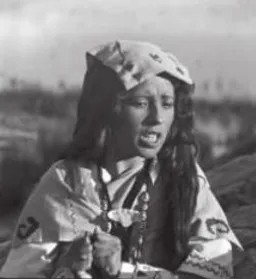
- Ana Rosa Tornero in Wara Wara (1930)
- Born: Ana Rosa Tornero; 1907; Bolivia
- Died: 27 February 1984; Albuquerque, New Mexico, USA
- Other names: Ana Rosa Tornero de Bilbao La Vieja; Ana Rosa Tornero de Bilbao
- Occupations: writer, journalist, feminist
- Years active: 1920–?

Ana Rosa Tornero de Bilbao La Vieja (1907–1984) was a Bolivian writer, journalist, teacher, social reformer and a feminist activist. She published the first feminist magazine in Bolivia and was one of the founders of the first feminist organization in the country.

== Biography ==
Ana Rosa Tornero was born in Bolivia in 1907. Beginning in the 1920s, Tornero was teaching and directing public schools in Cochabamba and La Paz, where she served as a professor of philosophy and letters. Simultaneously, she was the editor of El Norte newspaper. Later, served as editor of El Diario de La Paz. She also is credited with publishing the first feminist magazine in La Paz, Ideal Femenino in August 1922. In the early 1920s, she married educator Roberto Bilbao la Vieja and had one son, who was also named Roberto and also became a teacher.

In 1923, María Sánchez Bustamante organized the first feminist group in Bolivia, Ateneo Femenino with the goals of attaining civil and political equality as well as furthering their artistic growth. Charter members were artists, journalists, teachers and writers and included Leticia Antezana de Alberti, Elvira Benguria, Fidelia Corral de Sánchez, Marina Lijerón, Julia Reyes Ortiz de Cañedo, Ema Alina Palfray, Emma Pérez de Carvajal, María Josefa Saavedra, Ana Rosa Vásquez, and Etelvina Villanueva y Saavedra. They organized their own journal, Eco Femenino. From its inception, Tornero ran the magazine printing literary submissions and articles on feminism.

In the 1920s, a group of intellectuals formed a group called La Brasa to explore the concept of Americanism. It initially formed in Santiago del Estero Argentina. Tornero, was a member of the American Popular Revolutionary Alliance (APRA), which had similar aims and focused on land reform, indigenous rights, and cultural preservation. Tornero was invited by La Brasa members to participate in several poetry readings in 1928 in Santiago del Estero and La Banda. In 1929 El Ateneo Femenino organized the First Female Congress, held in La Paz. Tornero was one of the leaders of the Congress. The agenda adopted at the end of the meeting was one of civic, economic and political liberation, specifically calling for the right to have an identity card, dispose of property, have equal footing as parents, and the right for literate women to vote.

At the beginning of the 1930s, Tornero played a significant role during the Chaco War in soliciting donations via the Radio Illimani, and she served as a volunteer with the Bolivian Red Cross. She ventured into film at this time, but it was a short-lived venture. Tornero starred in director José María Velasco Maidana's film, Wara Wara (1930) with Luis Pizarroso Cuenca. After a scene was shot featuring a kiss between the two stars, who were members of the Ateneo de la Juventud (Ateneo Youth) theater group, Tornero refused to continue. Fearing the film would cause irreparable harm to her reputation, she quit the picture and denounced it, forcing the director to find a new cast. It was later released with Juanita Taillansier in the starring role.

In 1947, she attended the Primer Congreso Interamericano de Mujeres in Guatemala City, Guatemala. The purpose of the conference was to allow the women a platform to speak on international issues including peace, political equality, and security of human welfare. Tornero headed the third committee of the conference which focused on human rights including economic security, education, health care and freedom of expression.

Tornero died 27 February 1984 in Albuquerque, New Mexico.
