= Clotilde Urioste de Argandoña =

Princess of La Glorieta

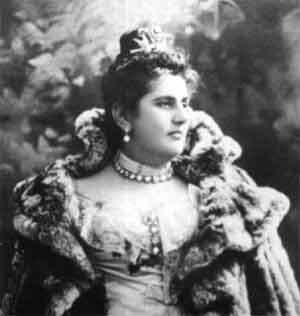
- Born: Clotilde Romualda de Urioste Velasco; 5 February 1857; Sucre, Bolivia
- Died: 29 October 1933 (aged 76); Sucre, Bolivia
- Title: Princess of La Glorieta
- Spouse: Francisco Argandoña Revilla
- Parent(s): Melitón de Urioste Gomez; Petronila Clotilde Velasco del Rivero

Clotilde de Urioste Velasco (5 February 1857 – 29 October 1933) was the princess of La Glorieta and a philanthropist. She was an upper-class Bolivian lady before her appointment as princess, belonging to one of the illustrious families of Sucre, the Urioste family. Her paternal grandfather was Atanasio de Urioste, a wealthy merchant, and she is the sister of the prominent politician and diplomat Atanasio de Urioste Velasco. She married the future Prince of La Glorieta, Francisco Argandoña Revilla in 1874. Together, they were named princes by a papal bull from Pope Leo XIII on 28 December 1898.

== Life ==
Born into a powerful family, Clotilde was the daughter of Melitón de Urioste Gomez and Petronila Clotilde Velasco del Rivero. From her youth she was known for her beauty and good qualities. She married Francisco Argandoña Revilla, one of the business partners of her younger brother, Atanasio, after Aniceto Arce insisted to the Urioste family that the union be carried out.

After her husband's death she took over the regency. During the Chaco War with Paraguay, he left the country and when the conflict was over he returned in October 1932. He carried out many works such as promoting the construction of the railway between Sucre and Potosí and the construction of the road from Sucre to Lagunillas. Among the works of social good, he founded and subsidized the asylum for orphans "Santa Clotilde", in the heraldic shield that reads: "Asylum and instruction to the orphan". After his death in 1933, the Bolivian government expressed its regret and the principality came to an end.

== La Glorieta ==
Clotilde bequeathed the castle of La Glorieta to one of her favorite nephews, Roberto Urioste Arana, son of her brother Atanasio de Urioste Velasco. In 1967 the heir to the castle decided to sell it to the Bolivian State and the Armed Forces for its use as a military institution, functioning as a Military School.
