= Abdón Saavedra =

Vice President of Bolivia from 1926 to 1930

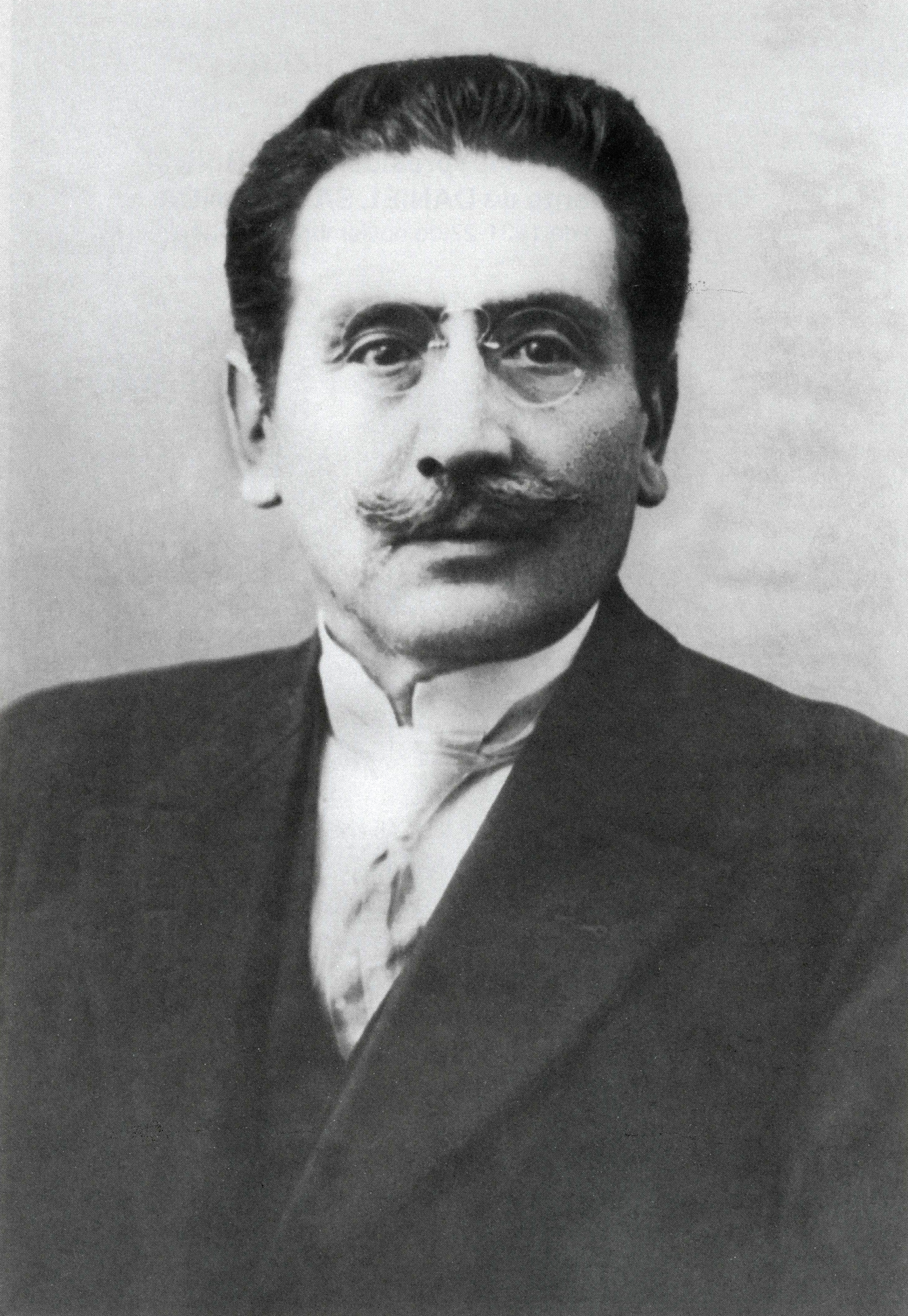
- Formal portrait, c. 1926–1930

22nd Vice President of Bolivia
- In office 10 January 1926 – 28 May 1930
- President: Hernando Siles
- Preceded by: Ismael Vázquez; José Santos
- Succeeded by: José Luis Tejada

Minister of Government
- In office 10 April 1921 – 27 June 1922
- President: Bautista Saavedra
- Preceded by: José R. Estenssoro
- Succeeded by: David Alvéstegui

Personal details
- Born: Abdón Saavedra Mallea; 6 August 1872 La Paz, Bolivia
- Died: 6 January 1942 (aged 69) La Paz, Bolivia
- Political party: Republican
- Parent(s): Zenón Saavedra; Josefa Mallea
- Relatives: Bautista Saavedra (brother)
- Occupation: Lawyer; politician

Abdón Saavedra Mallea (Note: In this Spanish name, the first or paternal surname is Saavedra and the second or maternal family name is Mallea.) (6 August 1872 – 6 January 1942) was a Bolivian lawyer and politician who served as the 22nd vice president of Bolivia from 1926 to 1930 under Hernando Siles. He was the brother of Bautista Saavedra.

Political offices
| Preceded by José R. Estenssoro | Minister of Government; 1921–1922 | Succeeded by David Alvéstegui |
| Preceded by Ismael Vázquez; José Santos | Vice President of Bolivia; 1926–1930 | Succeeded by José Luis Tejada |
