= María Luisa Sánchez Bustamante =

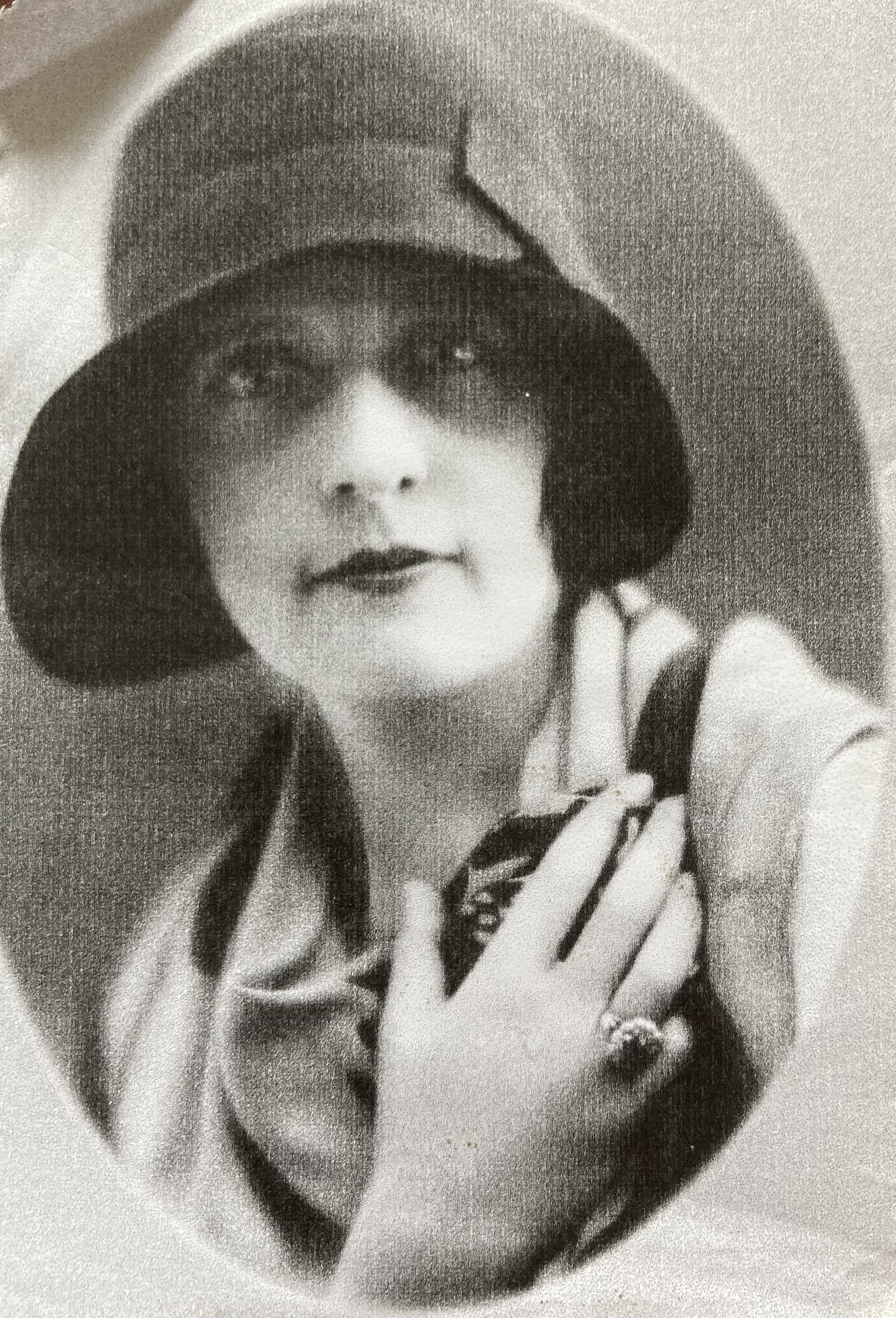
- Born: August 19, 1896; Sucre, Bolivia
- Died: July 3, 1988 (aged 91); La Paz, Bolivia
- Occupation: Feminist
- Spouse: Armando Julio de Urioste Arana
- Parent(s): Daniel Sánchez Bustamante; Carmen Calvo Molina

María Luisa Sánchez Bustamante de Urioste (19 August 1896 - 3 July 1988) was a prominent Bolivian feminist, educator, and politician. She was the founder of the Ateneo Femenino, an organization which was crucial in the fight for equality in Bolivia. She was president of said organization, a position she maintained for twenty-eight consecutive years. She is the aunt of Gonzalo Sánchez de Lozada, who served as President of Bolivia on two occasions: (1993-1997) and (2002-2003).

== Early life and education ==
Born on August 19, 1896, in Sucre, María Luisa was the daughter of Dr. Daniel Sánchez Bustamante, a lawyer and diplomat who had a profound influence on her life, and Carmen Calvo Molina, granddaughter of Dr. Manuel Molina Zamudio and grandniece of Tomás Frías. Her siblings were Vicente, Julio, Daniel, Isabel, Carmen, Mercedes, Luz, Javier, and Jaime. From a young age, she stood out for her intelligence and energetic character. Her early education was at private schools in Sucre, later continuing at the Liceo de Señoritas, where she began to develop critical thinking and social awareness.

=== Early social commitment ===
Sánchez Bustamante worked as an educator in La Paz, where she married in 1919 to Armando Julio de Urioste Arana, an industrial magnate who was managing director of the Cement Society and director of the Construction Company of La Paz. The couple had two children. Despite social expectations to devote herself solely to the household, she remained actively engaged in the intellectual and cultural life of La Paz.

In 1935, together with other intellectual women, she founded the Unión Femenina de Bolivia (UFB), an organization dedicated to promoting women's civil rights, focusing on women’s suffrage, education, and the reform of the Civil Code.

== Political activism and achievements ==
During the 1940s, María Luisa intensified her activism. She was a key figure in the campaign for women's voting rights. In 1947, the UFB submitted a proposal to Congress advocating for women's suffrage, which was initially rejected, but laid the groundwork for future change.

Sánchez Bustamante also engaged in broader social causes. She collaborated with literacy campaigns, promoted the creation of public libraries, and fought against discrimination toward Indigenous peoples. She was invited to participate in several international forums, including meetings of the Inter-American Commission of Women and the United Nations.

Finally, universal female suffrage was recognized in Bolivia in 1952, following the National Revolution. The 1952 Constitution incorporated women’s political rights, a landmark victory for María Luisa and the UFB.

=== Recognition and legacy ===
Throughout her life, María Luisa received numerous honors for her educational and civic contributions. She was named Honorary President of the UFB and was decorated by both the Bolivian state and international organizations. In 1986, on the 50th anniversary of the UFB’s founding, she was honored in La Paz, recognizing her trailblazing role in Bolivian feminism.

She died on July 3, 1988, leaving behind a lasting legacy in the history of women’s rights in Bolivia. She is remembered as a sui generis feminist, who combined social commitment, political action, and humanist sensitivity.
