= Julieta Montaño =

Bolivian attorney, human rights defender, woman's rights activist and feminist writer

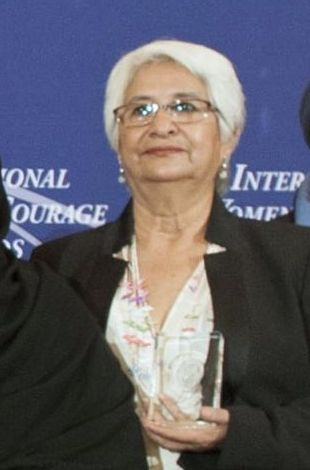
- in 2015
- Born: Rosa Julieta Montaño Salvatierra; 16 August 1946 (age 79); Quillacollo, Cochabamba, Bolivia
- Occupations: attorney, human rights activist
- Years active: 1981–present
- Known for: Oficina Jurídica para la Mujer

Rosa Julieta Montaño Salvatierra (born 1946) is a Bolivian attorney, human rights defender, woman's rights activist, feminist writer and a 2015 winner of the US State Department's International Women of Courage Award.

== Early life ==
Rosa Julieta Montaño Salvatierra was born 16 August 1946 in Quillacollo, Cochabamba, Bolivia. She completed her basic studies and then earned a Bachelor's Degree in Humanities from the Universidad Mayor de San Simón in 1965. Completing her Law Degree at the same university in 1972, Montaño earned Master's Degrees in human rights and political science at the Universidad Mayor de San Simón and University of Huelva, Huelva, Spain and went on to work on her doctorate in human rights at the Universidad Pablo de Olavide in Seville, Spain.

== Biography ==
Montaño has served as Vice President of the Human Rights Assembly of Bolivia and as the Comptroller of Cochabamba, Bolivia. From 1997 to 2002 she served in the Chamber of Deputies representing the Cochabamba Department.

In 1981, during the Bolivian Cocaine Coup, Julieta Montaño, who was at that time heading the Union de Mujeres de Bolivia (UMBO) (Union of Bolivian Women) was placed under house arrest. The dictatorship ended on 4 August 1981 and Montaño returned to her legal practice.

On 11 April 1985 Montaño founded the Oficina Jurídica para la Mujer (OJM) (Legal Office for Women) to promote women’s rights and work towards the elimination of and protection from sexual exploitation and violence against women. Through education and public policy creation as well as social, psychological, and legal assistance, the organization promotes gender equality. Since its founding, the organization has provided legal aid for rape, sexual harassment and domestic violence to more than 30,000 women and has worked with the Bolivian legislature in drafting laws to protect women from these kinds of issues. As just one such example, in 2013, the Bolivian Government passed a femicide regulation punishing perpetrators with a maximum sentence of thirty years without the possibility of parole. It is the harshest penalty allowed under the law of the country.

Despite being jailed during the era of the Bolivian dictatorship, Montaño has continuously worked to change public policy. According to the US State Department, she has "influenced nearly every piece of legislation that advanced women’s rights over the past 30 years" in Bolivia.

== Associations ==
- 1994–1999: Representative of the Committee for Latin America and the Caribbean for the Defense of Women's Rights (CLADEM).
- 2002–present: Serves on the Board of Directors of Center for Justice and International Law (CEJIL).
- 2004–present: Consultative Honorary Council for CLADEM and she continues to serve as their legal council.
- 2007 General Assembly of the Organization of American States (OAS) appointed Montaña as one of the 7 members of the Inter-American Commission of Human Rights (IACHR).

== Selected works ==
- Sistematización de Experiencias en Respuestas Sociales en Cuestión de Vida: Balance Regional y Desafíos sobre el Derecho de las Mujeres a una Vida sin Violencia. Comité de América Latina y el Caribe para la Defensa de los Derechos de la Mujer – CLADEM, Lima. (2000) (In Spanish).
- "Situación Jurídica de la Mujer" en Suplemento Mujeres del Mundo: Leyes y Políticas y Afectan sus Vidas Reproductivas. Centro Legal para Derechos Reproductivos y Políticas Públicas, DEMUS – Estudio para la Defensa y los Derechos de la Mujer, Nueva York, Estados Unidos. (2000) (In Spanish).
- Derechos reproductivos de la mujer en Bolivia: un informe sombra. (2001) (In Spanish).
- "Bolivia: Ethnicity, Race and Gender" en Race, Ethnicity, Gender, and Human Rights in the Americas: New Paradigm for Activism. (182–186) Washington. (2001) (In English).
- Women's Reproductive Rights in Bolivia: A Shadow Report. (2001) (In English).
- "Principio de los Derechos Humanos: Marco Legal y Normativo" en Agenda Defensorial No. 3. Defensor del Pueblo, La Paz. (2003) (In Spanish).
- Ley Marco sobre Derechos Sexuales y Reproductivos: Principios y Jurisprudencia que la Sustentan. Oficina Jurídica para la Mujer, Cochabamba. (2004) (In Spanish).
- Tendencias de la jurisprudencia internacional en el ámbito de los derechos sexuales y los derechos reproductivos. (2007) (In Spanish).
- Ley marco sobre derechos sexuales y reproductivos : principios y jurisprudencia que la sustentan. (2009) (In Spanish).
