= Hercilia Fernández de Mujía =

Bolivian writer, poet and composer

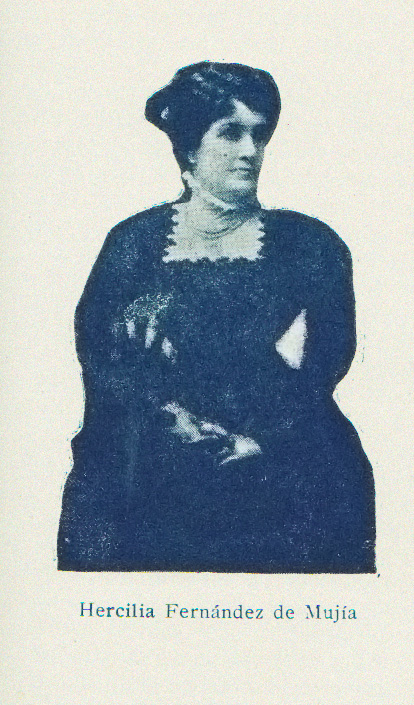
- Born: 1860; Potosi
- Died: 1929 (aged 68–69); Sucre, Bolivia
- Occupations: Writer, poet, composer

Hercilia Fernández de Mujía (1860–1929) was a Bolivian writer, poet and composer.

== Life ==
Mujía was born in Potosi, but she and her two sisters, Ofelia and Matilde, were brought up in the city of Sucre. She is best known for her 1909 book "My Verses". She wrote poetry and prose.

She married a statesman, and another writer, Ricardo Mujía and they had three children, Benjamin, Gaston and Hercilia.

On 25 May 1889 she read a poem she had written publicly to commemorate the uprising in their city that was then called Chuquisaca and the fight for independence 80 years before.

She died in Sucre in 1929.
