= Ismael Vázquez =

Bolivian lawyer, orator and politician

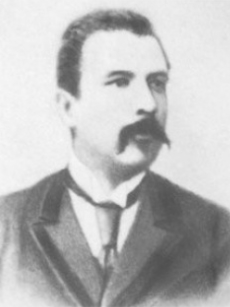

20th Vice President of Bolivia
- First Vice President
- In office 15 August 1917 – 12 July 1920 Serving with José Santos Quinteros
- President: José Gutiérrez Guerra
- Preceded by: Juan Misael Saracho
- Succeeded by: Abdón Saavedra

Personal details
- Born: 26 September 1865 Cochabamba, Bolivia
- Died: 4 September 1930 (aged 64) Cochabamba, Bolivia
- Party: Liberal
- Education: University of San Simón

Ismael Vázquez Virreira (26 September 1865 – 4 September 1930) was a Bolivian lawyer, orator, and politician who served as the 20th vice president of Bolivia from 1917 to 1920. He served as first vice president alongside second vice president José Santos Quinteros during the administration of José Gutiérrez Guerra.

== Biography ==
José Carrasco Torrico was born on 26 September 1865 in Cochabamba. In 1896, he began his political career as a deputy for Cochabamba, a position he would hold multiple times along with the office of senator. In 1911, he was appointed plenipotentiary minister in Venezuela. He was Minister of Justice and Industry in 1915 and was elected first Vice President of the Republic of José Gutiérrez in 1917. In 1919, he was also made Minister of Government. On 12 July 1920, he was overthrown along with the rest of the Gutiérrez government.

He died in Cochabamba on 4 September 1930.

Political offices
Preceded by Juan Misael Saracho	Vice President of Bolivia; First Vice President; 1917–1920; Served alongside: José Santos Quinteros	Succeeded by Abdón Saavedra
