= José Santos Quinteros =

Bolivian politician (1865–1951)

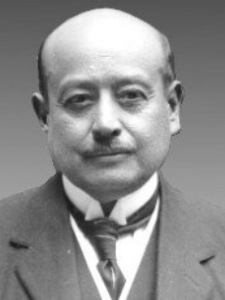

21st Vice President of Bolivia
- Second Vice President
- In office 15 August 1917 – 12 July 1920 Serving with Ismael Vázquez Virreira
- President: José Gutiérrez Guerra
- Preceded by: José Carrasco Torrico
- Succeeded by: Abdón Saavedra

Personal details
- Born: 1 November 1865 Potosí, Bolivia
- Died: 22 February 1951 (aged 85) La Paz, Bolivia
- Party: Liberal

José Santos Quinteros (1 November 1865 – 22 February 1951) was a Bolivian lawyer, professor and politician who served as the 21st vice president of Bolivia from 1917 to 1920. He served as second vice president alongside first vice president Ismael Vázquez Virreira during the administration of José Gutiérrez Guerra.

== Biography ==
José Santos Quinteros was born on 1 November 1865 in Potosí. Shortly after obtaining his professional diploma, he was appointed Professor of Public Law at the University of Saint Francix Xavier. Minister of War between 1905 and 1909 during the administration of Ismael Montes, he served as Senator for Chquisaca in 1910 and Minister of Justice in 1913. In 1917, he was elected second vice president of José Gutiérrez Guerra. While in this position, he was also Minister of Government in 1918 and Minister of War for a second time in 1919.

He died in La Paz on 22 February 1951.

Political offices
Preceded by José Carrasco Torrico	Vice President of Bolivia; Second Vice President; 1917–1920; Served alongside: Ismael Vázquez Virreira	Succeeded by Abdón Saavedra
