= Gigia Talarico =

Chilean-writer and poet

- Born: June 1953 (age 73); Santiago, Chile
- Occupations: Writer, teacher, poet
- Writing career
- Genres: Poetry, novels, children's literature

Luisa Talarico (born 1953) commonly known as Gigia Talarico is a Chilean-born writer and poet.

== Life and work ==
Talarico was born in Santiago de Chile, in June 1953 to a Chilean mother and Italian father. Since the age of 7, she made Santa Cruz de la Sierra, Bolivia her home. At Paris 8 University Vincennes-Saint-Denis, she graduated in fine arts and then went to Stockholm to study literature in Frescati. In the U.S., she earned her master's degree in university education from Framinham (sic) State College, U.S.

== Literary activities ==
The Argentinian publisher house Prosa American published her book entitled El espíritu de la palabra (PROSA, 2010) a poetry essay based on the architectural and poetic creation carried out in the renowned Ciudad abierta, located in Ritoque, Chile. This work resulted from research and interviews with Alberto Cruz, one of the creators.

For two years, she was responsible with other friends, for the annual poetry event Arte Poética e Integración held in Santa Cruz, which enjoyed the participation of poets from several South American countries. Since then, she has organized a youth poetry contest annually, with the goal of encouraging the poetic and pictorial development of young people. She has also written for the Argentinian cultural magazine PROA en las Letras y en las Artes, renamed PROSA.

In 2008 she published her first novel La sonrisa cortada (Argentina and Bolivia). She worked on a novel about a poetic journey through the Amazon in the 1940s and the influences of this constructivist experience in South American poetry. In addition, she worked on a new poetry book entitled Fisuras.

== Selected works ==
She has written eight children's books: Comiendo estrellas, El caracol gigante (Chile), Los tres deseos, Un puñado de sueños, La maleta de Esperanza, Cuentos de niños y gatos. These books have been republished several times and some of them are used in educational institutions. In 1997, she was awarded the National Prize of the Education Reform (8 year-olds category) for her work as a children's literature writer. In addition to her writings, she worked on the second volume of a children's literature anthology entitled Dicen que en mi país (2010), to include some of the most important storytellers in Bolivia.

Her poetry work includes Ángeles de Fuego (Torre de Papel, 2001), Púrpura (Plural, 2007) and her collection of poems, La manzana dorada (El país, 2013). Her poetry is included in several national and international anthologies.

== Selected honors ==
- In 1997, National Prize of the Education Reform (8 year-olds category)
- In 2013, Santa Cruz de la Sierra Municipal Poetry Prize.
- In 2014, Dante Alighieri Santa Cruz Prize for the best book published in poetry, The Golden Apple.
