= Lola Taborga de Requena =

Lola Taborga de Requena (1890 - 1970?) was a Bolivian modernist poet.

== Works ==
- Cuadros Incásicos, 1952
- Espigas, 1956
