= Daniel Sánchez Bustamante =

Bolivian politician and educator

Daniel Sánchez-Bustamante
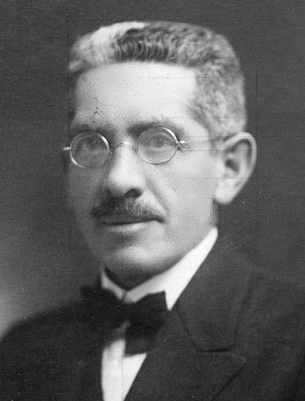

Minister of Foreign Affairs
- In office 7 August 1909 – 19 December 1910
- President: Eliodoro Villazón
- Preceded by: Benedicto Gómez Goytia y Rodo
- Succeeded by: José María Escalier
- In office 5 March 1931 – 21 May 1931
- President: Daniel Salamanca Urey
- Preceded by: Óscar Mariaca Pando
- Succeeded by: Pascual Bailon Mercado

Personal details
- Born: 10 April 1871 La Paz, Bolivia
- Died: 5 August 1933 (aged 62) Buenos Aires, Argentina
- Party: Liberal Party
- Spouse: Carmen Calvo Molina
- Parent(s): Juan Sánchez de Bustamante y Ponce de León; Mercedes Vásquez-Bru y Zuazo
- Occupation: Teacher, politician, author, diplomat

Daniel Sánchez-Bustamante y Vásquez-Bru (10 April 1871 – 5 August 1933) was a Bolivian educator, politician, lawyer, professor, author, and diplomat. He was the Bolivian Minister of Public Instruction and of Foreign Affairs on various occasions between 1909 and 1931. He is considered one of the most important reformers in the public education of his country being the founder of the first school for teacher training. In charge of his country's foreign affairs, he was the main signatory for Bolivia in the Polo-Bustamante Treaty (1909), a border treaty signed with Peru to set what is now the current border between the two Andean nations. He was the father of María Luisa Sánchez-Bustamante and Carmen Sánchez-Bustamante, the mother of Gonzalo Sánchez de Lozada.

== Early life ==
Daniel Sánchez-Bustamante was born in the city of La Paz on 10 April 1871. He was the son of Juan Sánchez de Bustamante y Ponce de León and Mercedes Vásquez-Bru y Zuazo. He received his education in his home city where he studied law and graduated with a doctorate in 1891.

In 1891, he entered into the world of politics and, by the next year, a member of the council of the city of Oruro. Years later, he was elected as a deputy and was a member of the Chamber of Deputies between 1894 and 1900. In those years, he moved to Sucre, then the capital of Bolivia, where he founded the newspaper Revista de Bolivia. He would also collaborate with the Sucre-based newspaper Eco Moderno in 1898. In 1895, he married Carmen Calvo, with whom he had nine children.

== Pedagogical and political career ==
He was also dedicated to teaching, serving as professor of Sociology and Philosophy in the universities of Sucre and La Paz. Furthermore, he was Fue además Instruction Commissioner of the Municipality of La Paz.

As a politician, he was a distinguished member of the Liberal Party and, as such, a defender of the free trade economic model. For a while, he was the legal counsellor to the Bolivian mining magnate Simón I. Patiño.

In 1901, he was named vice secretary of the Office of the Ministry of Government and, as such, was in charge of the drafting of the Electoral and Printing Regulations.

During the administration of Ismael Montes Gamboa, he was Minister of Public Instruction and Justice. During his term, he greatly influenced the development of the country's public education. On 6 June 1909, he founded the first national school for teachers in the country's capital, a date later made Teachers' Days in Bolivia by the Supreme decree of 24 May 1924.

== The Polo-Bustamante Treaty ==
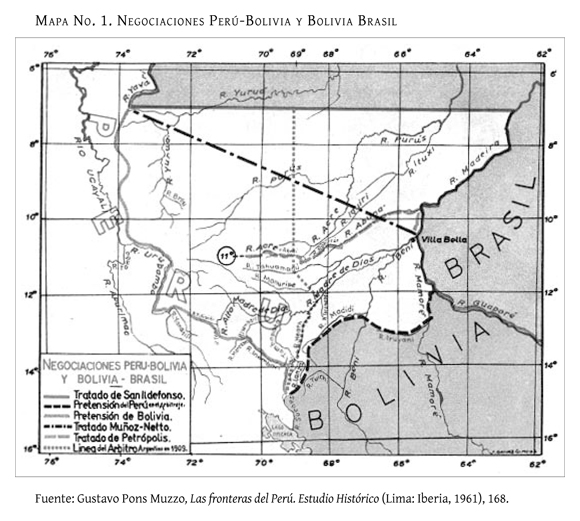
Negotiations between Peru-Bolivia and Brazil-Bolivia over Amazonian territory.

On 7 August 1909, he was assigned Minister of Foreign Affairs on an interim basis and, a week later, on a permanent basis. During his term, the Polo-Bustamante Border Treaty was signed in La Paz on 17 September 1909. With this treaty, the countries of Peru and Bolivia ended a border dispute, which had earlier almost led to war between them. During previous negotiations, both parties accepted the arbitration of Argentine President José Figueroa Alcorta, agreeing on making modifications. The Peruvian Minister of Foreign Affairs, Solón Polo, countersigned the treaty. As such, the treaty bears the names of both signatories, Polo and Bustamante.

Sánchez-Bustamante also endorsed a treaty of Commerce and River Navigation between Bolivia and Brazil, signed in Rio de Janeiro on 12 August 1910. In a memorandum dated 22 April 1910, directed to his Chilean and Peruvian counterparts, he proposed that these two countries stop bordering one another and Bolivia be given access to the Pacific Ocean through the Peruvian provinces of Tacna and Arica, then under Chilean administration.

After 1910, shortly before he left his ministerial position, an incident on the Peruvian border took place which threatened the renewal of hostilities between Bolivia and Peru. A large Bolivian detachment attacked the garrison of Guayabal, in the Manuripe. The smaller Peruvian garrison which defended said post was exterminated; among the casualties of the border skirmish were lieutenant Alejandro Acevedo and sergeant Carlos Zela (19 November 1910). However, the matter was not escalated, since a protocol signed in 1911 between both countries smoothed out the dispute surrounding the execution of the boundary treaty.

== Later career ==
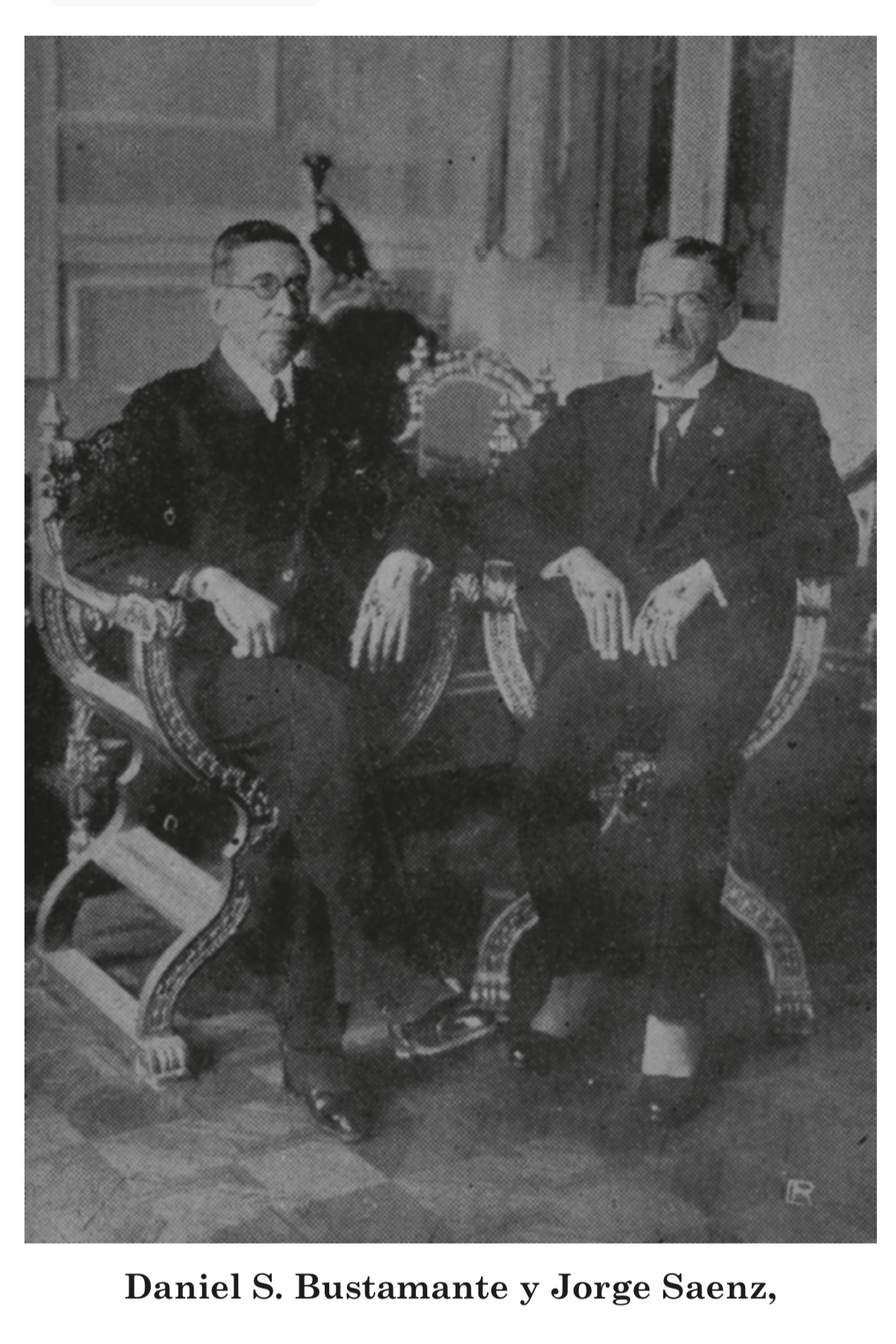
Daniel Sánchez-Bustamante and Jorge Sáenz.

In 1917, during the government of President José Gutiérrez Guerra, he was Minister of Education and Agriculture. He came to be proclaimed Master of Bolivian youth. He was President of Central Bank of Bolivia from 1928 to 1930.

In 1930, he was in charge of drafting the Public Education Statute, which established university autonomy inspired by the postulates of the 1918 university reform initiated in Córdoba, Argentina. In this regard, he had the support of the President of Bolivia, General Carlos Blanco Galindo. On 5 March 1931, he was invested for the second time as Minister of Foreign Affairs, during the presidency of Daniel Salamanca. But this time his tenure was brief, since he resigned on 22 May of the same year. During the Chaco War between Bolivia and Paraguay, he was sent to Buenos Aires as advisor to the Bolivian commission in the peace negotiations, and even met with Argentine President José Félix Uriburu.

He was a member of the Geographical Society of Madrid, the Academy of Social Sciences and the Institute of International Law, among other institutions. In May 1931, he was sent to Argentina to negotiate the sale of oil. He was carrying out said management when he suddenly died in the Argentine capital city of Buenos Aires.

== Family ==
He married Carmen Calvo, with whom he had nine children. Among his children were the two distinguished Bolivian feminists Carmen Sánchez-Bustamante, and María Luisa Sánchez-Bustamante. One of his grandsons, son of his daughter Carmen, is Gonzalo Sánchez de Lozada, who was President of Bolivia on two occasions, (1993–1997) and (2002–2003).

== Publications ==
He is the author of several works on legal, sociological, pedagogical and international law issues, among which the following are his most distinguished:

- 1901: Principios de Derecho
- 1903: Principios de Sociología
- 1904: Opiniones y Discursos
- 1911: Los límites con la República Argentina
- 1917: Los conflictos internacionales y el panamericanismo
- 1919: Bolivia, su estructura y sus derechos en el Pacífico
- 1925: Bolivia en el Primer Centenario de su Independencia
