= José Gutiérrez Guerra =

28th President of Bolivia

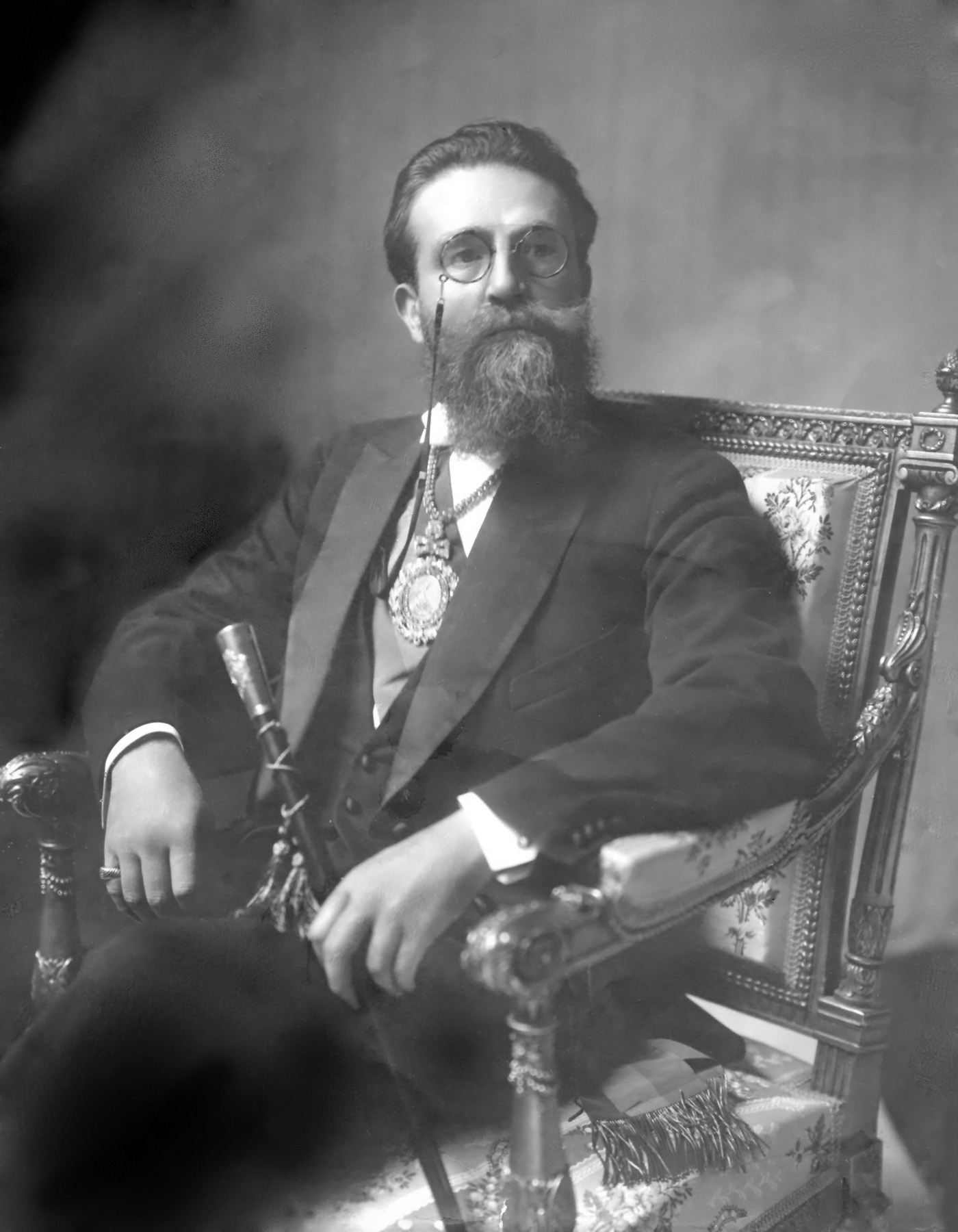

28th President of Bolivia
- In office 15 August 1917 – 12 July 1920
- Vice President: Ismael Vázquez; José Santos Quinteros
- Preceded by: Ismael Montes
- Succeeded by: Bautista Saavedra

Minister of Finance
- In office 4 December 1915 – 18 January 1916
- President: Ismael Montes
- Preceded by: Julio Zamora
- Succeeded by: Néstor Cueto Vidaurre

Personal details
- Born: José Manuel Gutiérrez Guerra; 5 September 1869 Sucre, Bolivia
- Died: 3 February 1929 (aged 59) Antofagasta, Chile
- Party: Liberal
- Spouse: Agar Reyes Calvo
- Parent(s): Lisímaco Gutiérrez; Andrea Guerra
- Relatives: Pedro José Domingo de Guerra (grandfather)
- Education: Merton College, Oxford

José Manuel Gutiérrez Guerra, known as "the last Oligarch," (5 September 1869 in Sucre, Bolivia – 3 February 1929 in Antofagasta, Chile) was a Bolivian economist and statesman who served as the 28th president of Bolivia from 1917 to 1920. He was the grandson of Pedro José Domingo de Guerra, acting president in 1879 and chief justice of the Supreme Court, who had died in office after he was forced to assume presidential responsibilities during the disastrous War of the Pacific.

== Early life and family ==
The scion of two illustrious aristocratic families from Chuquisaca, which traced descent from Incan royalty and the first Spanish conquistadors who came into Peru, judges of the Audiencia of Charcas. On his mother's side, he was also related to Irish physician Francis Rynd and British statesman Lord Palmerston. He was sent to England at an early age to receive education. There, he studied under the Jesuits at Stonyhurst College, then St Bede's College, and Merton College, Oxford, from where he graduated in 1890, aged 21.

He returned to Bolivia, where he worked in banking. An economist by training, he was hesitant to enter politics. As one contemporary put it, "He never sought political preferment." In 1914, he was elected to Congress as deputy from La Paz. His rise was meteoric, however, as he was tipped to succeed Ismael Montes as Liberal party candidate in the 1917 presidential elections.

== Presidency ==
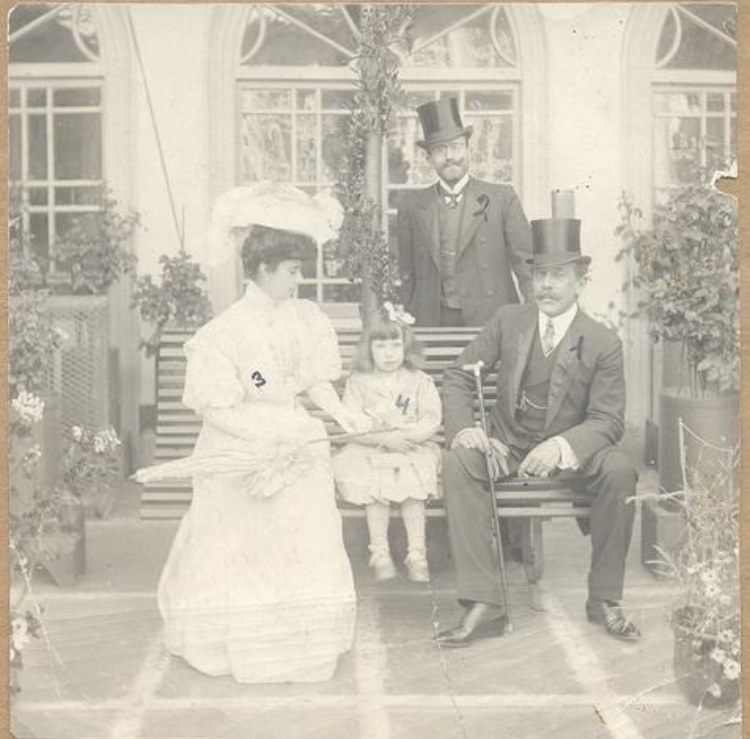
Gutierrez Guerra with his wife, daughter, and Atanasio de Urioste Velasco, one of his political allies.

Having won at the polls, he took office but faced severe problems stemming from worsening economic conditions and mounting opposition from the recently formed Republican party. The 1917 assassination (never fully explained) of the founder of that party and former president, José Manuel Pando, further undermined Gutiérrez's popularity. He failed to act decisively from the point of view of his opponents, despite his call on Congress to launch an official investigation into the alleged excesses and misdeeds of his predecessor and political chief, Ismael Montes. Twenty-plus years of unbroken Liberal control of the government (the longest by one party in the history of Bolivia) had fatigued most Bolivians and turned them against the ruling elites and Gutiérrez became known as 'the last Oligarch.'

During his government, several works were undertaken. These included oil exploitation in Chuquisaca, Santa Cruz and Tarija—deposits given in concession to the American company Richmond Levering. The Beni drinking water service was inaugurated and the contract for the construction of the sewage systems for the cities of La Paz and Cochabamba was signed. The Escuela Nacional de Bolívar de Oruro and Florida de Santa Cruz de la Sierra were built, as well as the Military Aviation School was founded of Alto de La Paz in 1920 and the Mineralogical Museum of Oruro was inaugurated. In January 1920, a law was adopted which introduced free dental care in mining centers while also stipulating (as noted by one study) “that any center with more than fifty workers had to provide free pharmacy and medical services.”

Gutiérrez lost significant support from Bolivia's elite after fining Simón I. Patiño for the smuggling of 10,000 cans of alcohol from Peru, which caused economic damage to the state. He was deposed in the 1920 coup d'état which, with military help, brought to power the opposition Republican party under the leadership of Bautista Saavedra. Gutierrez-Guerra sought refuge in the United States legation at La Paz and went on to take a banking position at New York-based Chase National. He lived the rest of his days in exile, dying in Antofagasta, Chile in 1929.

== Sources ==
- Parker, William Belmont, Bolivians of to-day, pp. 141–144 Hispanic Society of America (2nd ed., 1922) (full text)
- Benavides, Julio M., José Gutiérrez Guerra en nuestra historia económica (1975)
- Urioste, Ovidio Mi historia anecdótica de Bolivia (1951)
- Arce, Caludio (28 July 2013). "Un presidente boliviano sepultado en Antofagasta". El Día.

Political offices
Preceded by Julio Zamora	Minister of Finance; 1915–1916	Succeeded by Néstor Cueto Vidaurre
Preceded by Ismael Montes	President of Bolivia; 1917–1920	Vacant Government Junta Title next held by Bautista Saavedra
Party political offices
Preceded by Ismael Montes	Liberal nominee for President of Bolivia; 1917	Succeeded by Daniel Salamanca; Alliance
