= Diego Aramburo =

Bolivian actress, director, and playwright

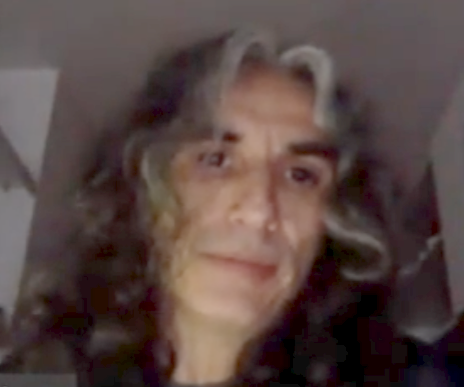
- In an online discussion in 2020
- Born: Diego Aramburo Jordán; 8 September 1971 (age 55); Cochabamba, Bolivia
- Occupations: Actress, dramatist

Diego Aramburo Jordán (born 8 September 1971) is a Bolivian actress, director, and playwright. The founder and director of the Kiknteatr company, she is the winner of 10 Peter Travesí National Theater Awards, in addition to having received various distinctions and recognitions in her country and abroad. Her theater has been characterized by a contemporary style, in which performing and visual arts are mixed. Aramburo has spent much of her career abroad, being frequently invited to direct in theaters and independent companies in various countries in the Americas and Europe.

In May 2018, the artist made her change of gender identity to female official, in an act that sparked intense public debate.

== Biography and artistic career ==
The child of an architect, Diego Aramburo was born on 8 September 1971 in Cochabamba, the city where she began her acting career at age 17. With studies carried out in Brazil, Spain, France, Canada, and the United States, and apprenticeships with teachers such as Jerzy Grotowski, Declan Donnellan, Yoshi Oida, José Sanchis Sinisterra, Mauricio Kartun, and Rafael Spregelburd, Aramburo quickly became the a well-known and controversial director in Cochabamba. In 1996, she founded the Kíkinteatro – later shortened to Kiknteatr – whose name comes from the words kíkin ("similar to", in Quechua) and teatro ("theater", in Spanish). Her first play with the company was Tres fases de la luna, for which she won her first Peter Travesí National Theater Award.

Her subsequent plays, Feroz, Amataramarta, and Ese cuento del amor (written with Claudia Eid), quickly established Aramburo as the most awarded director in Bolivia and brought her invitations to festivals in other countries. Although from the beginning the Kiknteatr opted for its own dramaturgy, it also staged productions by other authors, as with Tierra (2003) by French playwright Hubert Colas, 4.48 Psychosis (2004) by Sarah Kane, and Happy Days (2007) by Samuel Beckett.

In 2004, Aramburo wrote and directed one of her best-known plays, Crudo, with performances by Pati García, Jorge Alaniz, Alejandro Marañón, Lía Michel, and Daniel Larrazábal. García, Alaniz, Marañón, and Michel have been part of the casts of several of Aramburo's shows. Other notable works in the company's history were Transparente (2009), Romeo y Julieta de Aramburo (2013), and the Bolivian Trilogy, comprising Ukhupacha, Morales, and Hejarei (2014–2015).

Parallel to her work in Bolivia, Aramburo has been invited to direct plays in countries such as Canada, Argentina, Ecuador, the Dominican Republic, France, and Romania. In recent years, her productions have also been selected for performance at festivals in Brazil, Chile, Colombia, Cuba, Venezuela, Spain, and Estonia. Her plays Feroz, Ese Cuento del Amor, and Fragmentos Líquidos have been staged abroad.

Aramburo's works have garnered nearly 30 national and international awards, including two Medals of Honor awarded by the Government of Bolivia, career awards from the Santa Cruz de la Sierra International Theater Festival and the Bertolt Brecht National Theater Festival, and her appointment as teacher of Latin American theater in Colombia.

=== Gender change ===
In May 2018, Diego Aramburo was legally recognized as a woman under Bolivia's Law 807 on Gender Identity. According to the artist – who made no changes to her body or name – the measure was adopted as "a way of fighting against the strict heteronormalization of Bolivian society" and "breaking with the cultural barriers around gender identity." The process that the artist went through to legalize her new identity was documented in Genero (2018), an expanded work of art made in co-production with Ecuador and Brazil and with the backing of Iberescena. Although she received the support of various personalities related to the arts, teaching, and activism, Aramburo was also the target of criticism for the action, sparking intense debate on the subject.

== Style ==
Diego Aramburo's works are framed within contemporary theater, with a strong influence of the visual and performing arts, and an interest in mixing different languages on stage. She used audiovisual projections – often recorded in real time – live music, and exploration of new technologies. Considered an innovative and transgressive director, especially for the canons of the Bolivian theater – which she frequently represents at international festivals, but moving away from the idea of "Bolivianity" understood as something folkloric, costumbrista, or autochthonous - Aramburo has a body of work in which it is possible to identify some recurring themes or concerns: sexuality, identity, ancestry, obscenity, Bolivian history, and vices and abuse of power.

== Selected works as director ==
- 1997: Tres fases de la luna
- 2003: Ese cuento del amor
- 2003: Raspando la cruz
- 2003: Tierra
- 2004: 4.48 Psychosis
- 2004: Amor de Dn. Perlimplín con Belisa en su jardín
- 2004: Crudo
- 2004: No hay cosa como callar
- 2005: A los que no me pueden ver
- 2005: Fábula del camaleón y la salamandra
- 2005: Fragmentos líquidos
- 2005: Gore
- 2006: Kiknteatr cuenta Pinocchio
- 2006: Pistolas verdes
- 2006: Withorwithoutme
- 2007: Happy Days
- 2007: Romeo y Julieta
- 2008: Ocho
- 2009: King Kong Palace (Argentina)
- 2009: La escala humana
- 2009: Macbett (Canada)
- 2009: Transparente
- 2010: La librería
- 2011: El preciso instante para no ser amado (Argentina)
- 2011: Medea ([Canada)
- 2011: MedeaMaterial
- 2011: Reflexión (performance)
- 2011: Texto M
- 2012: Aecceso
- 2012: Hamlet de los Andes
- 2012: Lisístrata (Ecuador)
- 2013: Romeo y Julieta de Aramburo
- 2014: 155 (y contando)
- 2014: Blancanieves
- 2014: Morales
- 2015: Hamlet (Dominican Republic)
- 2015: Hejarei
- 2015: La santa cruz de Sade
- 2015: Ukhupacha
- 2016: La casa de la fuerza
- 2017: Pornografía
- 2017: Scufita Rosie (Romania)
- 2018: Dios
- 2018: Genero

== Selected awards and recognition ==
- 1998: Peter Travesí National Theater Award for Tres fases de la luna
- 2000: Peter Travesí National Theater Award for Feroz
- 2002: Peter Travesí National Theater Award for Amataramarta
- 2003: Peter Travesí National Theater Award for Ese cuento del amor
- 2004: Peter Travesí National Theater Award for 4.48 Psychosis
- 2004: Peter Travesí National Theater Award for Crudo
- 2007: Bertolt Brecht National Award: Best Work, Direction, and Dramaturgy for Romeo y Julieta
- 2008: Bertolt Brecht National Award: Best Work, Direction, and Scenography for Happy Days
- 2011: Featec Awards, Córdoba, Argentina: Best Work, Direction, and Dramaturgy for El preciso instante para no ser amado
- 2013: Government of Bolivia: Medal of Honor for Merit
- 2013: Santa Cruz de la Sierra International Theater Festival: Career Award
- 2013: Bertolt Brecht National Festival: Career Award
- 2013: Peter Travesí National Theater Award for Aecceso
- 2014: World Theater Awards, Argentina: Major Award for Best Foreign Production for Hamlet de los Andes
- 2015: Peter Travesí National Theater Award for Morales
- 2016: Peter Travesí National Theater Award for Ukhupacha
- 2017: Eduardo Abaroa Plurinational Award for Morales
- 2018: Peter Travesí National Theater Award for Dios
- 2018: Eduardo Abaroa Plurinational Award for Genero
