= Ateneo Femenino =

Bolivian women's organization

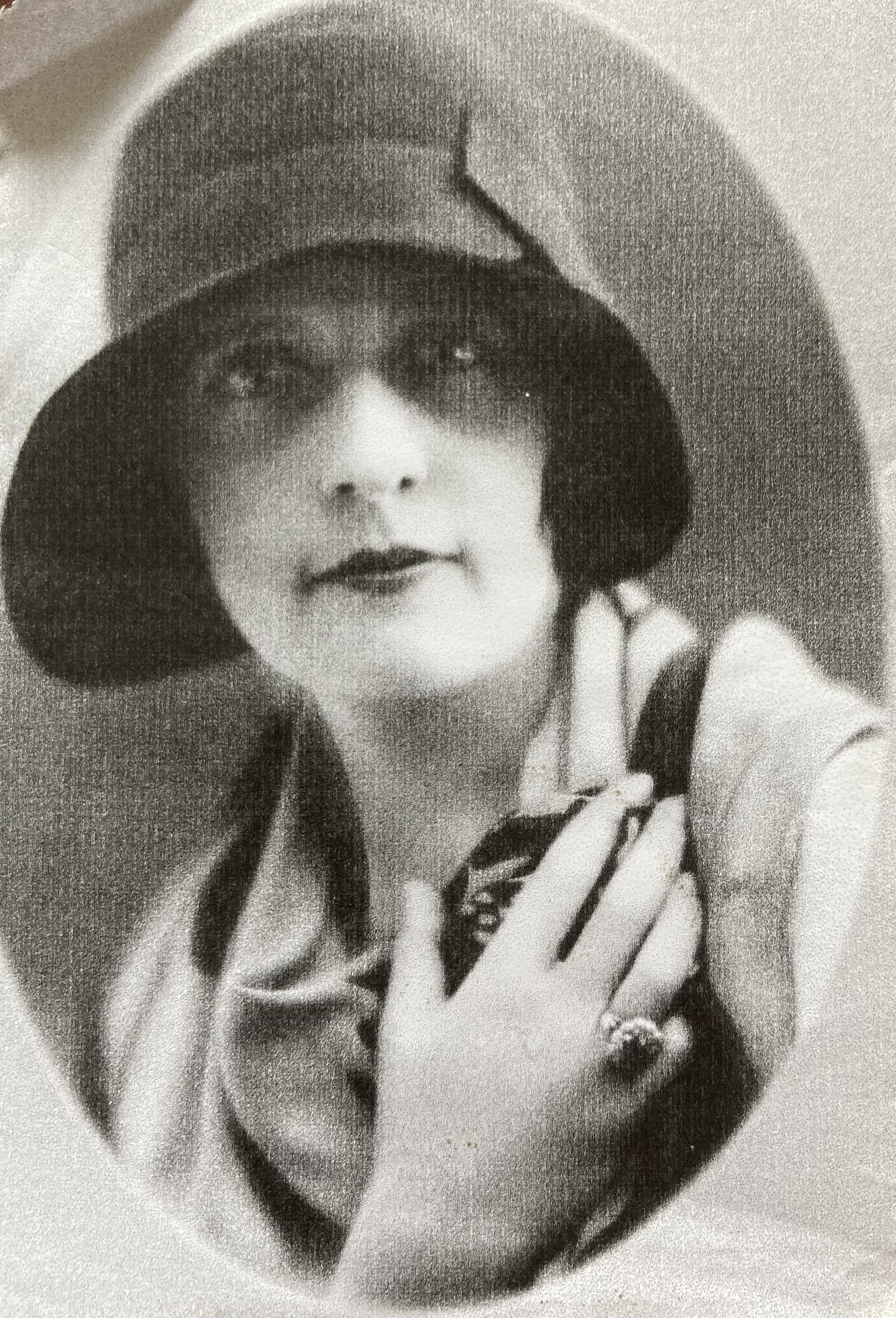
Maria Luisa Sánchez Bustamante

Ateneo Femenino was a women's organization in Bolivia, founded in 1923. It has been referred to as the first women's organization and the starting point of the organized women's movement in Bolivia, and played a leading role the campaign for women's suffrage in 1923-1952.

== History ==
Ateneo Femenino was founded in La Paz by María Luisa Sánchez Bustamante in 1923. In this time period, Bolivia was an extremely conservative society and few positions were accepted for women other than that of a wife-mother or a nun. Bolivia had no feminist movement, although the poet Adela Zamudio had acted as a feminist role model individually.

The Ateneo Femenino was founded by white upper-class women inspired by a similar organization in Chile. Its purpose was to work for women's rights and promote an intellectual life and a wider space in society for women. In the early 1930s, it was given a rival in the Legión Femenina de Educación Popular de América by Etelvina Villanueva y Saavedra, and for a long time they were the two leading women's organizations in Bolivia.

The Ateneo Femenino was, for a long time, not successful and met with compact opposition and a lack of understanding that women could aspire to anything but being a housewife. While women were granted the right to higher education in the 1920s, no other real changes in women's rights were made until the introduction of women's suffrage, and women's rights were regulated by the Civil Code of 1830 until 1976.

The Ateneo Femenino organized the First National Convention of Bolivian Women in 1929. After the Chaco War, the struggle for women's suffrage truly started. The suffrage movement were managed by the two women's organizations and mostly by personal requests made to influential males related to the suffragists. In 1936, however, the first public petition to the government was made by the feminist movement. In 1938, the parliament voted down the suggestion of women's suffrage with 55 to 31 votes. In 1945, the Ateneo Femenino sent their own representatives to the legislative Commission, and in September 1946 made another formal request. They supported the initial introduction of municipal suffrage in 1947, and encouraged women to register to vote, stand for office and vote for women candidates. They were not successful, since most Bolivian women at this time were conservative and the feminists were but a small educated elite minority.

Full (national) women's suffrage was finally granted in 1952.
