= Juan de Dios Bosque =

Bolivian Catholic bishop

His Excellency Juan de Dios Bosque DTh
- Bishop of La Paz
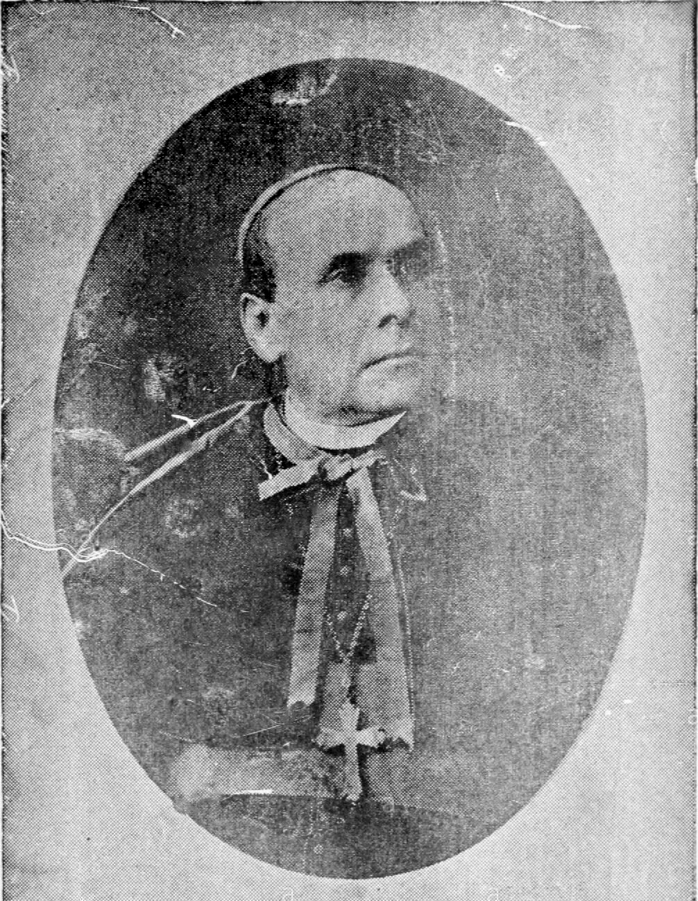
- Church: Roman Catholic Church
- See: Diocese of La Paz
- Appointed: 4 May 1874
- Installed: 26 October 1874
- Term ended: 9 March 1890
- Predecessor: Calixto Maria Clavijo Salazar
- Successor: Juan José Baldivia Morales
- Previous post: Priest

Orders
- Ordination: 13 September 1874 by José Puch y Solana
- Consecration: 24 August 1874 by José Puch y Solana

Personal details
- Born: Juan de Dios Bosque y Ventura Farfán; 12 March 1829 Sorata, La Paz, Bolivia
- Died: 9 March 1890 (aged 60) La Paz, Bolivia
- Spouse: Tomasa Flores y Guzmán
- Education: College of Sciences and Arts; Sorata Seminary; Higher University of San Andrés

Juan de Dios Bosque y Ventura Farfán (12 March 1829 – 9 March 1890) was a Bolivian prelate of the Catholic Church and politician who served as the acting president of Bolivia from the night of 27 November to 28 November 1873. He was preceded in this office by Agustín Morales and succeeded by Tomás Frías.

== Early life ==
Juan de Dios Bosque was born on 12 March 1829. His exact place of birth is unclear. The generally accepted story is that he was born in Sorata, Larecaja Province. However, others claim that he was born in either Aukapata or Ayata in the Muñecas Province and that as a baby he was later moved to Sorata. A third story states that Bosque was born in a town near Sorata, currently called Obispo Bosque.

Bosque studied at the College of Arts and Sciences in La Paz before returning to Sorata to continue his studies at the Seminary College, where he obtained a doctorate in theology. After that, he graduated as a lawyer from the Higher University of San Andrés.

On 22 April 1854, Bosque was ordained a deacon; the next day, a priest. Following that he dedicated himself fully to serving as an instructor, being appointed professor of Theology and Canon Law of the Sorata Seminary from 1854 to 1865. He also served as rector from 1858 to 1860. In 1865, Bosque held the canonry in the city's Cathedral. During this time, he founded the Society of Charity for women and the Saint Vincent de Paul Society for men.

== Political career ==
In 1872, Bosque became a Deputy for Larecaja to that year's National Assembly and was elected president of the body on 18 November. Not long into his term on 27 November, President Agustín Morales was shot by his nephew during a physical quarrel at 9:15 p.m. The following day, President of the Council of State Tomás Frías assumed office as president. Some sources list Bosque as "Acting President of Bolivia" from the night of the 27th to the 28th. Why some texts include Bosque and others omit him is unclear, though it is possibly due to the fact that executive power was transferred to him automatically as president of the assembly and not through formal inauguration.

On 27 January 1873, President Frías appointed Bosque Minister of Justice, Instruction, and Worship. He remains the sole religious official to perform ministerial functions in the history of Bolivia. He held the post until 9 May 1873.

== Bishop of La Paz ==
On 4 May 1874, Bosque was appointed Bishop of La Paz. He was consecrated on 24 August and ordained bishop on 13 September by Archbishop José Puch y Solana of Sucre, before being installed at the Diocese of La Paz on 26 October 1874.

He served until his death on 9 March 1890.

== Bibliography ==
- Aranzaes, Nicanor (8 January 2018). Diccionario Histórico del Departamento de la Paz: Expedientes Matrimoniales, Libros de Bautizos, Archivos Oficiales É Historiadores Contemporáneos Consultados (Classic Reprint) (in Spanish). Fb&c Limited. ISBN 978-0-428-57755-1.
- Gisbert, Carlos D. Mesa (2003). Presidentes de Bolivia: entre urnas y fusiles : el poder ejecutivo, los ministros de estado (in Spanish). Editorial Gisbert.

Political offices
Preceded by Tomás Frías	President of the National Assembly; 1872–1873	Succeeded by José Manuel del Carpio
Preceded by Agustín Morales	President of Bolivia; Acting; 1872	Succeeded by Tomás Frías
Preceded by Melchor Terrázas	Minister of Justice, Instruction, and Worship; 1873	Succeeded by Daniel Calvo
Catholic Church titles
Preceded by Calixto Maria Clavijo Salazar	Bishop of La Paz; 1874–1890	Succeeded by Juan José Baldivia Morales
