= Emilio Fernández Costas =

Prefect of Potosí
- In office 9 February 1880 – 5 April 1880
- President: Narciso Campero
- Preceded by: Modesto Omiste Tinajeros
- Succeeded by: Rufino Vásquez
- In office 28 December 1885 – 17 December 1886
- President: Gregorio Pacheco
- Preceded by: Samuel Achá
- Succeeded by: José Manuel Rendón

Personal details
- Born: Emilio Fernández Costas; June 21, 1827 La Paz, Upper Peru, Viceroyalty of the Río de la Plata
- Died: 1908 Sucre, Bolivia
- Spouse: Bailona Molina Frías
- Children: 8
- Parent(s): Gregorio Fernández Cuello; Bailona Costas Frías
- Education: University of San Francisco Xavier
- Occupation: Lawyer, politician

Emilio Fernández Costas (21 June 1827 – c.1908) was a Bolivian lawyer and politician who served twice as Prefect of the Potosí Department and once as Prefect of the Litoral Department. He also served as a congressman in the National Assembly, representing the Province of Azero in the Chuquisaca Department.

== Biography ==
He was born in La Paz, Bolivia, on 21 June 1827, the son of General Gregorio Fernández Cuello and Pascuala Bailona Costas Frías. He was baptized on the same day in the Church of San Agustín in La Paz, with Dr. José Antonio Díez de Medina and Gregoria Nieto serving as his godparents. At the time of his birth, his father was Prefect of the La Paz Department.

His father was a veteran of the Spanish American Wars of Independence, having fought in numerous engagements, including the battles of Junín, Salta, and Huaqui. His mother belonged to a distinguished family from Salta, which relocated to Potosí during the Argentine War of Independence.

Fernández studied law at the University of San Francisco Xavier of Chuquisaca, where he earned his Doctorate in Law in 1864. He was admitted to the profession under license number 1173, as recorded in the university's official register of law graduates.

After his graduation, Fernández held various bureaucratic posts in the city of Sucre, where he exercised considerable influence and was regarded as one of the city's distinguished citizens. In 1875, he was appointed Prefect of the Litoral Department. On 16 January 1875, a rebellion broke out in Cobija, proclaiming General Quintín Quevedo as Supreme Leader of Bolivia. Fernández was subsequently replaced by the collaborator Raimundo Taborga.

Fernández issued orders for his forces to take up positions in the vicinity of La Chimba, and on 27 January the rebels occupied the main plaza of Antofagasta. Juan de Dios Ribera assumed leadership of the revolution in Cobija after government authorities were completely expelled from the region.

However, upon learning of Quevedo's defeat at Chacoma on 18 January, the insurgents submitted to the government and requested guarantees. The government granted their request and permitted them to leave the country. By 3 February, the ringleaders had fled to Iquique, and when General Hilarión Daza arrived, he found the Litoral completely pacified.

After being succeeded by General Claudio Acosta, Fernández returned to Sucre. Four years later, in 1880, he was appointed Interim Prefect of the Potosí Department, succeeding Modesto Omiste. His tenure was brief and ended upon the arrival of Rufino Vásquez, who formally assumed the post. Fernández again held the prefecture in 1885, this time succeeding Samuel Achá. He was succeeded the following year by General José Manuel Rendón.

In 1893, he served as Deputy for the province of Azero (now Luis Calvo Province), representing the district during the constitutional reforms carried out that year under President Mariano Baptista.

== Family ==
He married Bailona Molina Frías on 15 July 1854 in the Church of San Miguel Arcángel in Sucre. Bailona was the daughter of the revolutionary and politician Manuel Molina Zamudio and Carmen Frías Amatller, the younger sister of President Tomás Frías.

Together they had the following children:

- María Etelvina Fernández Molina, baptized on 4 July 1855 in the Church of Santo Domingo, Sucre.
- Manuel Emilio Fernández Molina, baptized on 14 May 1856 in the Church of Santo Domingo, Sucre.
- Gregorio Carlos Lucas Fernández Molina, baptized on 18 October 1858 in the Church of Santo Domingo, Sucre.
- Justa Fernández Molina, born in 1860; she married David Santa Cruz Mallabia, with whom she had issue.
- Benigna Fernández Molina, baptized on 6 September 1862 in the Church of Santo Domingo, Sucre.
- Mercedes Fernández Molina, baptized on 10 October 1864 in the Church of Santo Domingo, Sucre.
- Emilio Luis Fernández Molina, born on 28 March 1867 in Sucre; he married María Catalina Corina Urioste Arana.
- María Benigna Cristina Fernández Molina, born on 23 July 1870 in Sucre; she married Agustín Viaña, with whom she had issue.
