= Iskanwaya =

Archaeological site in Bolivia

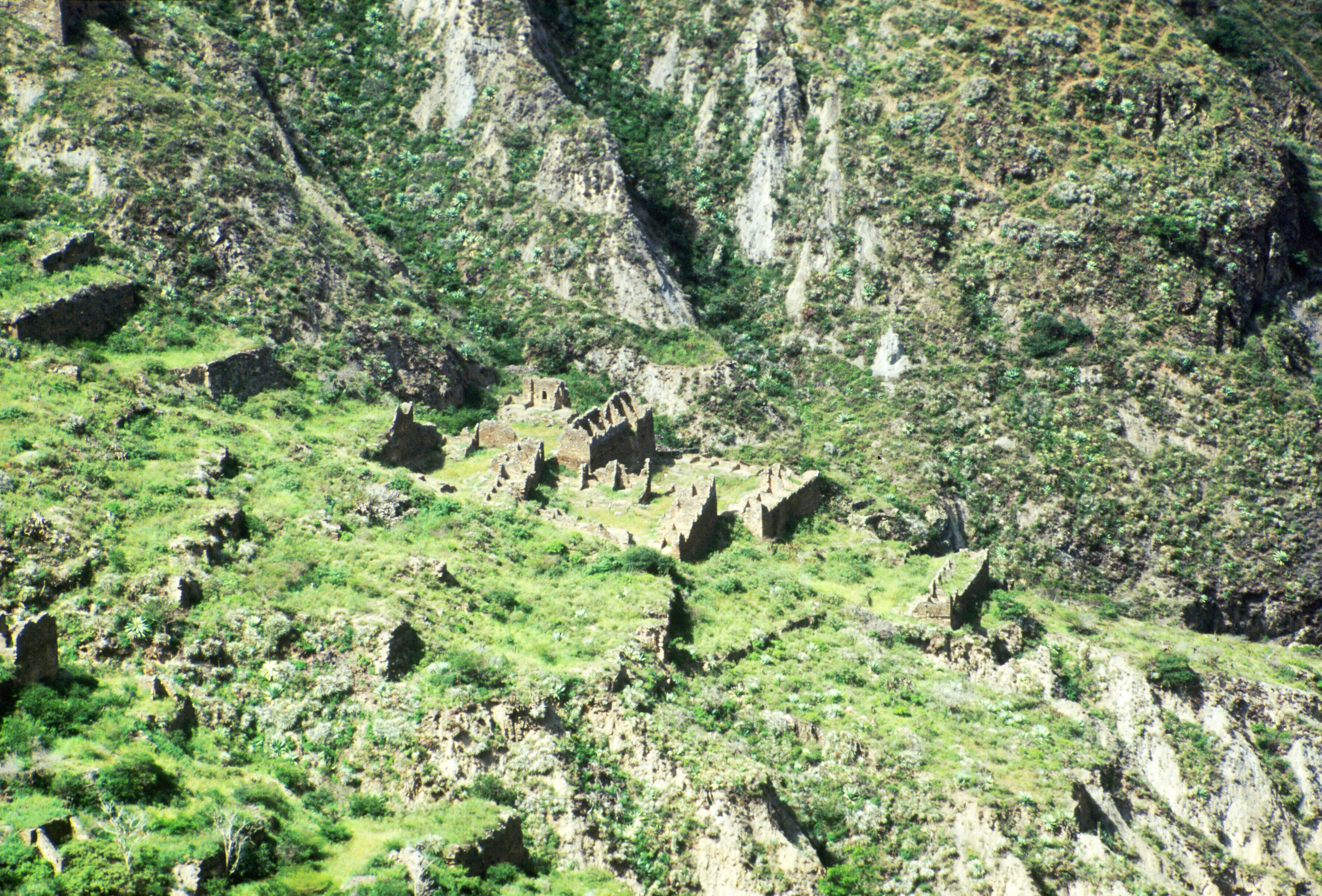
- Iskanwaya
- Interactive map of Iskanwaya
- 15.48655800°S 68.67428500°W
- Location: Bolivia, La Paz Department, Muñecas Province, Aucapata Municipality
- Region: Altiplano

Iskanwaya is a pre-Columbian sacred site, situated on a mountain ridge above the Llica River in Bolivia, 325 km north of La Paz. In its extension and its age Iskanwaya surpasses Machu Picchu in Peru, but it is less well preserved.

== Location ==
The sacred site of Iskanwaya is found on the edge of the Cordillera Real, 250 m above the River Llica canyon and 1,672 meters above sea level. The site is located near Aucapata, a small town in the Muñecas Province, on the northern side of the Andean cordilleras.

== Site ==
The site is considered sacred by the inhabitants of the area, and one of the most important areas in the country; both for its monuments, location, and relationship between the cultures that inhabited the inter-Andean valleys.

In March 2022, in order to preserve its heritage and reactivate the economy through tourism in the region, the site was inaugurated as an archeological project of restoration and tourist attraction by Governor Santos Quispe in coordination with the Departmental Secretariat of Tourism and Cultures.

The city of Iskanwaya was built on two platforms on an area of 0.6 square kilometers and was notable for its running water provided by a network of irrigation canals. The irrigation system brought water from the Naranjani stream through canals and was distributed to the agglutinated Iskanwaya dwelling groups. Additionally, archeological evidence of water reservoirs located at the centre of the main court square have been discovered. More than one hundred large buildings composed of stone masonry and an average of thirteen rooms have survived. Mollo streets ran in east–west direction. Their houses were rectangular and grouped around patios, they were built with blocks of slate stone, joined with mud trench mortars.

Agriculture patterns included terracing and irrigation.

UN-archaeologist Alvaro R. Fernholz Jemio suggests that in its time the site was inhabited by 2,500 to 3.000 people

== Mollo Culture ==
The Iskanwaya ruins go back to the Mollo culture which predated the Inca civilization and whose people presumably built the constructions as early as 800 BC or in their prime cultural period from 1145 to 1425.
