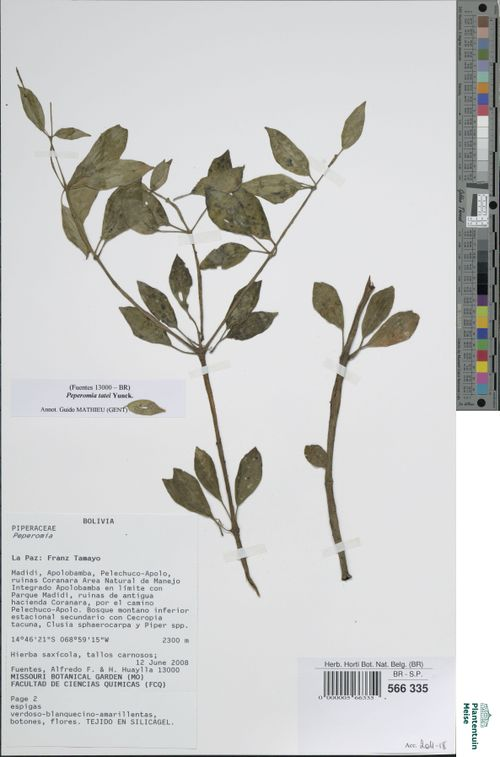

Scientific classification
- Kingdom: Plantae
- Clade: Tracheophytes
- Clade: Angiosperms
- Clade: Magnoliids
- Order: Piperales
- Family: Piperaceae
- Genus: Peperomia
- Species: P. tatei

Binomial name
- Peperomia tatei Yunck.

= Peperomia tatei =

Species of flowering plant

Peperomia tatei is a species of flowering plant in the genus Peperomia. It was first described by Truman G. Yuncker and published in the book "Linnaea 37: 380–381. 1871-1873[1872]. (Jul 1872)". The species name came from George Henry Hamilton Tate, where first specimens of this species were collected.

== Distribution ==
It is endemic to Bolivia. First specimens where found at an altitude of 2400 meters in Nequejahuira.

- Bolivia
  - Chuquisaca
  - La Paz
    - Frans Tamayo
    - Muñecas
    - Nequejahuira
  - Santa Cruz
