= Chajlaya =

Coordinates: 15.5456°S 68.9403°W

- Town
- Interactive map of Chajlaya
- Country: Bolivia
- Department: La Paz Department
- Province: Muñecas Province
- Municipality: Chuma Municipality
- Time zone: UTC-4 (BOT)

Chajlaya is a small town in Bolivia. In 2009 it had an estimated population of 819.
