= Aleta Baun =

Indonesian environmentalist

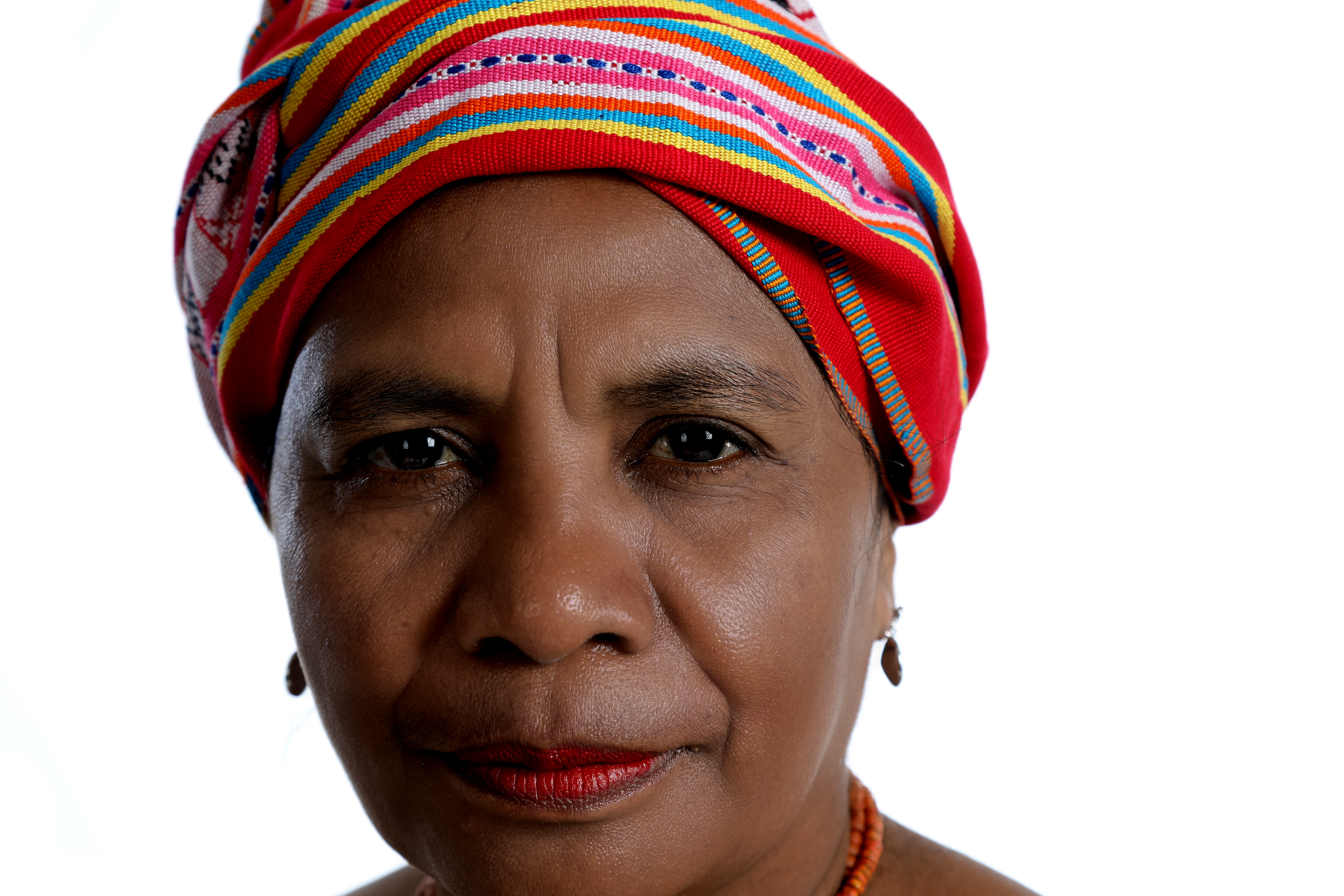
- Born: Indonesia
- Education: Universitas Tritunggal Surabaya
- Known for: environmental activist

Aleta Baun is an Indonesian environmental activist. She has been described as the Indonesian Avatar.

She won the 2013 Goldman Environmental Prize for organizing hundreds of local villagers to peacefully occupy marble mining sites in “weaving protests,” to stop destruction of sacred forest land on Mutis Mountain on the island of Timor.

== Biography ==
A leader of indigenous Mollo people, she was born to a family of farmers. Having lost her mother at a young age, she was raised by other women and elders in the village who taught her to respect the environment as a source of their spiritual identity and livelihood. As a community leader sharing traditional knowledge, she eventually became known as “Mama Aleta.”

Mama Aleta's work made her a target for the mining interests and local authorities, who put a price on her head. After surviving an assassination attempt, Mama Aleta went into hiding in the forest with her baby.

Despite intimidation, Mama Aleta grew the movement to include hundreds of villagers. It culminated in a weaving occupation where 150 women spent a year sitting on the marble rocks at the mining site, quietly weaving their traditional cloth in protest. Because women were traditionally responsible for getting food, dye and medicine from the mountains, mining in these mountains would have directly impacted their livelihoods. While the women protested at the mine, the men provided domestic support at home, cooking, cleaning and caring for the children.

In the face of the villagers’ peaceful and sustained presence, marble mining became an increasingly untenable endeavor for the companies involved. Public awareness of the weaving occupation was growing, and Indonesian government officials took notice. By 2010, the mining companies, reacting to the pressure, halted mining at all four sites within the Mollo territories and abandoned their operations.

Mama Aleta now helps communities across West Timor to map their traditional forests. She works in water security and indigenous peoples natural resource management and land rights. She said to the Jakarta Post: “We especially want to conserve the upstream region of our territory because it is a watershed for the entire island. We are considering a joint title for our three communities and placing the land under collective ownership of the communities”. To help with this, she obtained a law degree in 2011 from Universitas Tritunggal Surabaya.

In 2014, Aleta Baun was elected as a member of the regional council (regional parliament) in East Nusa Tenggara. According to the advocacy group Peace Women Across the Globe (PWAG) activist Olin Monteiro, Baun founded an anti-mining organization and has promoted weaving with more environmentally friendly, natural yarns.
