= Manuel Molina =

Manuel Molina may refer to:

- Manuel Molina Zamudio (1788–1868), Bolivian revolutionary and politician
- Manuel Molina Solís (1891–1926), Mexican lawyer and politician, brother of Olegario Molina
- Manuel Molina Jiménez (1948–2015), Spanish flamenco guitarist, member of the duo Lole y Manuel

== See also ==
- Manuel de Molina (c.1620–1660), Spanish baroque painter, listed in An account of the lives and works of the most eminent Spanish painters, sculptors and architects
