= Chuma Municipality =

- Municipality
- Location of the Chuma Municipality within Bolivia
- Coordinates: 15°30′0″S 68°55′0″W
- Country: Bolivia
- Department: La Paz Department
- Province: Muñecas Province
- Seat: Chuma

Government
  - Mayor: Alejandro Avila Rada (2007)
  - President: Hugo Simon Mamani Laura (2007)

Area
  - Total: 230 sq mi (590 km^{2})
- Elevation: 8,200 ft (2,500 m)

Population (2001)
  - Total: 12,874
- Time zone: UTC-4 (BOT)

Chuma Municipality is the first municipal section of the Muñecas Province in the La Paz Department, Bolivia. Its seat is Chuma. Another populated place is Chajlaya.
