= Aucapata Municipality =

Aucapata Awqapata
- Municipality
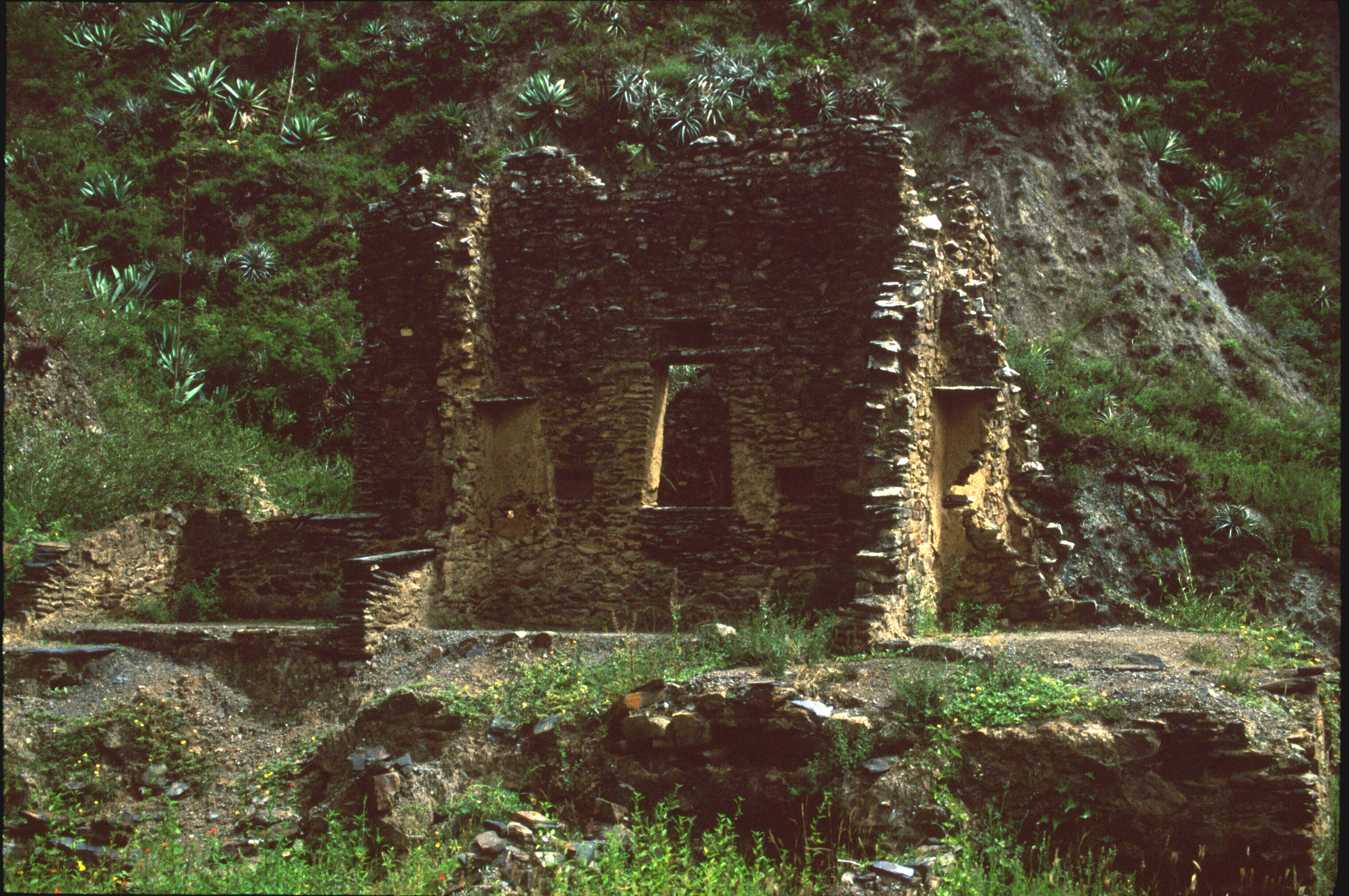
- Ruins at the archaeological site of Iskanwaya in the Aucapata Municipality

- Location of the Aucapata Municipality within Bolivia
- Coordinates: 15°25′0″S 68°40′0″W
- Country: Bolivia
- Department: La Paz Department
- Province: Muñecas Province
- Seat: Aucapata

Population (2001)
  - Total: 4.146
- Time zone: UTC-4 (BOT)

Aucapata Municipality is municipality of the Muñecas Province in the La Paz Department, Bolivia. Its capital is Aucapata.

== Languages ==
The languages spoken in the Aucapata Municipality are mainly Quechua, Spanish and Aymara.

Language	Inhabitants
Quechua	3,521
Aymara	1,071
Guaraní	3
Another native	3
Spanish	1,758
Foreign	4
Only native	2,156
Native and Spanish	1,620
Only Spanish	138

== Places of interest ==
- Iskanwaya
