= Mollo culture =

Andean civilization during the period of AD 1000 to 1500

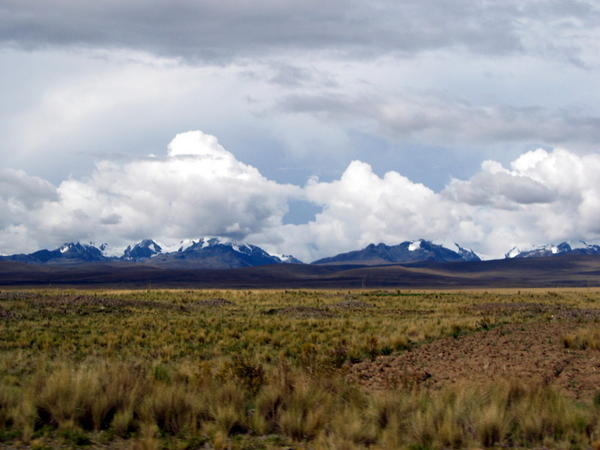
The peaks of the Cordillera Real as seen from the Bolivian Altiplano.

The Mollo culture existed in Bolivia's altiplano area after the collapse of the Tiwanaku culture during the period of AD 1000 to 1500; it predated the Inca civilization. While the Mollo showed a continuity with Late Tiwanaku culture in both domestic and village architecture, they left no pyramids. Mollo worshiped the jaguar.

== Archaeology ==
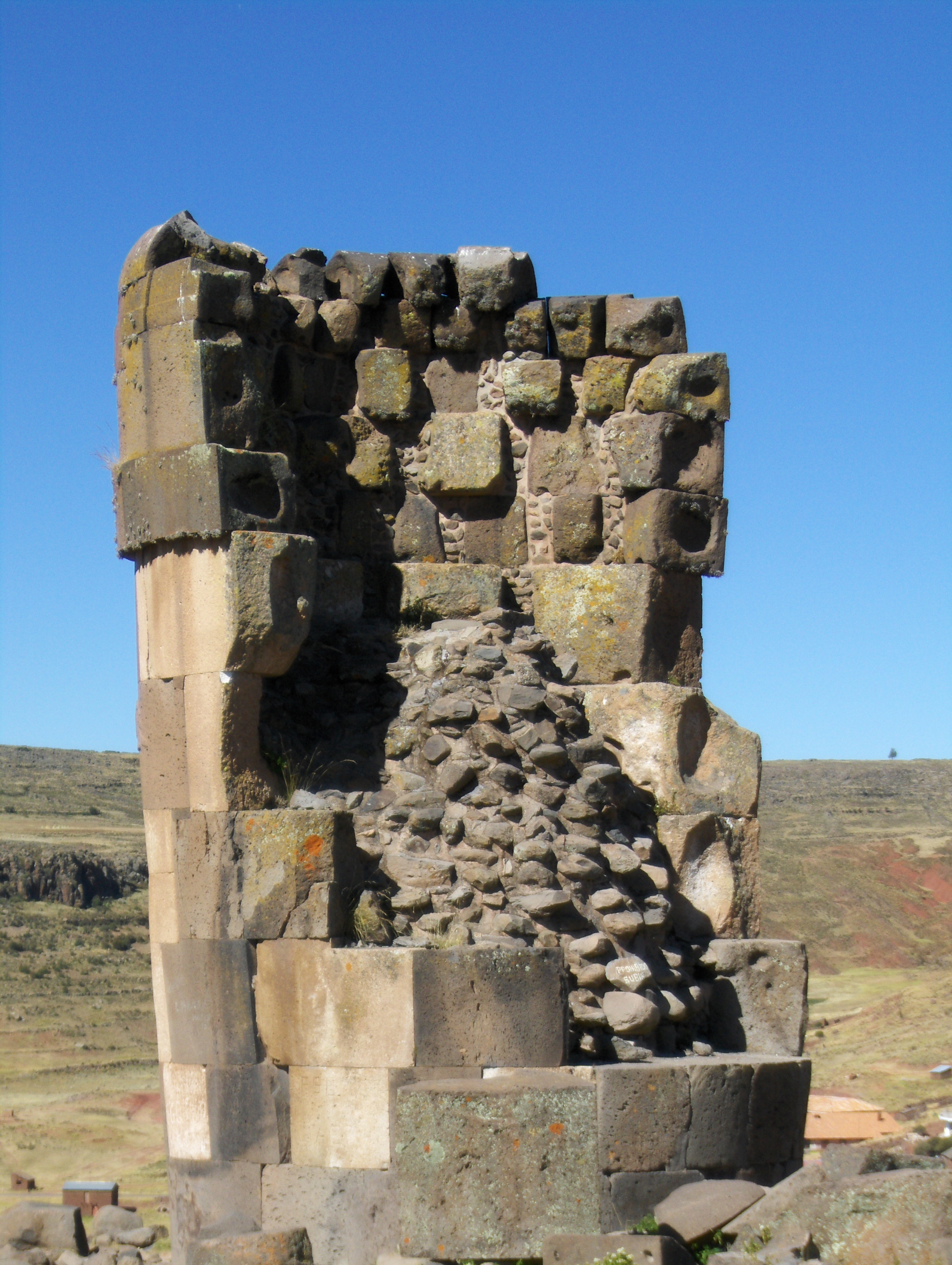
A chullpa near Lake Titicaca, Peru.

One of the best representations of the Mollo are the ruins northeast of Lake Titicaca at Iskanwaya, on the Cordillera Real, 250 metres (820 ft) above the Rio Llica (15°21′S 68°32′W). Iskanwaya, in Muñecas Province, is 325 kilometres (202 mi) from La Paz, Bolivia. Dated from 1145 to 1425, the city was built on platforms and was notable for its running water. More than one hundred buildings, streets and plazas still survive. Mollo streets ran in east-west direction. Their houses were rectangular and grouped around patios. Agriculture patterns included terracing and irrigation.

Other Mollo sites, such as Piniqo and Khargi, exhibit the same settlement characteristics as Iskanwaya, Wamán is an old agricultural establishment with the same terracing pattern. The present-day village of Charazani includes Mollo archaeological sites as the ruins of Mallku Janalaya.

== Ethnography ==
Kallawaya people, an itinerant group of healers, were of the Mollo culture.

The Mollo were defined by their ceramics. Shoe pots, grave pots, vases, and dipping vessels have been found and these are either plain or painted black and white on red clay. They created a unique drinking cup with a built-in straw. Some of these ceramics can be found today as far away as the Náprstek Museum in Prague.

Burials were of single adults placed in chullpa funerary towers of stone or adobe, while infant skeletons are found in tombs beneath house floors.
