= Chuma, La Paz =

Chuma
- Town
- Location within Bolivia
- Coordinates: 15°29′S 68°49′W
- Country: Bolivia
- Department: La Paz Department
- Province: Muñecas Province
- Municipality: Chuma Municipality

Population (2001)
  - Total: 392
- Time zone: UTC-4 (BOT)

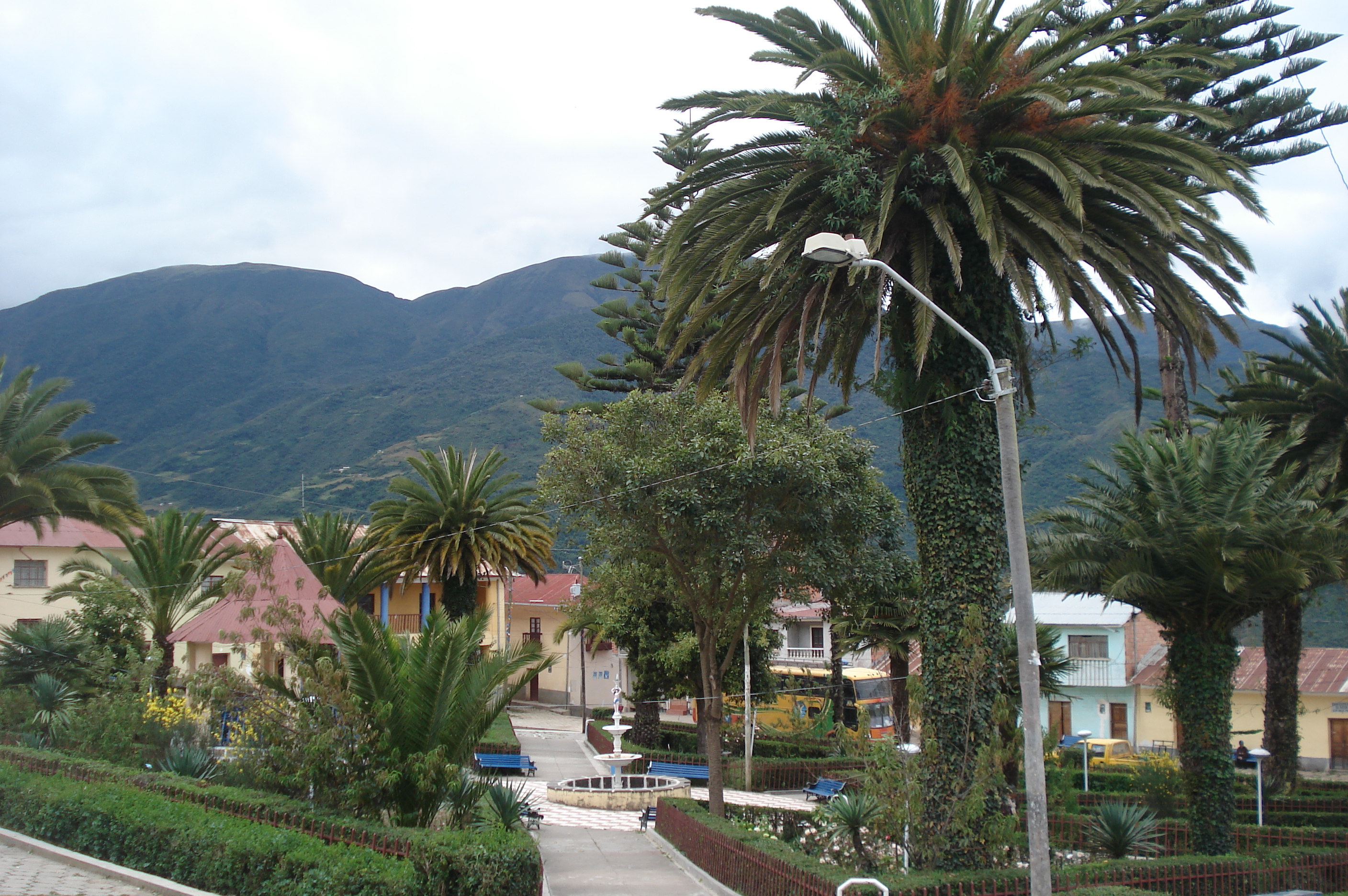

Chuma is a location in the La Paz Department of Bolivia. It is the seat of the Chuma Municipality, the first municipal section of the Muñecas Province and of the province.
