= Dámaso Bilbao la Vieja =

Bolivian military officer (1789–1869)

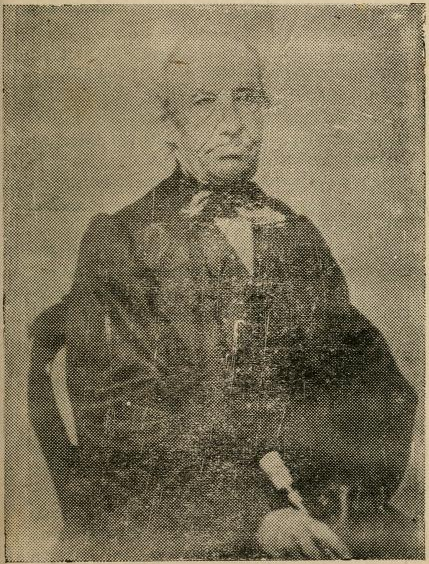

Prefect of the La Paz Department
- In office 3 November 1828 – 27 December 1828
- Preceded by: Anselmo Rivas
- Succeeded by: Pedro Arze
- In office 26 July 1829 – 15 December 1829
- Preceded by: Pedro Arze
- Succeeded by: Mariano Torrelio

Member of the Chamber of Deputies Representing La Paz
- In office 10 May 1832 – 2 October 1832
- Preceded by: Juan Bautista de Asin
- Succeeded by: Gregorio de Lara

Personal details
- Born: Dámaso Bilbao la Vieja Alquinza; December 11, 1789 La Paz, Bolivia
- Died: June 28, 1869 La Paz, Bolivia
- Spouse: María de los Dolores Ramos Mexia Ross
- Children: 5
- Parent(s): Antonio Bilbao la Vieja de Rojas; Francisca Alquiza Foronda

Military service
- Allegiance: Bolivia; United Provinces of the Río de la Plata
- Branch/service: Bolivian Army; Argentine Army
- Rank: Brigadier general (Bolivia); Lieutenant colonel (Argentina)
- Battles/wars: Spanish American wars of independence; War of the Confederation; Peruvian–Bolivian War of 1841–42

Dámaso Bilbao la Vieja Alquiza (11 December 1789 – 28 June 1869) was a Bolivian military officer who participated in the Spanish American wars of independence, War of the Confederation, and the Peruvian–Bolivian War of 1841–42. He came from a long line of Spanish and colonial aristocrats, belonging to one of the most belonging to one of the most wealthy families in the Viceroyalty of Peru. Bilbao would serve as Prefect of La Paz, in 1828 and 1829; as a congressman representing La Paz in the Chamber of Deputies, during the National Assembly of 1832; as Prefect of Chuquisaca in 1842; as Prefect of Potosi in 1844; and as Commander-General of La Paz in 1862.

== Early life ==
He was born in the city of La Paz on December 11, 1789. He was the legitimate son of the Spanish colonel, Don Antonio Bilbao la Vieja de Rojas and Doña Francisca Alquiza Foronda. The noble title of 'La Vieja' was obtained from the Spanish crown; however, he never used it because he sympathized with republicanism. His father was known to be one of the wealthiest men in Upper Peru, owning haciendas, mills, mines, and several buildings in the cities of La Paz, Sucre, Potosí, and Cochabamba. By 1830, Bilbao la Vieja was estimated to have been worth well over 3,000,000 pesos, making him one of the richest people in the Americas.

== Wars of Independence ==
On July 16, 1808, he enlisted as a cadet in the militias of the Spanish army. A year later, on the same day, July 16, he assisted the patriots in taking the barracks and proclaimed the independence of the Americas. The next day, he was promoted to the rank of second lieutenant. He participated in the Combat of Chacaltaya, unfortunate for the patriots, and the victorious General José Manuel de Goyeneche exiled him to Córdoba for four years.

There, he served under the Argentine General Juan Martín de Puyrredón, who promoted him to the rank of captain in 1811. He was part of the three Argentine expeditions in Upper Peru and took part in all the battles and combats that occurred from 1811 to 1817: Huaqui, Las Piedras, Tucumán, Salta, Suipacha, Vilcapugio, Ayuma, Sipesipe. At Sipesipe, he showed great courage and valiant behavior. On May 25, 1813, he was promoted to the rank of lieutenant colonel by the government of the United Provinces of the Río de la Plata. He served in the Argentine army for thirteen years, and in 1825, when the war of independence ended, he returned to his homeland with General José María Pérez de Urdininea.

== Military career ==
In Bolivia, he held multiple positions, both military and administrative, excelling in all of them with true diligence and competence. He earned honorable recommendations from his superiors. First as the chief Intendant of La Paz, then as the Governor of the province of Yungas, later as the head of the National Guard, and finally, as the commander-in-chief, Bilbao La Vieja dedicated his career to the army.

In 1826, he was elected deputy to the constituent congress convened in Chuquisaca. In 1829, he was appointed aide-de-camp to President Andrés de Santa Cruz, and alongside him participated in the campaigns of the Peru-Bolivian Confederation, taking part in the Battles of Yanacocha, Ninabamba, Socabaya, Paucarpata, and Yungay. After the defeat in Yungay on January 20, 1839, he was taken prisoner and transported to Cuzco, where he remained until July of the following year when, having obtained his freedom, he returned to his homeland.

During the government of General José Miguel de Velasco, he was the Prefect of La Paz, a member of the war council, and the head of the national guard. In September 1841, the people of La Paz appointed him commander-in-chief of the garrison of that city, following the political change that proclaimed his nephew, General José Ballivián, as president of the republic. Ballivián appointed him chief aide-de-camp of the General Staff, and in this capacity, he participated in the 40-day campaign against Peru and fought in the Battle of Ingavi on November 18, 1841. For his part, Bilbao La Vieja was promoted to the rank of brigadier general. He received the commemorative medal for this battle and was declared a hero of the country.

He participated in the 1842 campaign in Peru as the commander-in-chief of a division. In the same year and the following ones, he successively held the position of Prefect in the departments of Chuquisaca (succeeding General Gregorio Fernández), Potosí, and Oruro; a member of the national council, commander-in-chief of the infantry brigade, and other important positions in various departments of the republic. In 1855, he was instrumental defeating the uprising of General Gregorio Pérez, securing the presidency of Jorge Córdova.

== Marriage and family ==
Bilbao la Vieja married María de los Dolores Ramos Mexia Ross on December 8, 1814. The couple had five children:

- María de la Concepción Bilbao la Vieja Ramos Mejia (18 December 1815 – 5 February 1840); married to Juan José Sánchez Boado Romero, they had two children:
  - José Gregorio Sánchez Boado Bilbao de la Vieja (1 December 1835 –18 May 1838)
  - Francisca Sánchez Boado Bilbao la Vieja (18 August 1837 – 12 February 1839)
- Casilda Bilbao la Vieja Ramos Mejía (9 April 1818 – 1 January 1890); married to Juan José Sánchez Boado Romero, her sister's widower, and had six children:
  - Martín Leonardo del Corazón de Jesús Sánchez Boado Bilbao la Vieja (5 December 1842 – 2 February 1901)
  - Juan José Alejandro Sánchez Boado Bilbao la Vieja (17 March 1845 – 17 May 1849)
  - Carmen Segunda Sánchez Boado Bilbao la Vieja (17 July 1847 – 14 June 1889)
  - Eduardo Sánchez Boado Bilbao la Vieja (4 August 1851 – 29 March 1909)
  - Tomás Julián Sánchez Boado Bilbao la Vieja (13 August 1853 – 1 December 1890)
  - Pedro Augusto Sánchez Boado Bilbao la Vieja (29 January 1856 – 20 April 1866)
- Antonio Mamerto Bilbao la Vieja Ramos Mejía (11 May 1821 – 24 November 1884); married to Edelmira Bartola Giménez Rodríguez, they had seven children:
  - María Paula Bilbao la Vieja Giménez (13 January 1846 – 21 May 1849)
  - Antonio Gervasio Bilbao la Vieja Giménez (19 June 1848 – 20 February 1911)
  - Santiago Ernesto Bilbao la Vieja Giménez (24 July 1850 – 6 November 1850)
  - Eudoxio Rodolfo Bilbao la Vieja Giménez (2 November 1852 – 30 April 1914)
  - Enrique Bilbao la Vieja Giménez (8 November 1857 – 21 July 1889)
  - Rosa Bilbao la Vieja Giménez (23 March 1860 – 2 December 1860)
  - Martín Hipólito Ricardo Bilbao la Vieja Giménez (30 January 1866 – 10 December 1929)
- Dolores Patricia Bilbao la Vieja Ramos Mejía (17 March 1823 – 2 July 1885); she never married.
- Juana Rosa Bilbao la Vieja Ramos Mejía (29 August 1825 – 8 September 1857)

== Final years and death ==
During the governments of Manuel Isidoro Belzu and Jorge Córdova, he was out of service for not being a supporter of these rulers. Although Córdova did call him on two occasions to put down revolutions across the country. José María Linares fully reinstated him in 1857, as Bilbao la Vieja played a crucial role in ousting the belcistas. Leading a major uprising in Cochabamba, Bilbao La Vieja captured the city and placed it into Linares’ command. During the presidency of General José María de Achá, he held the position of commander-in-chief of the La Paz garrison, the last public office he held, as he requested and obtained his retirement in 1865. Bilbao La Vieja died in La Paz on June 28, 1869, in his own home.
