= Modesto Omiste Province =

Modesto Omiste
- Province
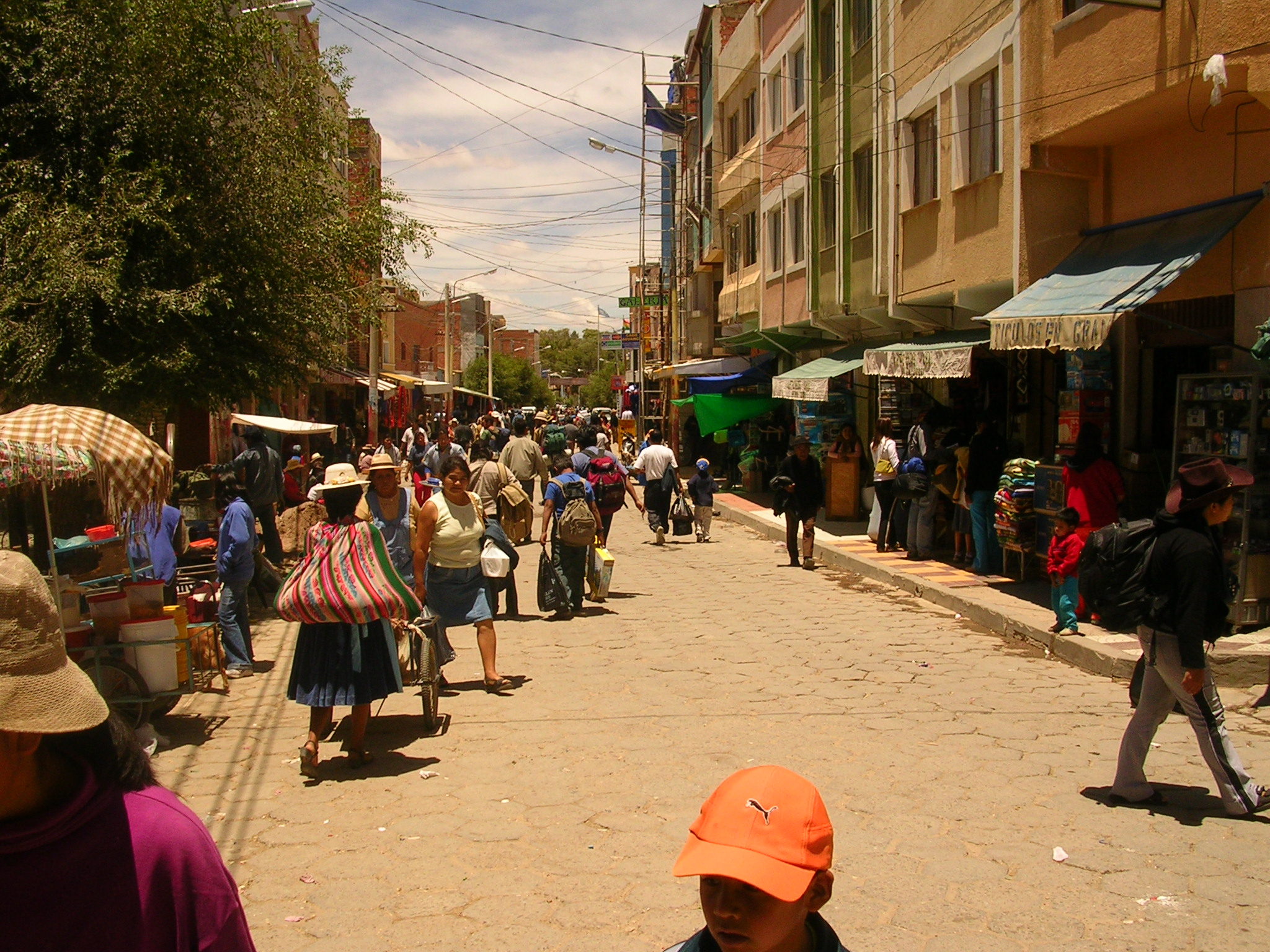
- A street in Villazón

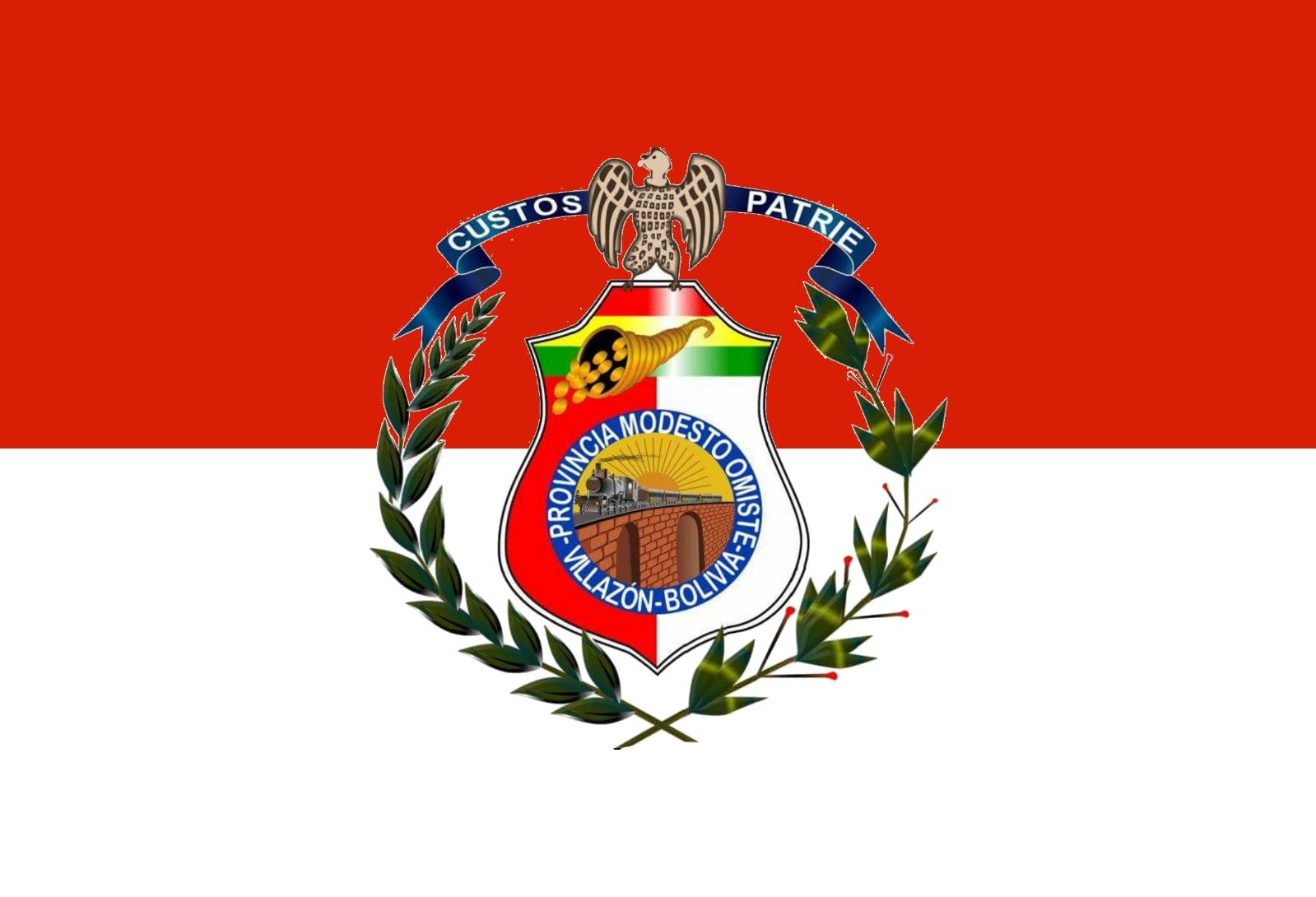
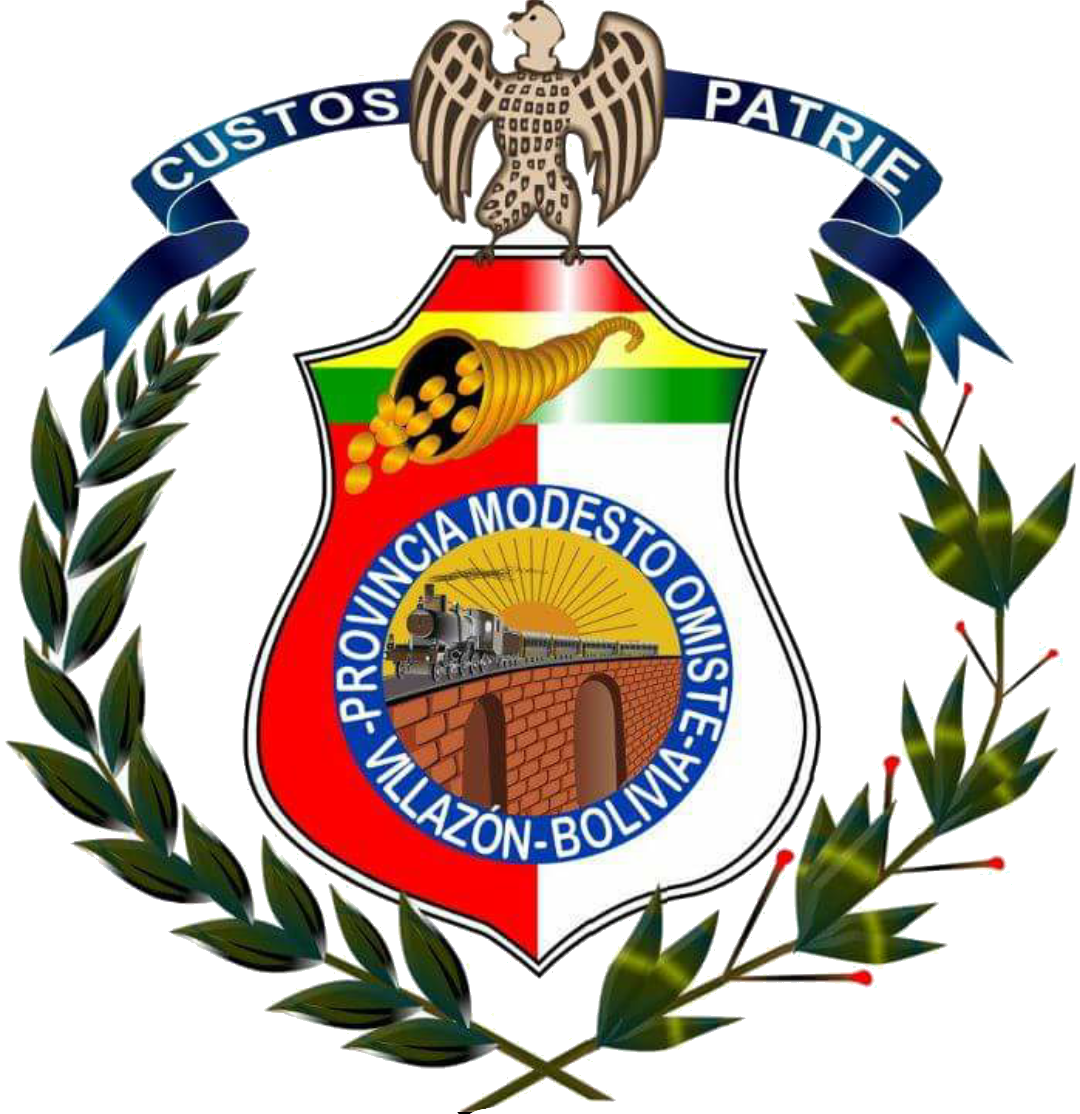
- Flag Seal

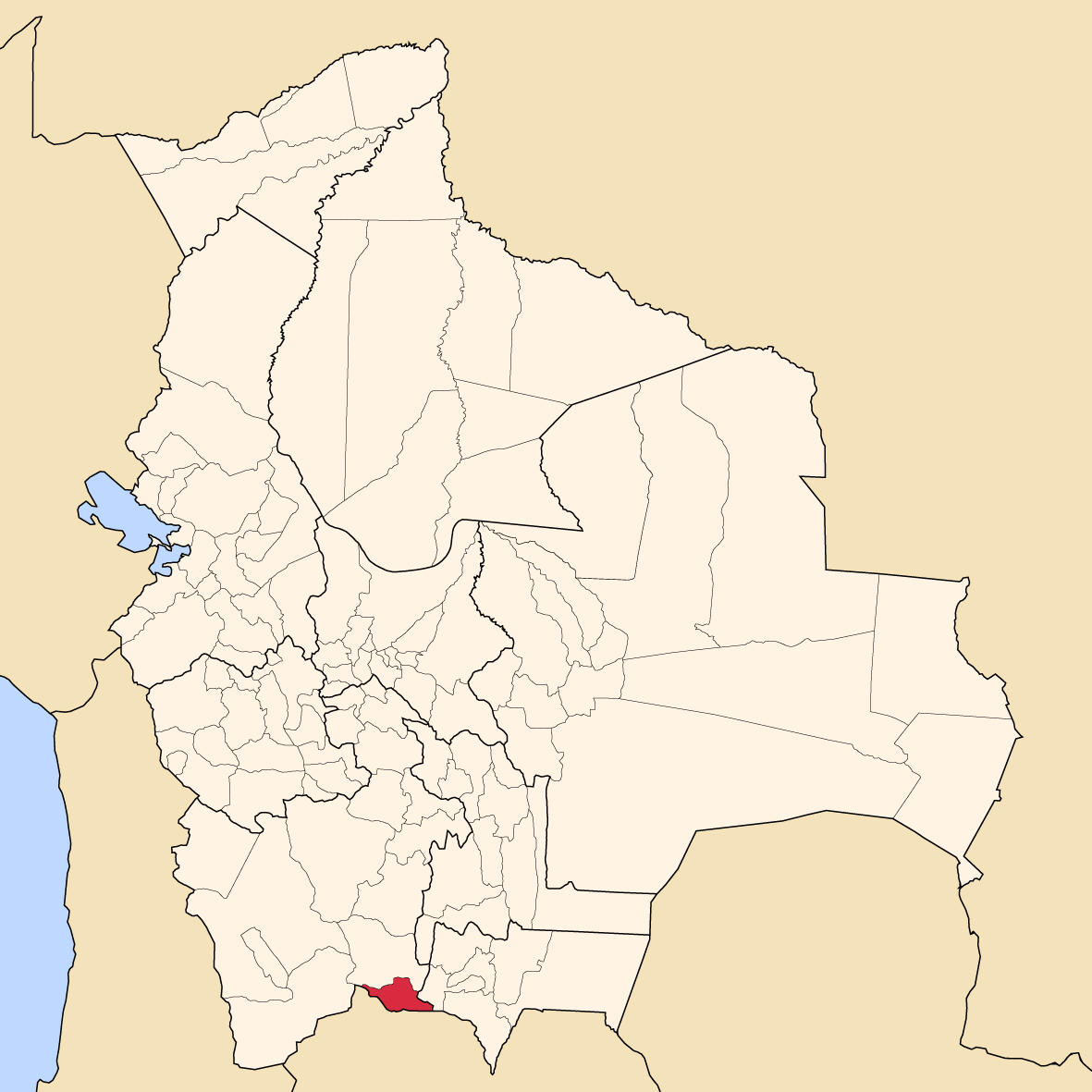
- Location of the Modesto Omiste Province or Villazón Municipality within Bolivia

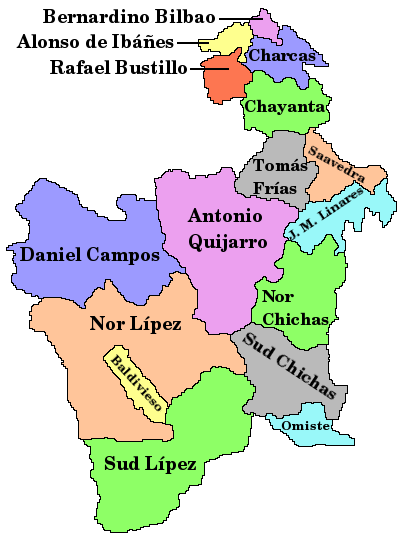
- Provinces of the Potosí Department
- Coordinates: 18°53′S 65°39′W
- Country: Bolivia
- Department: Potosí Department
- Municipalities: 1
- Cantons: 13
- Capital: Villazón

Area
  - Total: 986 sq mi (2,554 km^{2})

Population (2024)
  - Total: 49,312
  - Density: 50.01/sq mi (19.31/km^{2})
  - Ethnicities: Quechua
- Time zone: UTC-4 (BOT)
- Area code: BO.PO.MO

Modesto Omiste is a province in the south of the Bolivian Potosí Department. Its capital is Villazón. The province is named after the Bolivian writer and politician Modesto Omiste Tinajeros.

== Location ==
Modesto Omiste province is one of sixteen provinces in the Potosí Department. It is located between 21° 39' and 22° 06' South and between 65° 10' and 66° 08' West. In the north it borders Sud Chichas Province, in the east Tarija Department, in the south and south-west the Republic of Argentina. The province extends over 120 km from east to west and 65 km from north to south.

== Division ==
The province comprises only one municipality (municipio), Villazón Municipality which is identical to the province. It was named after the Bolivian president Eliodoro Villazón

The province is further subdivided into cantons (cantones):

- Berque
- Casira
- Chagua
- Chipihuayco
- Mojo
- Moraya
- Sagnasti
- Salitre
- San Pedro de Sococha
- Sarcari
- Sococha
- Villazón
- Yuruma

== Population ==
The main language of the province is Spanish, spoken by 97%, while 44% of the population speak Quechua. The population rose from 31,737 (1992 census) to 36,266 (2001 census), an increase of 14.3%.

44% of the population have no access to electricity, 54% have no sanitary facilities. 18% of the population are employed in agriculture, 11% in industry, 71% in general services. 84% of the population are Catholics, 11% Protestants.

Most of the people are not indigenous, 43,3% are citizens of Quechua descent.

Ethnic group	%
Quechua	43,3
Aymara	7,8
Guaraní, Chiquitos, Moxos	0,2
Not indigenous	48,3
Other indigenous groups	0,5
