= Mojo, Potosí =

Mojo
- Town
- Location within Bolivia
- Coordinates: 21°49′S 65°33′W
- Country: Bolivia
- Department: Potosí Department
- Province: Modesto Omiste Province
- Municipality: Villazón Municipality
- Elevation: 11,200 ft (3,400 m)

Population (2012)
  - Total: 253
- Time zone: UTC-4 (BOT)

Mojo is a town in the Potosí Department of Bolivia.

== Climate ==
Climate data for Mojo, elevation 3,400 m (11,200 ft)
Month	Jan	Feb	Mar	Apr	May	Jun	Jul	Aug	Sep	Oct	Nov	Dec	Year
Mean daily maximum °C (°F)	22.2 (72.0)	21.7 (71.1)	22.0 (71.6)	21.6 (70.9)	18.9 (66.0)	17.6 (63.7)	17.2 (63.0)	19.0 (66.2)	20.8 (69.4)	22.7 (72.9)	23.6 (74.5)	23.2 (73.8)	20.9 (69.6)
Daily mean °C (°F)	14.8 (58.6)	14.4 (57.9)	14.1 (57.4)	12.4 (54.3)	9.0 (48.2)	7.1 (44.8)	7.0 (44.6)	8.7 (47.7)	11.0 (51.8)	13.3 (55.9)	14.6 (58.3)	15.1 (59.2)	11.8 (53.2)
Mean daily minimum °C (°F)	7.3 (45.1)	7.0 (44.6)	6.2 (43.2)	3.2 (37.8)	−1.0 (30.2)	−3.5 (25.7)	−3.1 (26.4)	−1.6 (29.1)	1.1 (34.0)	3.9 (39.0)	5.7 (42.3)	6.9 (44.4)	2.7 (36.8)
Average precipitation mm (inches)	105.7 (4.16)	78.4 (3.09)	54.9 (2.16)	8.6 (0.34)	0.7 (0.03)	0.2 (0.01)	0.1 (0.00)	0.7 (0.03)	3.1 (0.12)	12.0 (0.47)	30.7 (1.21)	78.9 (3.11)	374 (14.73)
Average precipitation days	11.3	8.8	6.5	1.3	0.1	0.0	0.0	0.1	0.5	1.8	4.4	9.0	43.8
Average relative humidity (%)	62.7	62.8	61.2	50.9	45.4	47.6	43.5	41.9	42.7	48.3	49.1	55.5	51.0
Source: Servicio Nacional de Meteorología e Hidrología de Bolivia
