= Ayata Municipality =

- Municipality
- Location of the Ayata Municipality within Bolivia
- Coordinates: 15°15′0″S 68°45′0″W
- Country: Bolivia
- Department: La Paz Department
- Province: Muñecas Province
- Seat: Ayata

Government
  - Mayor: Julian Jala Flores (2007)
  - President: Donato Fuentes Calderon (2007)

Area
  - Total: 255 sq mi (661 km^{2})
- Elevation: 13,000 ft (4,000 m)

Population (2001)
  - Total: 8,143
- Time zone: UTC-4 (BOT)

Ayata Municipality is the second municipal section of the Muñecas Province in the La Paz Department, Bolivia. Its seat is Ayata.
