= Gregorio Fernández Cuello =

Peruvian military personnel (1790–1845)

Gregorio Fernández

Prefect of La Paz
- In office 1826–1826
- President: Antonio José de Sucre
- Preceded by: Andrés de Santa Cruz
- Succeeded by: Manuel Monje
- In office 1843–1843
- President: José Ballivián
- Preceded by: Dámaso Bilbao la Vieja
- Succeeded by: Hilarión Fernández

Personal details
- Born: José Gregorio Fernández Cuello; 24 December 1789 Salta, Intendancy of Salta, Viceroyalty of the Río de la Plata
- Died: 4 October 1845 (aged 55) Sucre, Republic of Bolivia
- Spouse: Pascuala Bailona Costas Frías
- Children: 4
- Parent(s): Manuel Salvador Fernández del Casso; Cecilia Catalina Cuello Fernández Cabezas y Argañaraz

Military service
- Allegiance: Bolivia, Argentina, Peru
- Branch/service: Bolivian Army, Argentine Army, Peruvian Army
- Years of service: 1809–1828
- Rank: Brigadier General
- Battles/wars: Battle of Junín, Battle of Huaqui, Battle of Cotagaita, Battle of Salta, Battle of Tucumán

José Gregorio Fernández Cuello (24 December 1789 – 4 October 1845) was an Argentine military officer who took part in the Spanish American Wars of Independence in what are now Argentina, Bolivia, and Peru. He served in the armies of his native country as well as in those of Peru and Bolivia, attaining the rank of general. He was also Prefect of La Paz and Chuquisaca.

== Biography ==
Gregorio Fernández was born in the city of Salta, Intendancy of Salta, Viceroyalty of the Río de la Plata, on 24 December 1789, the son of Manuel Salvador Fernández del Casso and Cecilia Cuello Fernández Cabezas y Argañaraz. He was baptized on 26 December 1789, in the Church of San Juan Bautista de la Merced in Salta, with Dr. Tadeo Fernández Dávila as his godfather.

He supported the May Revolution and joined the Army of the North (United Provinces of the Río de la Plata). He fought in the Battles of Cotagaita and Suipacha. In 1811, holding the rank of lieutenant of the 1st Company of Regiment No. 2, he fought in the Battle of Huaqui.

He took part in the Jujuy Exodus and fought under the command of Manuel Belgrano in the victories of Tucumán and Salta, being promoted to brevet captain. He fought at Vilcapugio, and after the defeat at the Battle of Ayohuma he was taken prisoner on 14 November 1813. He remained in the Casas Matas of El Callao for eight years. In 1821 he was released as a result of a prisoner exchange negotiated by General José de San Martín.

Incorporated into the Liberating Army, in 1823 he was in command of Battalion No. 2 of Regiment No. 1, Cazadores del Perú. After the withdrawal of Liberator José de San Martín, he came under the orders of Simón Bolívar. He served “from this time on with the most distinguished credit in the Peruvian army.” Promoted to the rank of colonel of infantry, he fought in the Battle of Junín on 6 August 1824. In 1825 he received command of the new Pichincha Regiment, formed from the 1st and 2nd battalions, and the following year he was promoted to general in the armies of Peru.

In April 1826 he was appointed by General Antonio José de Sucre as Prefect and Commanding General of the Department of La Paz. In October 1827 he became involved in what he described as “a conspiracy whose purpose was to overthrow the government of the republic,” after receiving, from then-major of Battalion No. 2 José Ballivián, a letter delivered by General Francisco Anglada and allegedly sent by Marshal Andrés de Santa Cruz. Fernández had Anglada arrested, which caused other officers involved to flee. Despite this, Santa Cruz implicated him in the conspiracy, leading Fernández to question him as to “what malicious intent, or what error or disgraceful or unworthy precipitate action of a magistrate, is being attributed to me by these proceedings,” and to demand that he “not lightly offend the reputation of a magistrate who, in fulfillment of his most sacred duties, has acted according to principles dictated by morality, politics, and the laws of the state.”

On 24 December 1827, he was arrested by the mutineers of the Voltígeros battalion. After the signing in 1828—following the mutiny of April 18 and the first invasion of Bolivia by the Peruvian general Agustín Gamarra—of the Treaty of Piquiza, whose Article 4 provided that all foreign generals, chiefs, and officers serving in the National Army should leave the country, some Colombian officers, among them General Gregorio Fernández, angered by the treaty, plotted to overthrow General José María Pérez de Urdininea. The latter, invested with supreme command of the Republic due to Marshal Sucre's illness after the April assassination attempt, had ratified that shameful agreement. Informed of these maneuvers, Urdininea “took measures to prevent such an outrage,” ordering chiefs Anselmo Rivas and José Ballivián to place the forces under their command on alert.

Seeing their plans thwarted, the conspirators sought salvation in flight. Accordingly, Fernández withdrew to Salta, where he lived for many years until, called by General Ballivián in 1843, he returned to Bolivia. There he once again held important posts, having been Prefect of Chuquisaca that same year.

He died on 4 October 1845, in Sucre, possibly as a result of sepsis following a surgical procedure performed by physician José Matías Agois, which was questioned in terms of necessity and skill by Dr. Manuel Ascencio Cuellar.

== Family ==
He married Bailona Costas Frías on 28 November 1825, in the Cathedral of Potosí, Bolivia. His wife was the daughter of Francisco Andrés Avelino Costas Gauna and Justa de Frías y Vélez Alcócer. They were the parents of:

- Dr. Emilio Fernández Costas, born in 1830. He married Bailona Molina Frías, daughter of Dr. Manuel Molina Zamudio, on 15 July 1854, in the Church of San Miguel Arcángel, Sucre.
- Ana María del Carmen Fernández Costas, born 26 July 1831, in Potosí.
- Francisco Fernández Costas, born 9 March 1833, in Potosí. He married Carolina Gandarias Reynolds on 2 May 1867, in the Church of Santo Domingo, Sucre.
- María del Carmen Fernández Costas, born 6 October 1845, in Sucre. She married José Casimiro Santiváñez Escalier on 18 June 1881, in the Church of Santo Domingo, Sucre.

His wife Bailona died in Sucre on 30 October 1886 and was buried in the Church of Santo Domingo, Sucre.
