= Modesto Omiste Tinajeros =

Bolivian writer and diplomat (born 1840)

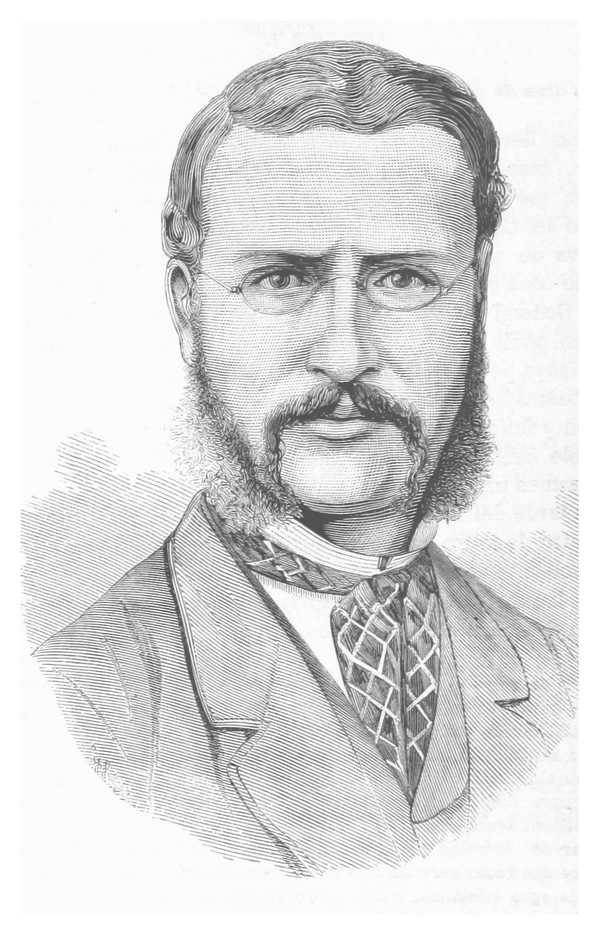
- Born: June 6, 1840; Potosí, Bolivia
- Died: 1898 (aged 57–58)
- Occupations: Writer, journalist, educator, lawyer, politician, diplomat, historian
- Known for: Advocating for free public primary education in Bolivia, founding the Liberal Party, founding the newspaper El Tiempo
- Notable work: "History of Bolivia", "Caracas, birthplace of the Liberator"

Modesto Omiste Tinajeros (June 6, 1840 – 1898) was a Bolivian writer, journalist, educator, lawyer, politician, diplomat, and historian.

== History ==
Omiste was born in the city of Potosí on June 6, 1840. He graduated from the Pichincha National College, specializing in literature, when he was 15 years old. By the time he was 20 years old, he had graduated from the University of San Francisco Xavier de Chuquisaca with a degree in law.

Shortly after, he returned to his hometown of Potosí and began teaching natural sciences at the Pichincha National College. From an early age he was concerned about the education system in Bolivia, advocating the right to free public primary education. As councilman, he created the first public schools in the country, one for boys and one for girls. He was also involved in politics, was ambassador to the United States and founded the Liberal Party. As a journalist and writer, he founded the newspaper El Tiempo on January 1, 1885, using a printing press he had brought from Philadelphia, Pennsylvania. He wrote various books such as "History of Bolivia" and "Caracas, birthplace of the Liberator" among others. Omiste also translated various texts from French and English into Spanish, printed them at his own cost, and distributed them for free to municipal schools in Potosí.

The province Modesto Omiste in the Potosí department is named after him. The first teacher's school in Sucre is also named after him.

== Teachers' Day ==
As acknowledgment of Omiste's dedication for the advancement of education and culture in Bolivia, his birthday of June 6 was announced in 1924 by Bolivian President Bautista Saavedra as the day to nationally celebrate Teacher's Day.

== External sources ==
- "Homenaje al educador Boliviano"
- Homenaje al educador Boliviano laprensa.com.bo
