= Ayata =

- Town
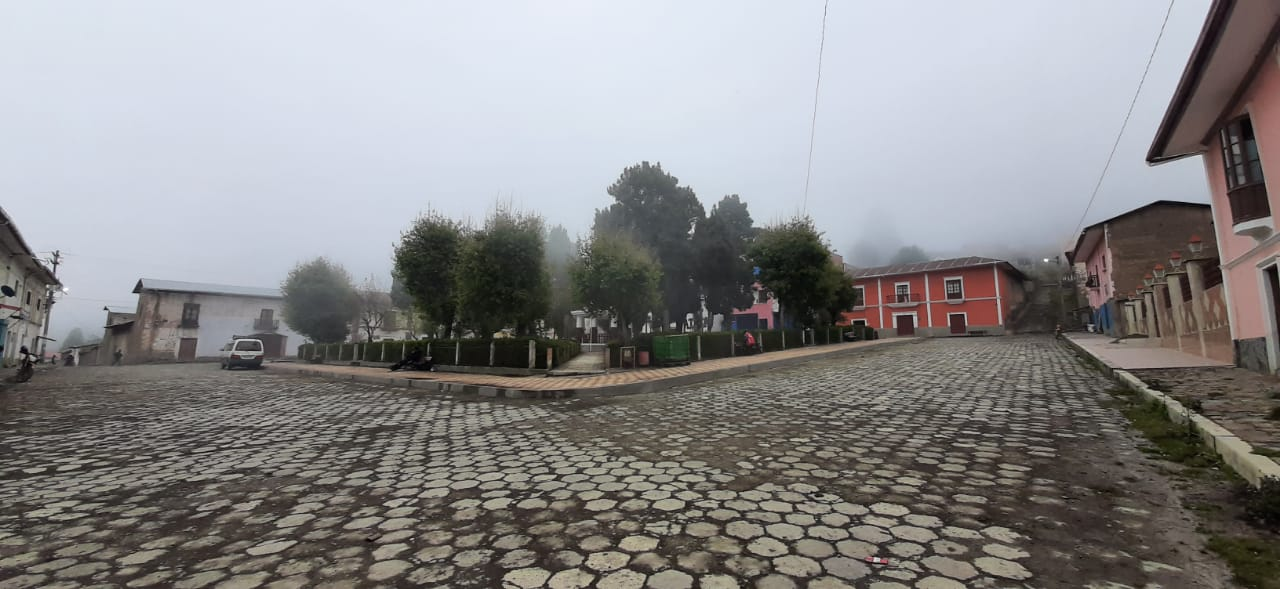
- Picture of Ayata

- Location within Bolivia
- Coordinates: 15°27′S 68°45′W
- Country: Bolivia
- Department: La Paz Department
- Province: Muñecas Province
- Municipality: Ayata Municipality

Population (2001)
  - Total: 147
- Time zone: UTC-4 (BOT)

Ayata is a location in the La Paz Department in western Bolivia. It is the seat of the Ayata Municipality, the second municipal section of the Muñecas Province.
