= Manuel Molina Zamudio =

19th-century Bolivian politician and lawyer

Minister of Finance
- In office 28 April 1843 – 19 March 1844
- President: José Ballivián
- Preceded by: Hilarión Fernández
- Succeeded by: Tomás Frías

Prefect of Potosí
- In office 19 October 1831 – 4 January 1834
- President: Andrés de Santa Cruz
- Preceded by: Mariano Armaza
- Succeeded by: Hilarión Fernández

Personal details
- Born: Manuel de Molina Zamudio; December 20, 1788 Potosí, Upper Peru, Viceroyalty of Peru
- Died: March 19, 1868 Sucre, Bolivia
- Spouse: María del Carmen Frías Ametller
- Children: 7
- Parent(s): Francisco Plácido de Molina; María Mercedes Zamudio
- Education: University of San Francisco Xavier
- Occupation: Lawyer, politician
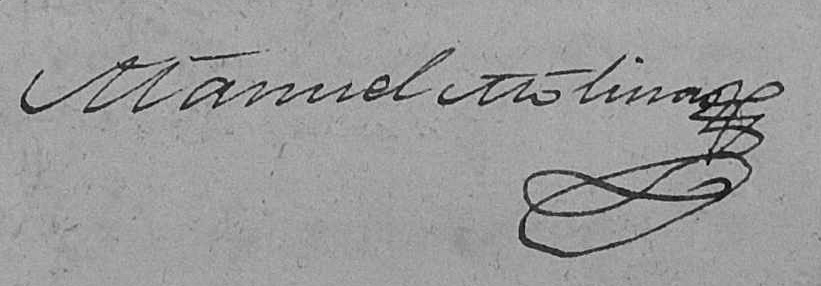
- Signature

Manuel Molina Zamudio (20 December 1788 – 19 March 1868) was a Bolivian revolutionary, politician, and lawyer who served as Prefect of Potosí and Chuquisca. He was Minister Plenipotenciary of Bolivia in Chile (1839-1840), and later Minister of Finance in the government of José Ballivián.

His granddaughter, Carmen Calvo Molina, was the wife of the prominent politician and educator Daniel Sánchez Bustamante. Through Carmen, he is the great-grandfather of two famed Bolivian feminists: María Luisa Sánchez Bustamante and Carmen Sánchez Bustamante. The latter one being the mother of Gonzalo Sánchez de Lozada. Another descendant of his if Bolivian billionaire Marcelo Claure Bedoya.

== Early life ==
Born in Potosí, Upper Peru, Viceroyalty of Peru, on 20 December 1788, Molina was the son of Francisco Plácido de Molina y Noguera, Public Scribe, Notary, and Secretary of Potosí, and María Mercedes de Zamudio. By 1809, he had a Doctorate in Law from the University of San Francisco Xavier of Chuquisaca.

== The Revolutionary War ==
Molina began his political career during the 1810 Potosí Revolution, where he incarcerated Governor Francisco de Paula Sanz. News of the royalist defeat at the Battle of Suipacha spread quickly in Potosí, and the people demanded an open town council (cabildo abierto). While the council was in session, a group of revolutionaries seized the jail and headed toward the council building.The revolutionary Molina stormed into the building and arrested Governor Sanz, taking him to the public jail. The church bells were rung to summon an open town council (cabildo abierto), which declared its recognition of and allegiance to the Junta of Buenos Aires. The barracks, artillery, and weapons were seized, and the Royal Treasury funds were secured.

The open council then proceeded to form a provisional junta composed of: Joaquín de la Quintana (interim governor and president of the council), Salvador Matos, Pedro Ascárate, Eustaquio Eguibar (or Eguivar), Alejo Nogales, Mariano Nogales, Manuel Millares, Manuel Molina, Mariano Subieta, Melchor Daza, Diego Barrenechea, Pedro Crotas, Mariano Toro, and Manuel Orosco y Bulucua.

Sanz remained imprisoned in the Royal Mint along with Vicente Nieto de las Viñas and José de Córdoba y Rojas for a month. On November 10, 1810, a cabildo abierto appointed Salvador Matos as Potosí’s representative to the Junta. Challenged by Juan José Castelli for being a priest, he was unable to travel to Buenos Aires.

On November 25, 1810, the vanguard division of the auxiliary army, commanded by Martín Miguel de Güemes, entered Potosí, followed soon after by the rest of the army under Castelli, who were triumphantly received.

On November 13, an open town council convened in Chuquisaca, which swore allegiance to the Junta and declared its previous adherence to the Viceroyalty of Peru null and void.

=== Executions in Potosí ===
The repression carried out by José Manuel de Goyeneche against the revolutionaries in La Paz caused a deep impression in Buenos Aires, where fragmented reports arrived and some of the leaders sent from Buenos Aires were wrongly blamed for the crackdown—turning them into targets of resentment among the revolutionaries.

During his administration in Upper Peru, Castelli took drastic measures that earned him the hostility of much of the upper classes, such as ordering the execution on December 15 in Potosí of Marshal Nieto, Sanz, and Córdoba y Rojas. They had refused to swear allegiance to the Junta, and Castelli acted on Moreno’s orders in reprisal for the executions of the leaders of the La Paz revolution. The Bishop of La Paz and Goyeneche were also sentenced to death should they be captured.

The three were tried at the army headquarters in Potosí, with Eustoquio Díaz Vélez presiding as the appointed judge, and were sentenced to death by Castelli in the name of the Junta on December 14 for crimes against the king and the homeland. On December 15, 1810, at 10 a.m., they were executed by firing squad in the Main Square. Despite the condemned men’s past actions, the execution was not well received in Potosí, as many placed the true responsibility on Goyeneche. On January 9, 1811, Castelli issued a decree declaring the three executed men stripped of their positions, ranks, honors, and property.

== The Bolivian Republic ==
Upon the conclusion of the Bolivian War of Independence, Molina, as an early revolutionary, secured a position as a Minister in the Government of Antonio José de Sucre. He became a staunch supporter of the Marshal of Ayacucho, opposing his downfall in 1828. When the Marshal of Zepita, Andrés de Santa Cruz, became President, Molina served as his secretary. He was also secretary to Mariano Enrique Calvo.

In 1833, Molina was appointed Prefect of Potosí. That same year, he married Carmen Frías Ametller on 13 March 1833 in the Church of San Miguel, Sucre. He was not able to attend the ceremony due to his duties, being represented by José Santos Cabero instead. His new wife was the younger sister of Tomás Frías, who later became President of Bolivia.

The following year, 1834, Molina was made Prefect of Chuquisaca. He held again the position in 1836. Between 1830 an 1839, essentially the entire presidency of Santa Cruz, Molina was among the most influential politicians in Bolivia. He, as a legalist lawmaker, held strong sway over the Supreme Court. As the government of Santa Cruz collapsed due to the intrugues of José Miguel de Velasco, Molina was sent to Chile. In 1840, he was in Santiago negotiating the peaceful resolution of the War of the Confederation.

Antagonized by the new government of General Velasco, Molina remained in Chile for a year. After which General José Ballivián seized power. Molina then returned to Bolivia, resuming his prominent position within the Bolivian government. On 28 April 1843 he was appointed Minister of Finance by Ballivián, a position he held until 19 March 1844. He was succeeded by his brother-in-law, Tomás Frías.

== Marriage and family ==
Molina was married to Carmen Frías Ametller in 1833. The union was strategic as the Molina and Frías families were among the most influential in Potosí. Carmen was the daughter of the wealthy criollos José María de Frías and Alejandra de Ametller. The Molina-Frías marriage produced the following issue:

- Bailona Molina Frías, born 27 April 1834 in Sucre. She married Dr. Emilio Fernández Costas, an influential lawyer and son of General Gregorio Fernández.
- Urbano Patricio Molina Frías, born 25 May 1836 in Sucre; died in infancy.
- Eugenia Molina Frías, born 20 January 1838 in Sucre; died 19 October 1881 in Sucre. She was unmarried and childless at the time of her death.
- Dr. Manuel Molina Frías, born around 1840 in Chile. He was a prominent lawyer and President of the Supreme Court of Bolivia, a position he held until his death on 30 October 1919. Married María Asunta Rivas Álvarez with issue.
- María Luz Molina Frías, born on 1 September 1842 in Sucre; died in infancy.
- José Osvaldo Molina Frías, born 8 December 1843 in Sucre; never married but left issue.
- Isabel Molina Frías, born 24 May 1852 in Sucre; married Dr. Nemesio Calvo Gómez with issue. Among her children is Carmen Calvo Molina, the wife of Daniel Sánchez Bustamante Vásquez-Bru and mother of María Luisa and Carmen Sánchez Bustamante Calvo.

Carmen Frías died on 27 July 1876 at the Molina family hacienda, Bellavista. She was buried the following day in the Church of Santo Domingo, Sucre.

== Retirement from politics and death ==
Molina seemingly retired from politics after the fall of Ballivián. Molina was likely persecuted by the government of Manuel Isidoro Belzu due to his affiliation with the ballivianistas. Molina retired to private life around 1850, almost entirely disappearing from the political arena after 1855. He died on 19 March 1868 at his hacienda, Bellavista, in Yotala, at the age of 79. He was buried in the Church of Santo Domingo, Sucre. In 1937, the municipality of Potosí attempted to have his remains transferred from Sucre.
