= Cobija, Chile =

First significant Pacific port in eastern Bolivia

Coordinates: 22°33′0″S 70°16′0″W

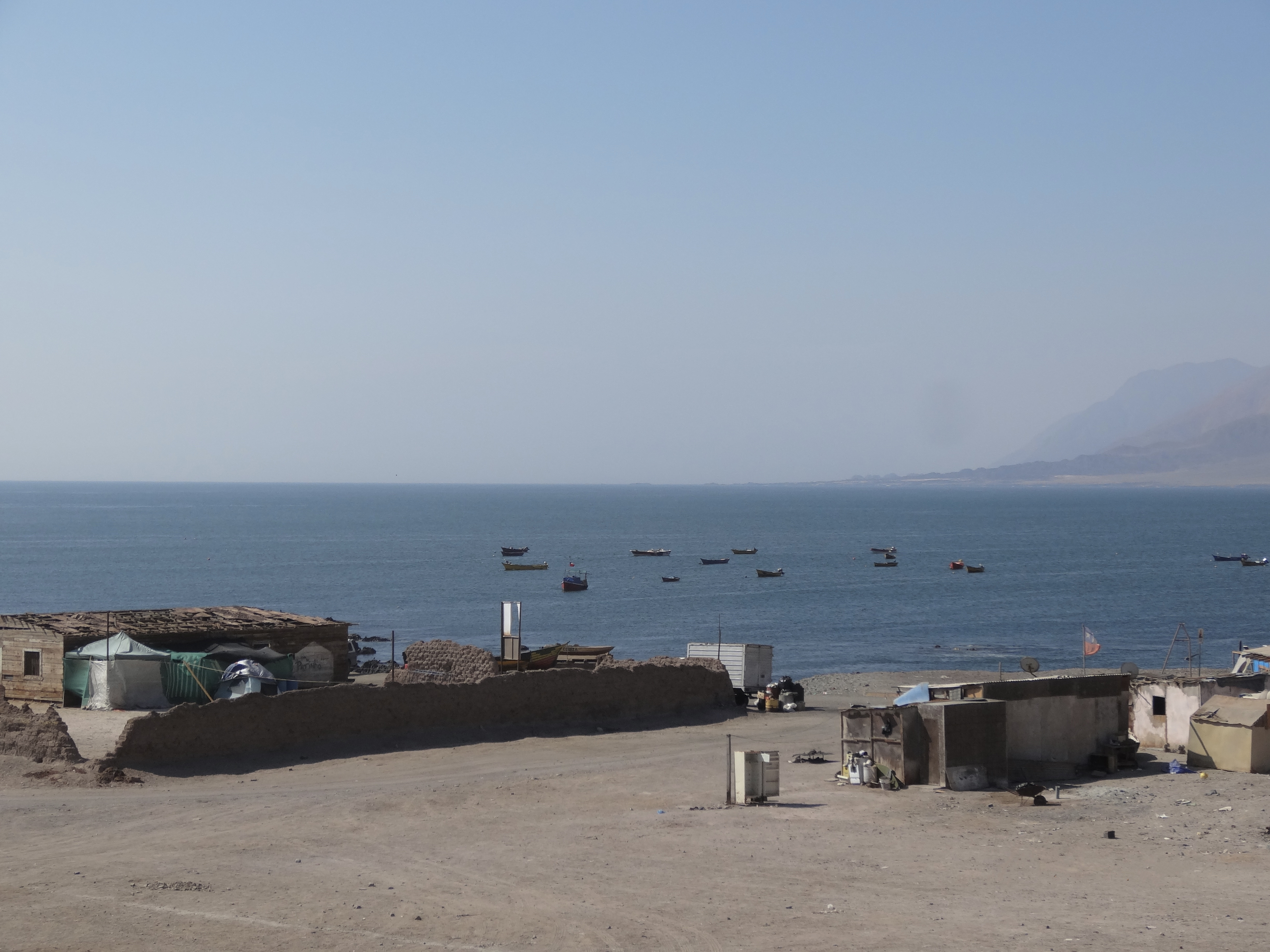
Ruins in Cobija, Chile

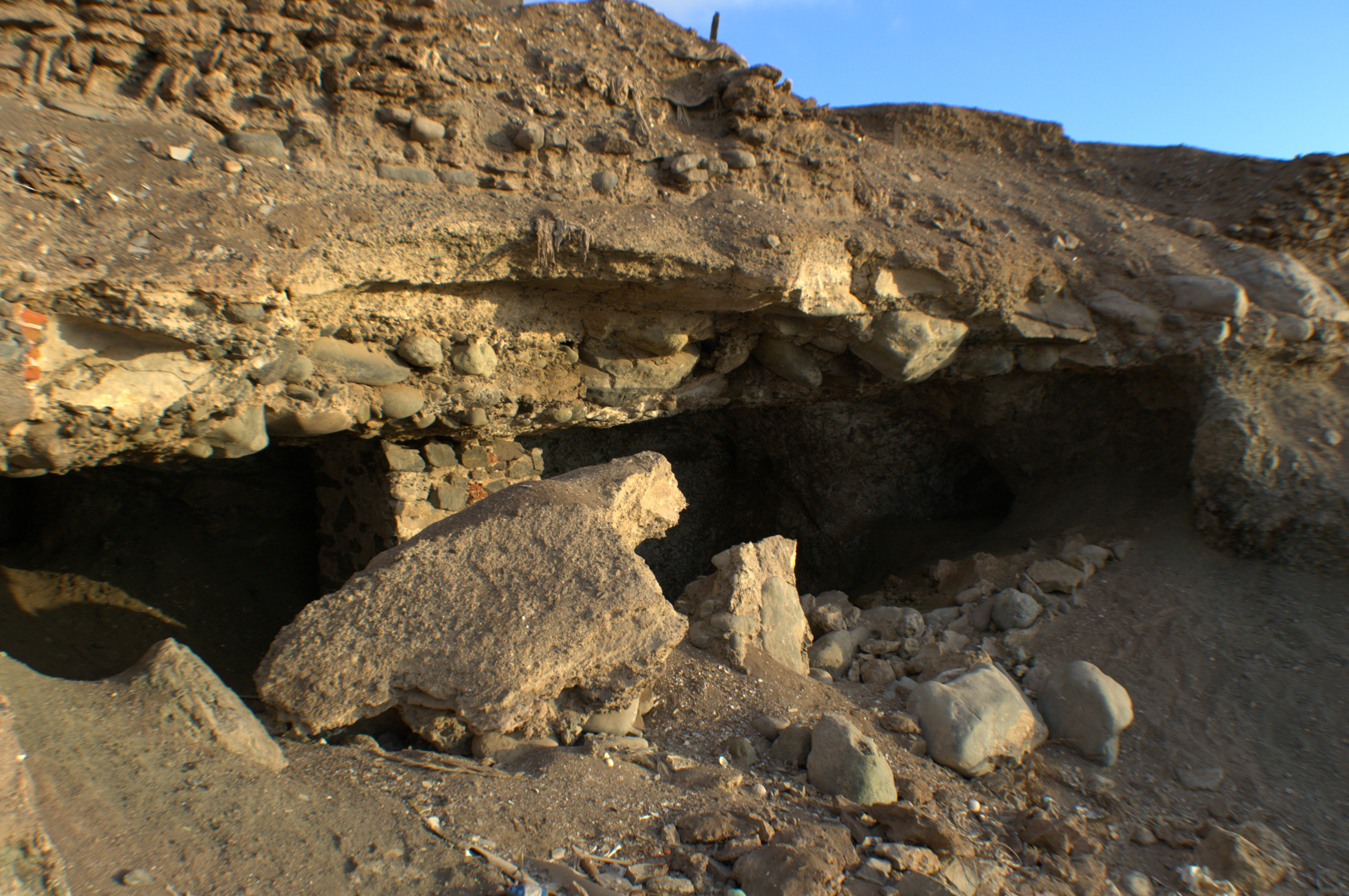
Ruins in Cobija, Chile

Cobija (previously known as Puerto La Mar) was the first significant Pacific Ocean port of independent Bolivia. In 2002, it had 41 inhabitants and its economy was totally based on fishing.

The Atacama border dispute between Bolivia and Chile (1825-1879)

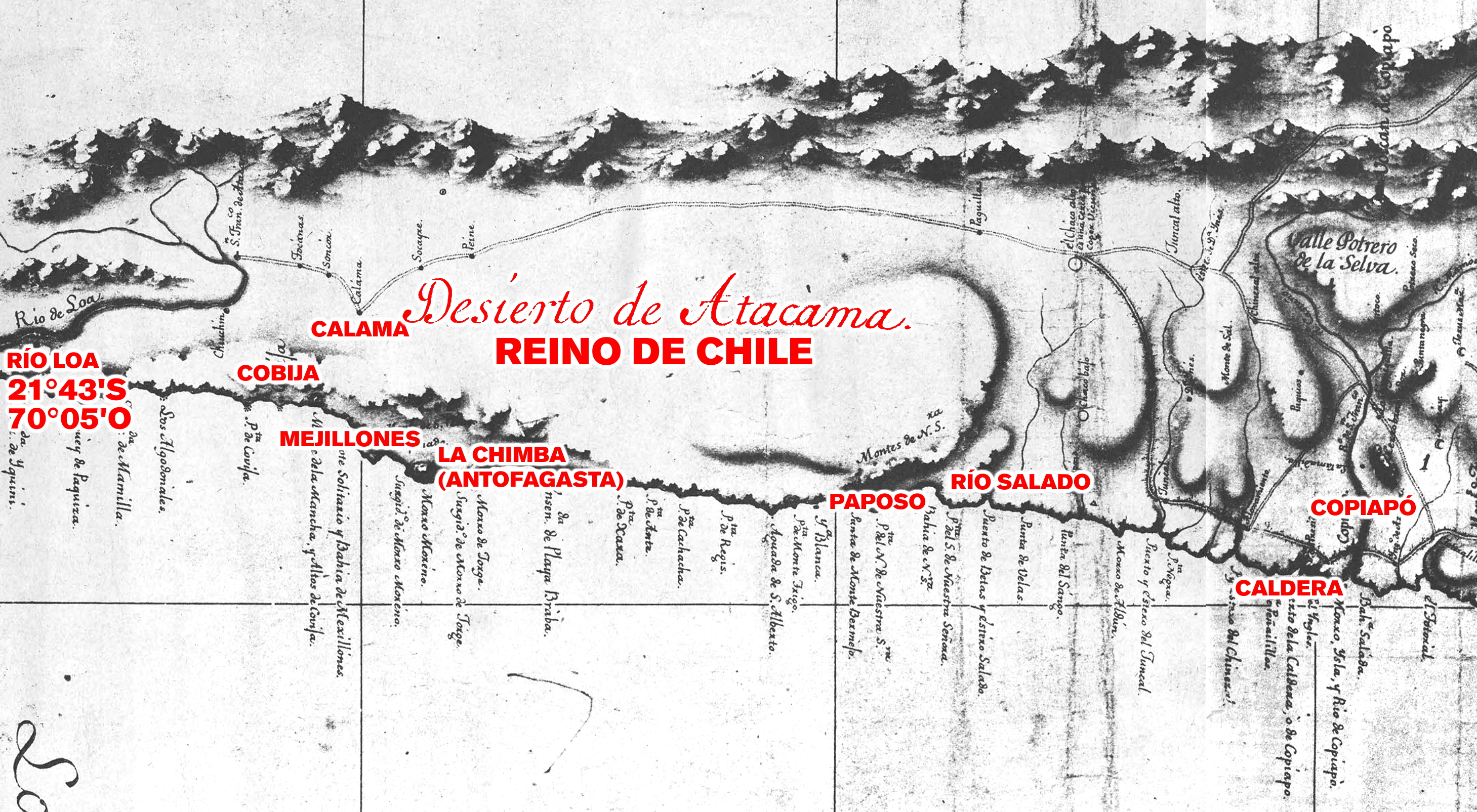
Andrés Baleato's 1793 map showing the internal border of Chile and Peru in the Loa River during the Spanish Empire

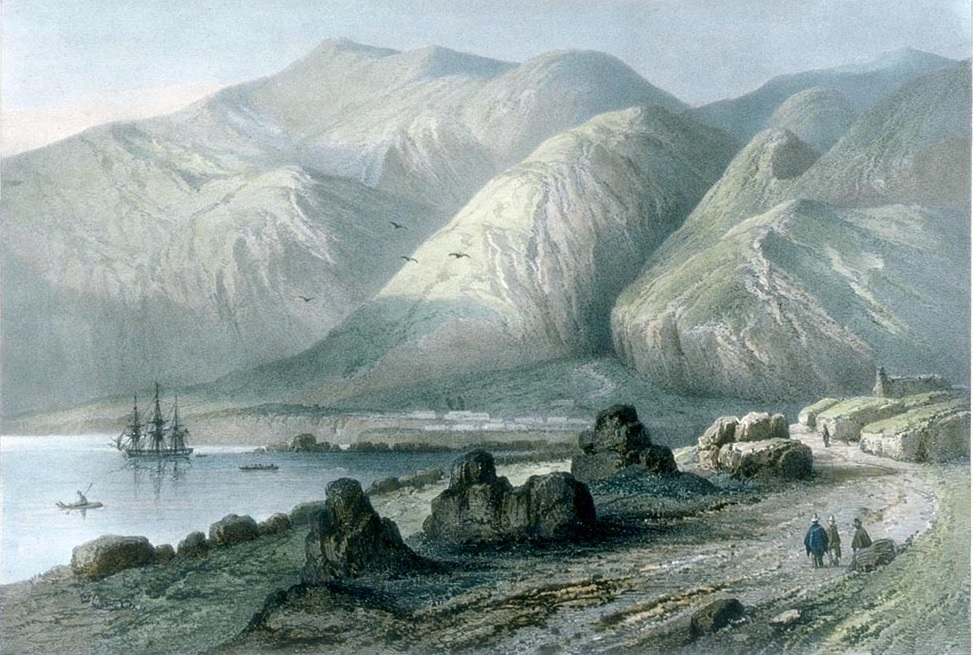
Port of Cobija (1841)

Cobija was included in maps of the Captaincy General of Chile in the 18th century, depending from the city of Copiapó.

In 1825, it was the main port of Bolivia due to the Potosí silver mine. The port was during the Bolivian period markedly multiethnic and with much of its economy centered on the smuggling of silver, a task in which indigenous Atacameños and Changos likely participated.

The territory was disputed between Chile and Bolivia until the signing of the Boundary Treaty of 1866. The city was destroyed by an earthquake on 13 August 1868, and a tsunami on 9 May 1877, but it was revived with the discovery of ore in Caracoles. At the end of the War of the Pacific in 1884, the city and the entire coastal province of Bolivia was annexed by Chile. In a treaty signed in 1904 Bolivia recognised the loss of Cobija.

Eventually, Cobija was replaced by the port at Antofagasta and in 1907 it was abandoned and its parish was moved to the town of Gatico which is itself now nearly a ruin.

== See also ==
- Caracoles, Antofagasta
- Huanillos
- Tocopilla
- Mejillones
