= Aucapata =

Aucapata Awqapata
- Town
- Location within Bolivia
- Coordinates: 15°28′S 68°41′W
- Country: Bolivia
- Department: La Paz Department
- Province: Muñecas Province
- Municipality: Aucapata Municipality

Population (2001)
  - Total: 183
- Time zone: UTC-4 (BOT)

Aucapata is a location in the La Paz Department in Bolivia. It is the seat of the Aucapata Municipality, the third municipal section of the Muñecas Province.
