= Muñecas Province =

Muñecas
- Province
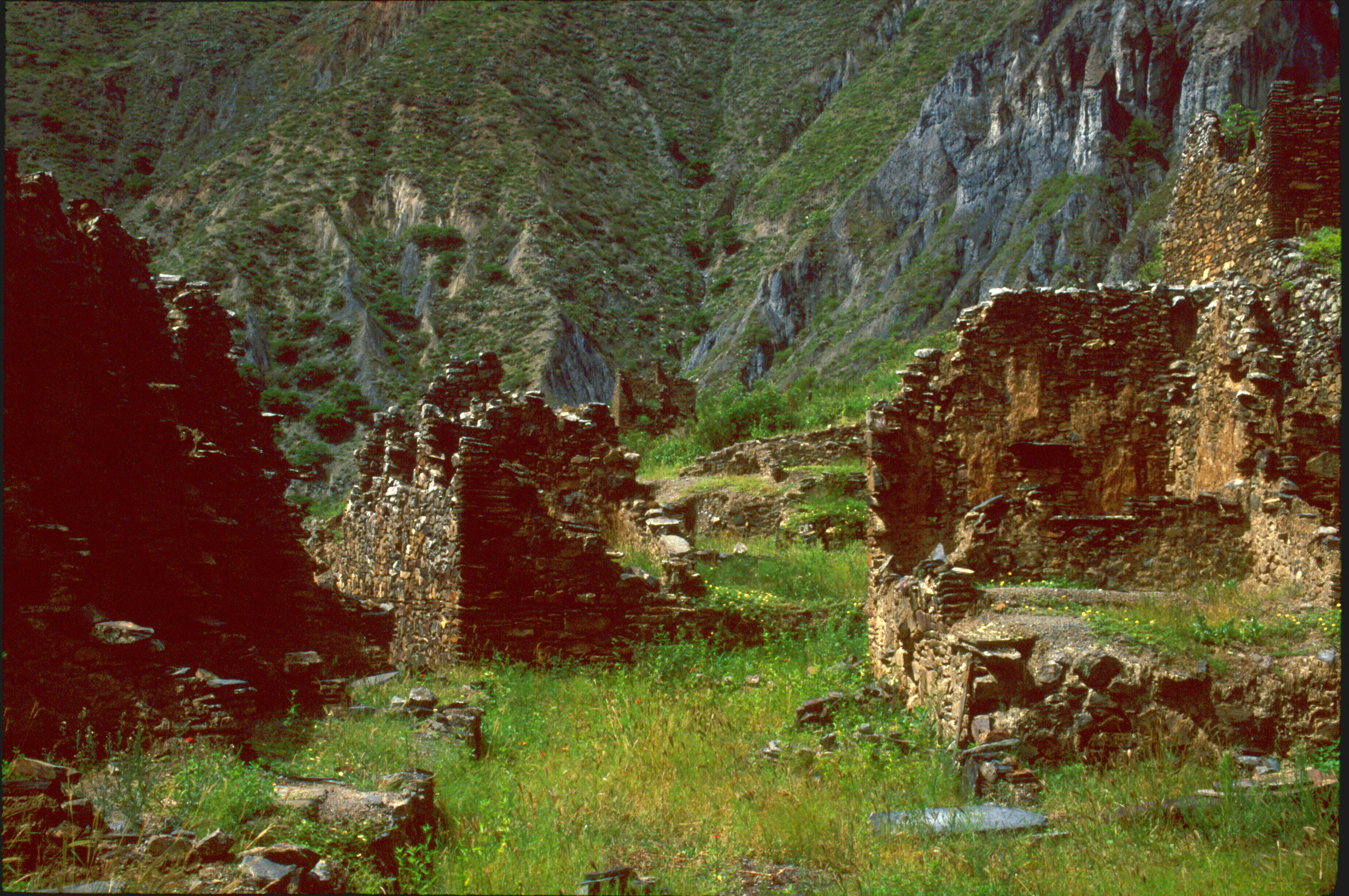
- The archaeological site of Iskanwaya in the Muñecas Province

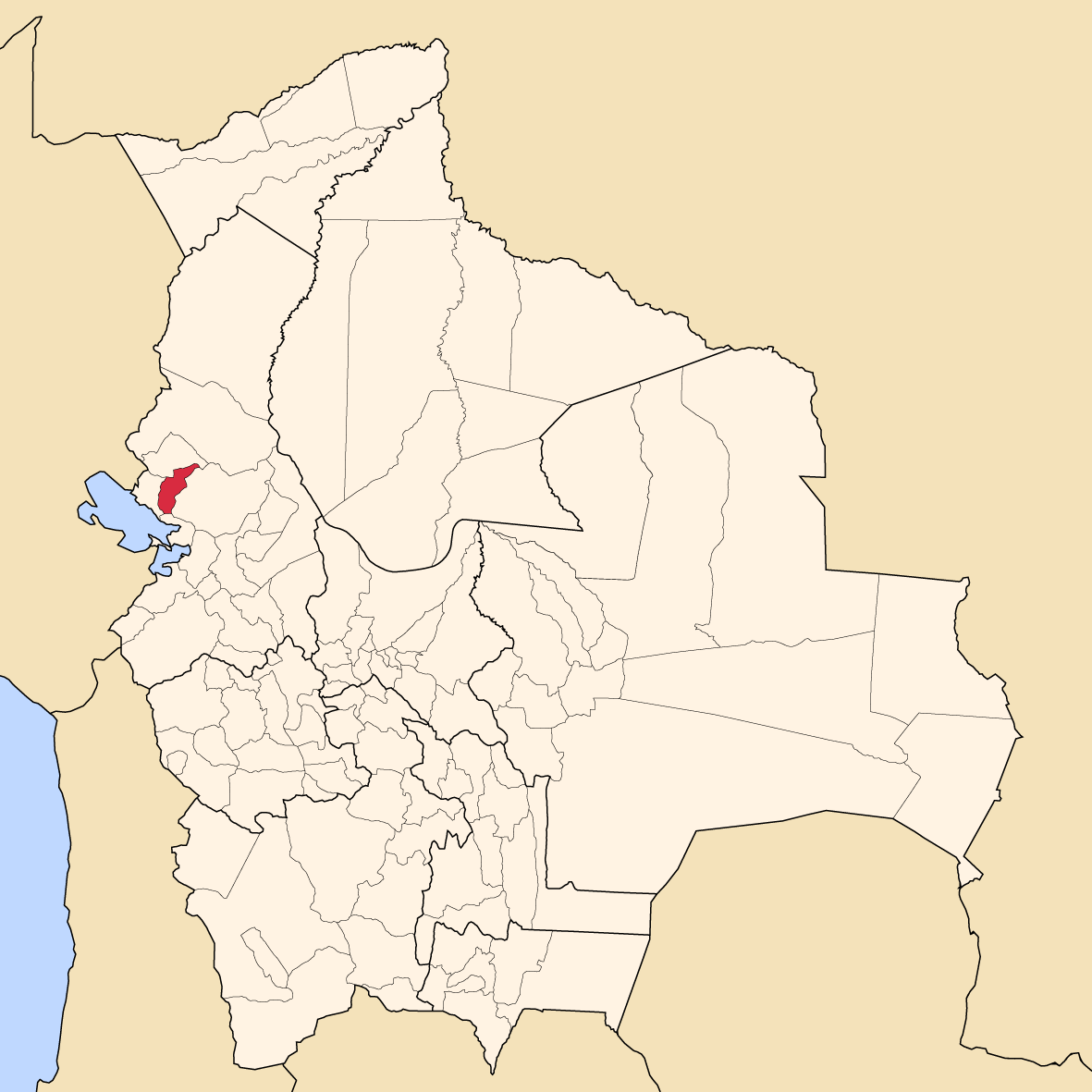
- Location of Muñecas Province within Bolivia

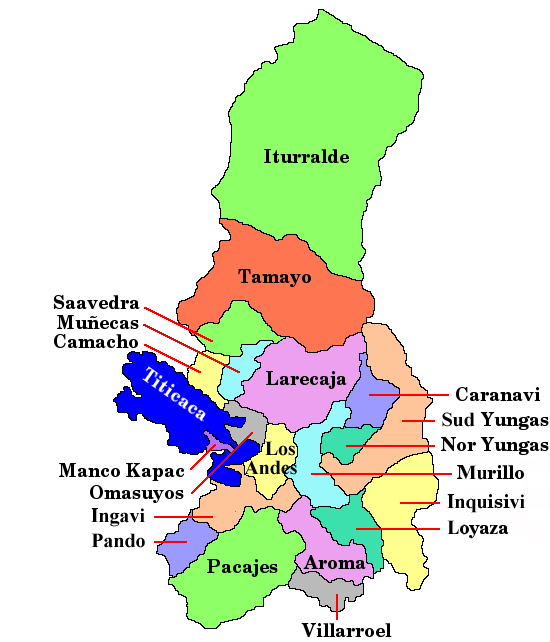
- Provinces of the La Paz Department
- Coordinates: 15°30′0″S 68°50′0″W
- Country: Bolivia
- Department: La Paz Department
- Municipalities: 3
- Capital: Puerto Acosta

Area
  - Total: 4,965 km^{2} (1,917 sq mi)

Population (2024 census)
  - Total: 33,348
  - Density: 6.717/km^{2} (17.40/sq mi)
- Time zone: UTC-4 (BOT)

Muñecas is a province in the Bolivian department of La Paz. Its capital is Chuma.

== Subdivision ==
The province is divided into three municipalities which are further subdivided into cantons.

Section	Municipality	Seat
1st	Chuma Municipality	Chuma
2nd	Ayata Municipality	Ayata
3rd	Aucapata Municipality	Aucapata

== Places of interest ==
- Iskanwaya
