= 1970 =

1970 in various calendars
- Gregorian calendar: 1970; MCMLXX
- Ab urbe condita: 2723
- Armenian calendar: 1419; ԹՎ ՌՆԺԹ
- Assyrian calendar: 6720
- Baháʼí calendar: 126–127
- Balinese saka calendar: 1891–1892
- Bengali calendar: 1376–1377
- Berber calendar: 2920
- British Regnal year: 18 Eliz. 2 – 19 Eliz. 2
- Buddhist calendar: 2514
- Burmese calendar: 1332
- Byzantine calendar: 7478–7479
- Chinese calendar: 己酉年 (Earth Rooster); 4667 or 4460 — to — 庚戌年 (Metal Dog); 4668 or 4461
- Coptic calendar: 1686–1687
- Discordian calendar: 3136
- Ethiopian calendar: 1962–1963
- Hebrew calendar: 5730–5731
- Hindu calendars
- Vikram Samvat: 2026–2027
- Shaka Samvat: 1891–1892
- Kali Yuga: 5070–5071
- Holocene calendar: 11970
- Igbo calendar: 970–971
- Iranian calendar: 1348–1349
- Islamic calendar: 1389–1390
- Japanese calendar: Shōwa 45 (昭和４５年)
- Javanese calendar: 1901–1902
- Juche calendar: 59
- Julian calendar: Gregorian minus 13 days
- Korean calendar: 4303
- Minguo calendar: ROC 59 民國59年
- Nanakshahi calendar: 502
- Thai solar calendar: 2513
- Tibetan calendar: ས་མོ་བྱ་ལོ་ (female Earth-Bird); 2096 or 1715 or 943 — to — ལྕགས་ཕོ་ཁྱི་ལོ་ (male Iron-Dog); 2097 or 1716 or 944
- Unix time: 0 – 31535999

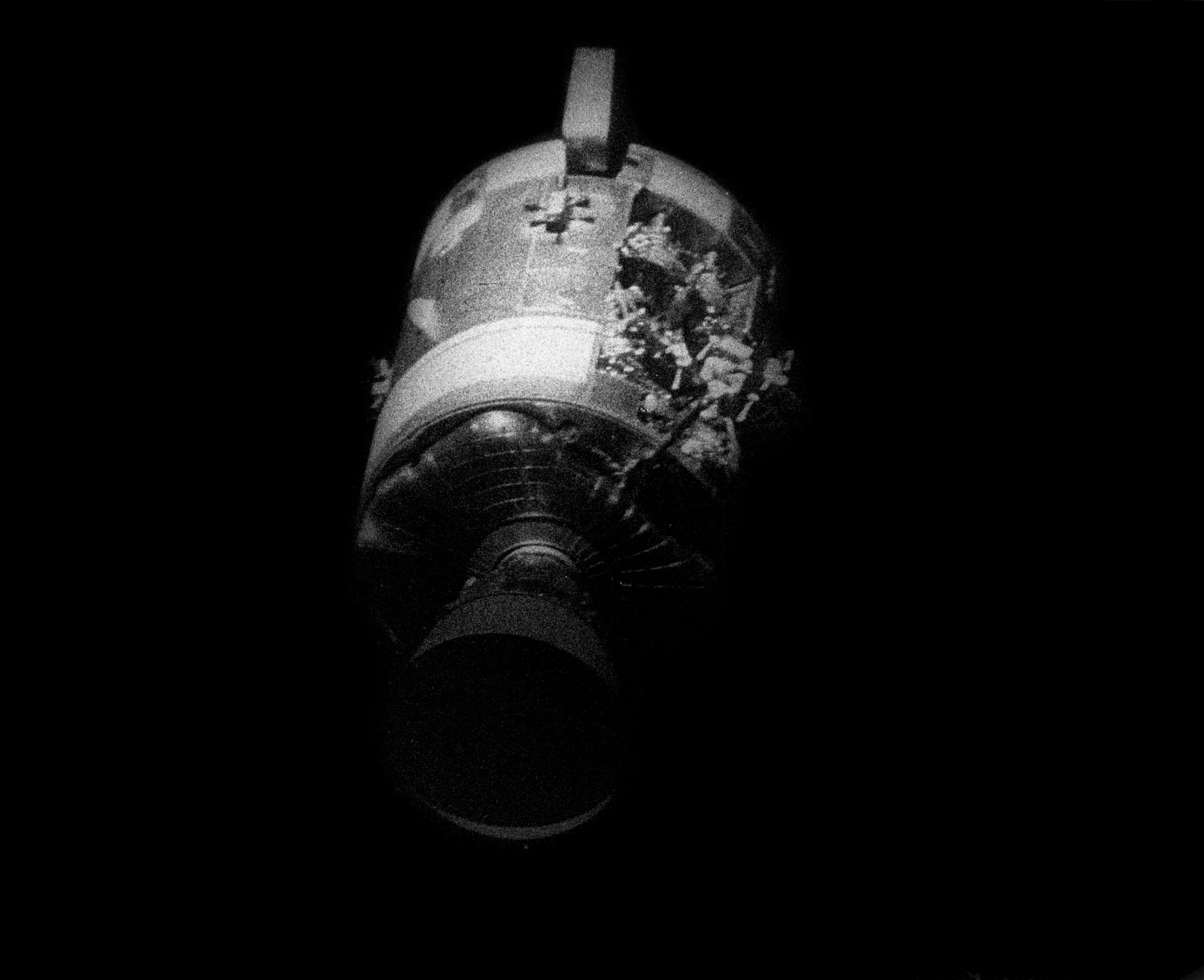
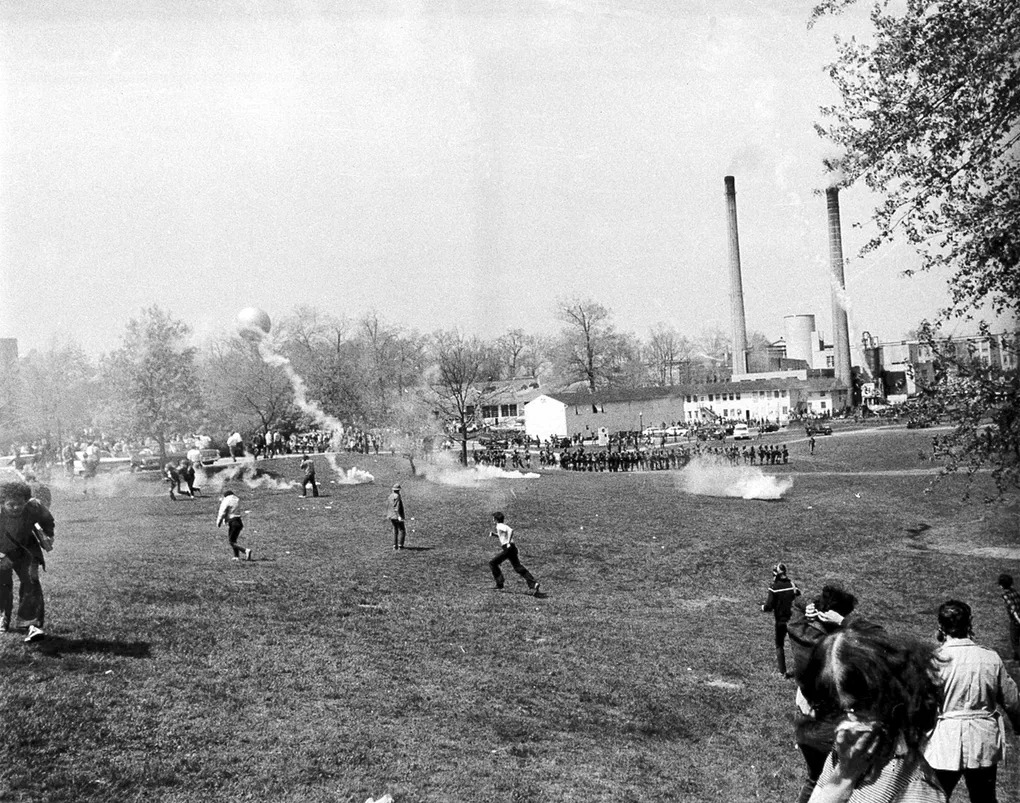
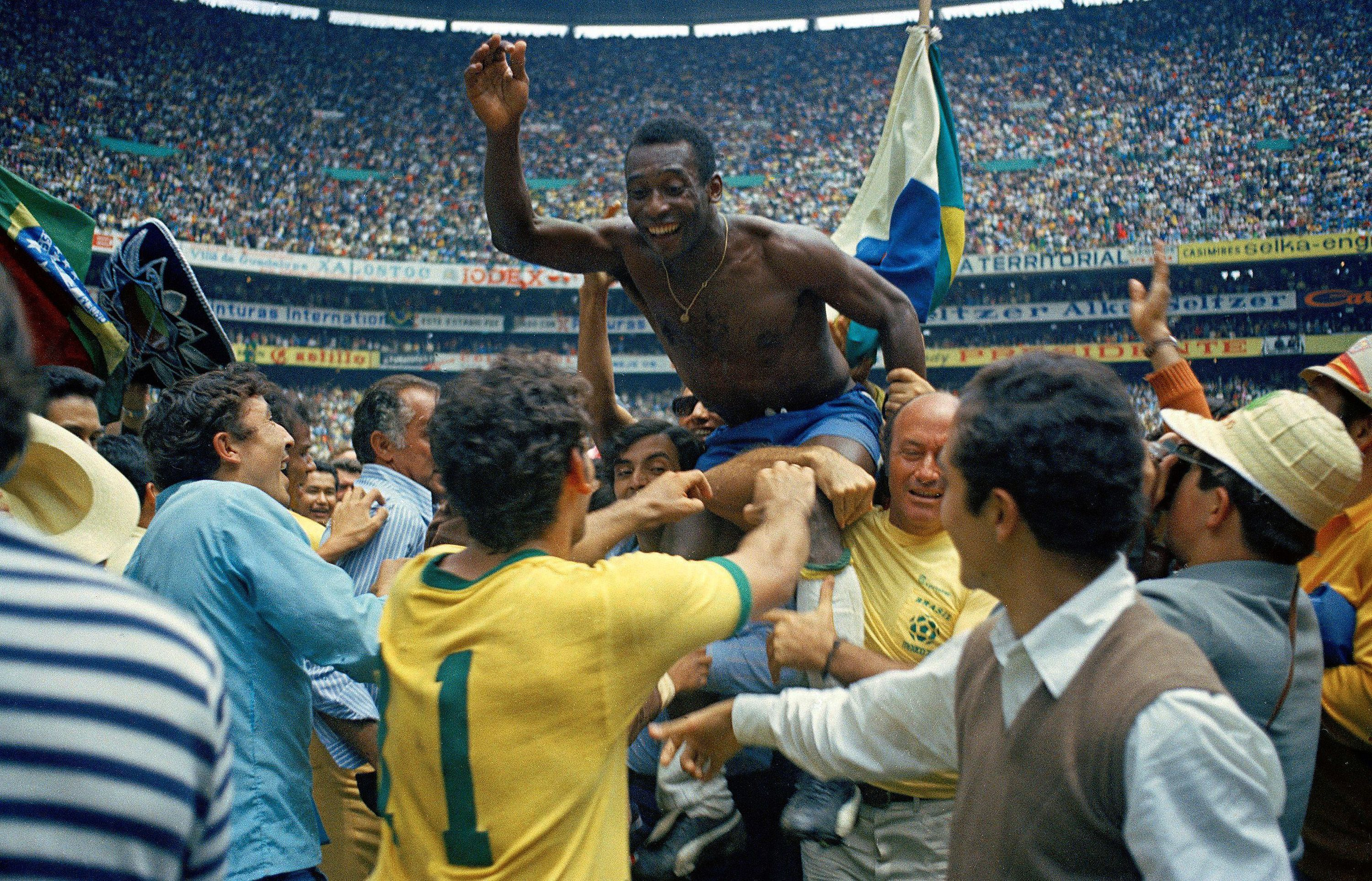
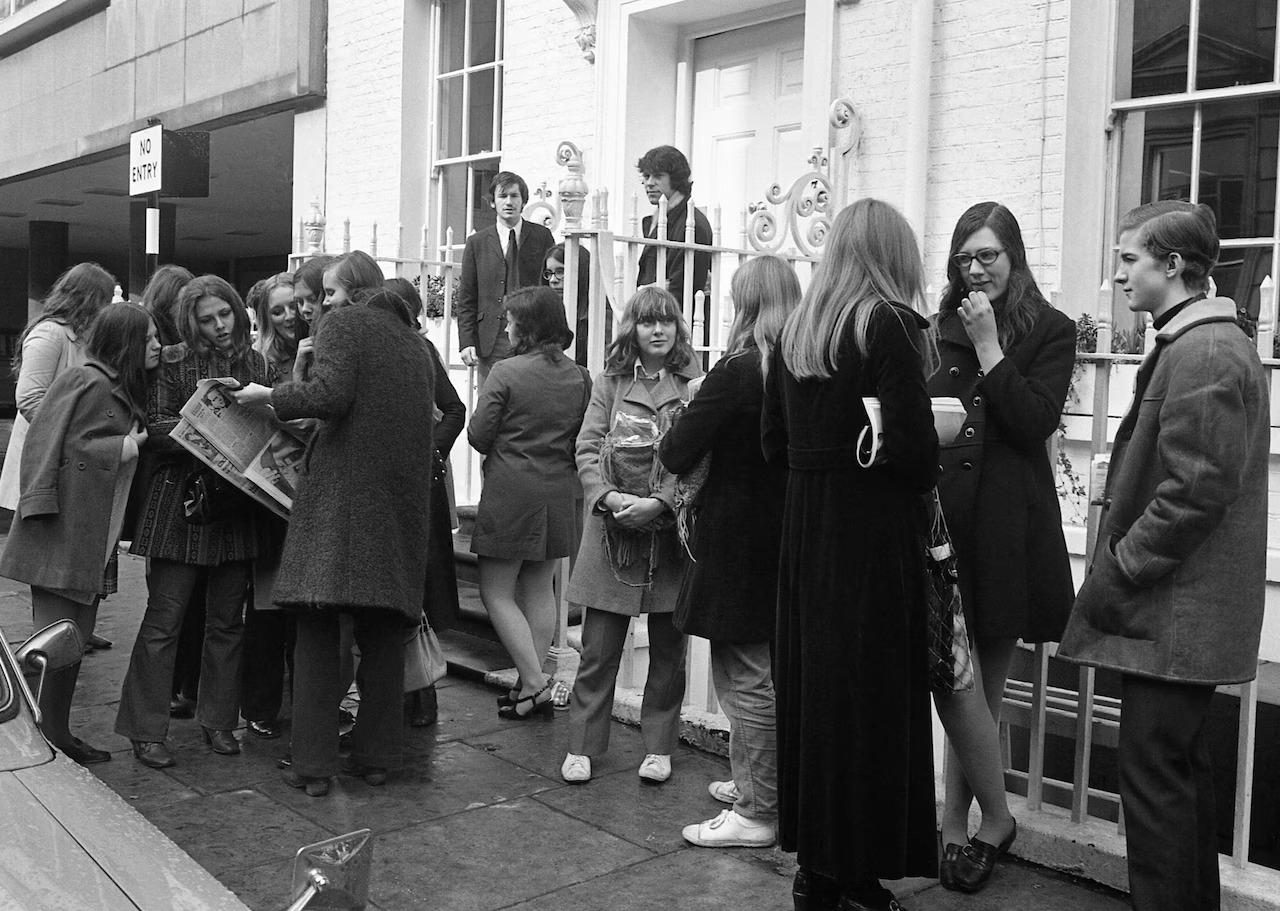
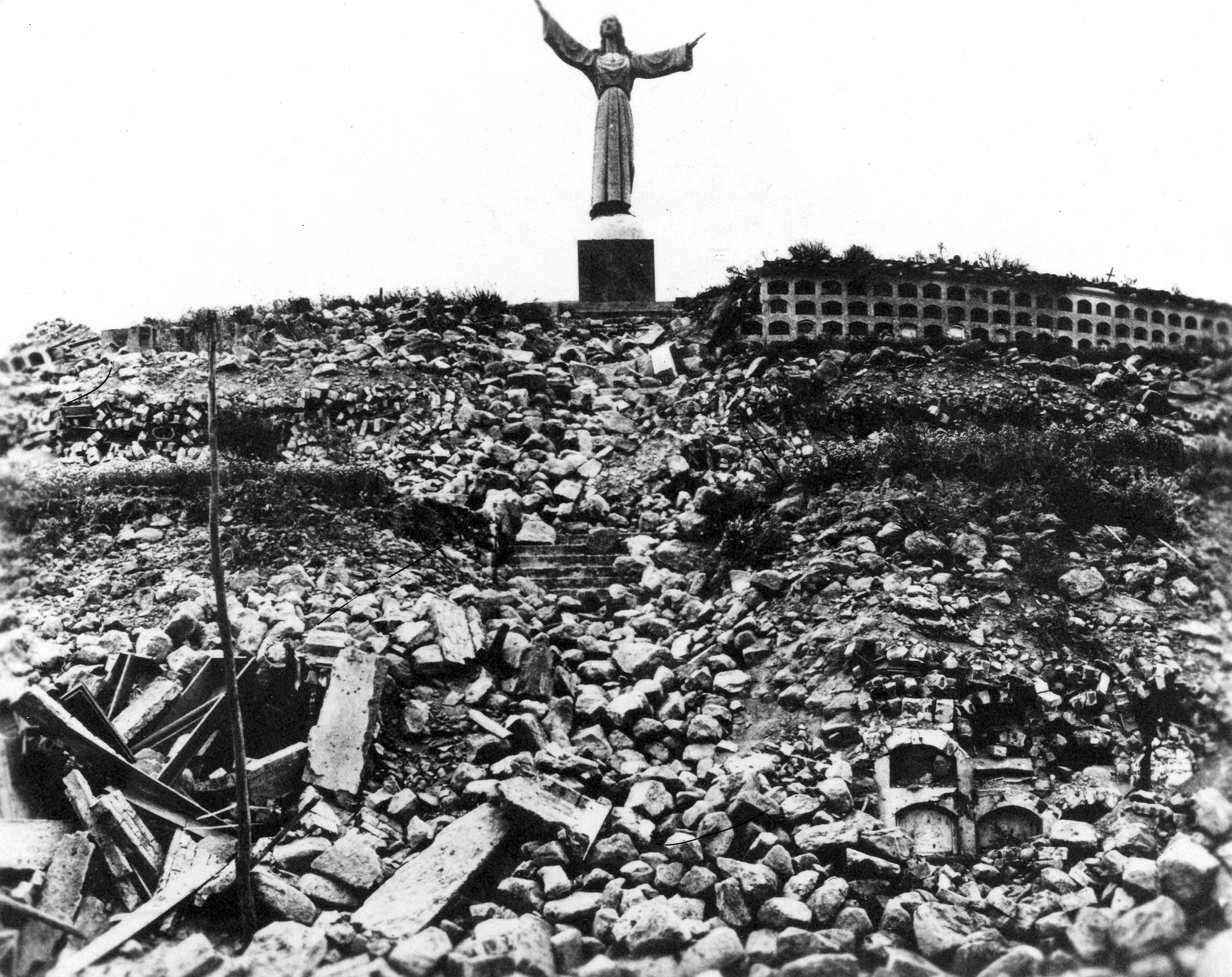
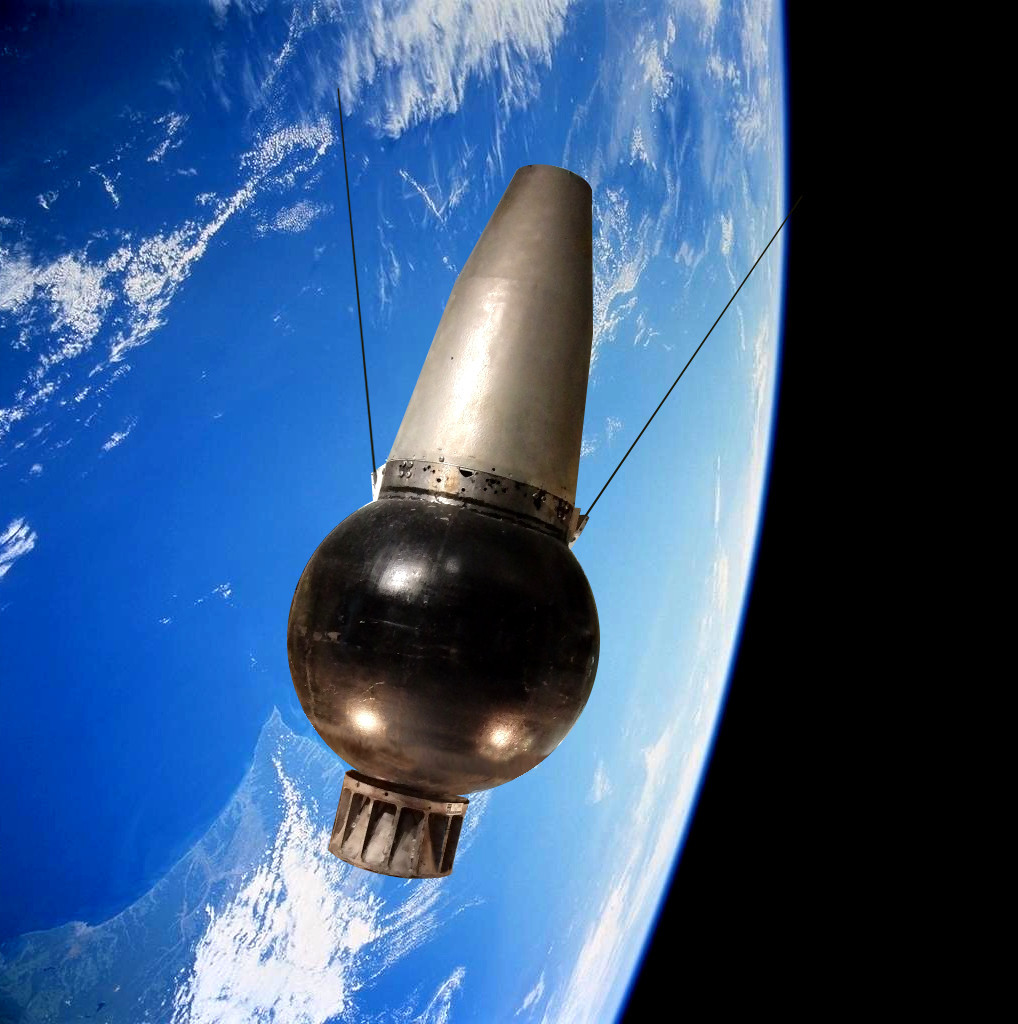
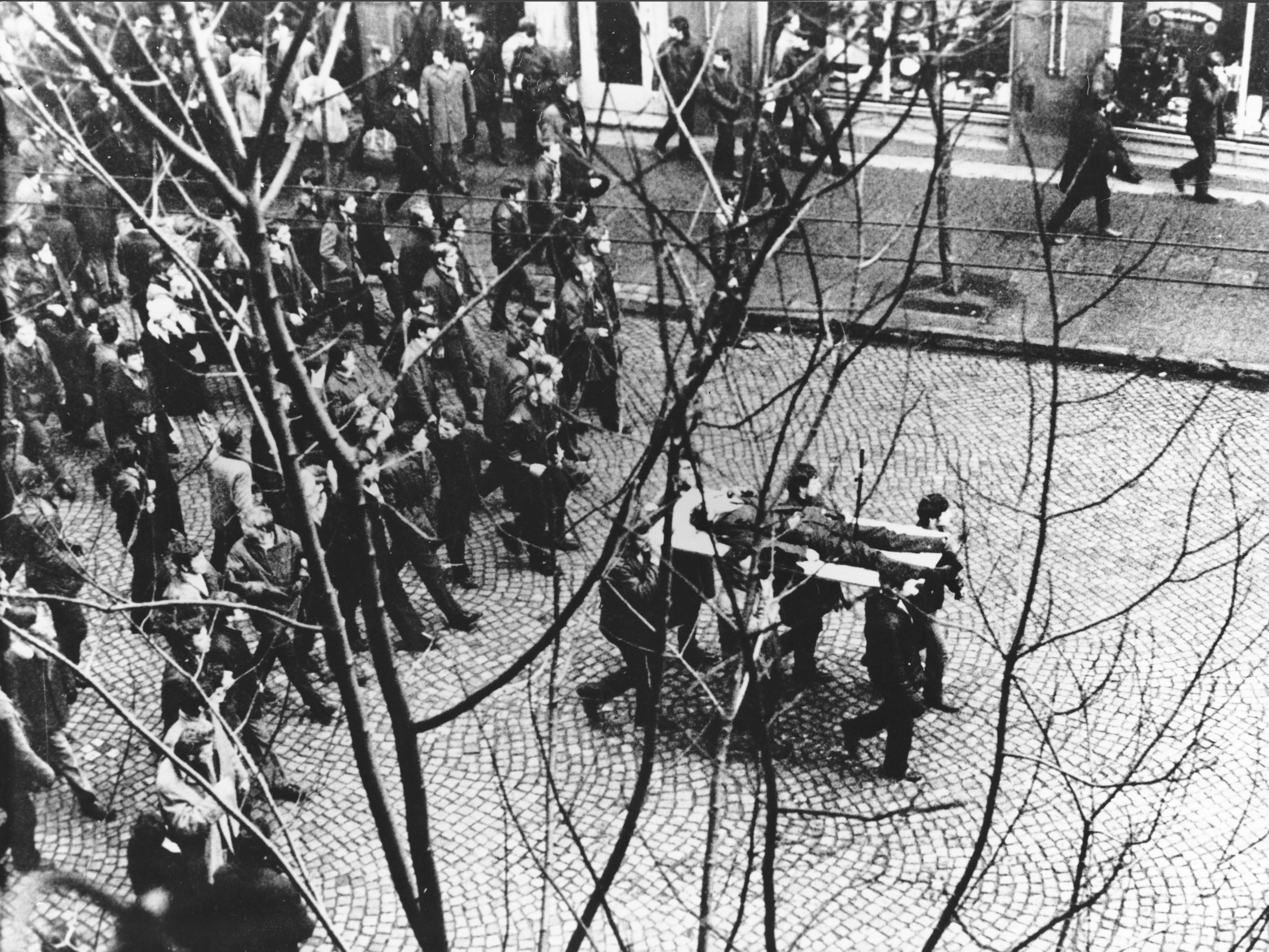
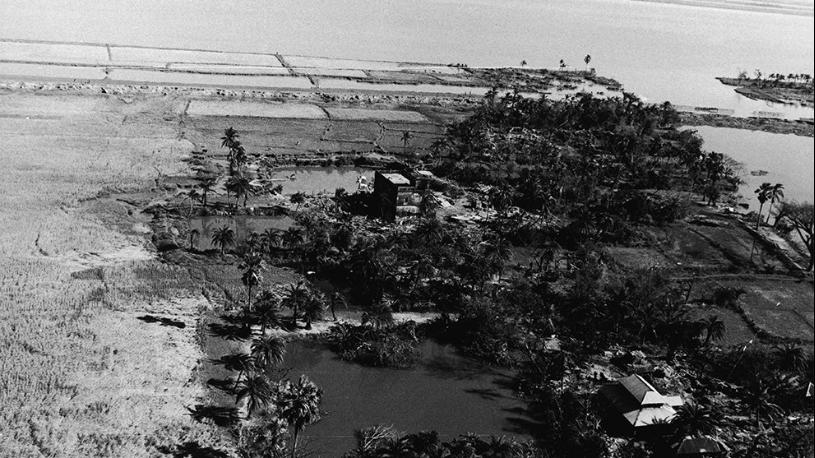
From top to bottom, left to right: Apollo 13 suffers a near-fatal malfunction but returns safely; the Kent State shootings kill four students and trigger nationwide outrage; the 1970 FIFA World Cup in Mexico crowns Brazil champions for the third time; the break-up of the Beatles becomes official with Paul McCartney’s departure; the 1970 Ancash earthquake and 1970 Huascarán debris avalanche kill tens of thousands in Peru; the Dawson's Field hijackings shock the world as multiple planes are seized; Ohsumi marks Japan’s first satellite launch; the 1970 Polish protests erupt over economic hardship; and the 1970 Bhola cyclone devastates East Pakistan, becoming the deadliest cyclone ever recorded.

1970 (MCMLXX) was a common year starting on Thursday of the Gregorian calendar, the 1970th year of the Common Era (CE) and Anno Domini (AD) designations, the 970th year of the 2nd millennium, the 70th year of the 20th century, and the 1st year of the 1970s decade.

The year 1970 had two solar eclipses (March 7 and August 31) and two partial lunar eclipses (February 21 and August 17).

== Events ==
=== January ===
- January 5 – The 7.1 M_{w} Tonghai earthquake shakes Tonghai County, Yunnan province, China, with a maximum Mercalli intensity of X (Extreme). Between 10,000 and 14,621 are killed and 30,000 injured.
- January 15 – After a 32-month fight for independence from Nigeria, Biafran forces under Philip Effiong formally surrender to General Yakubu Gowon, ending the Nigerian Civil War.

=== February ===
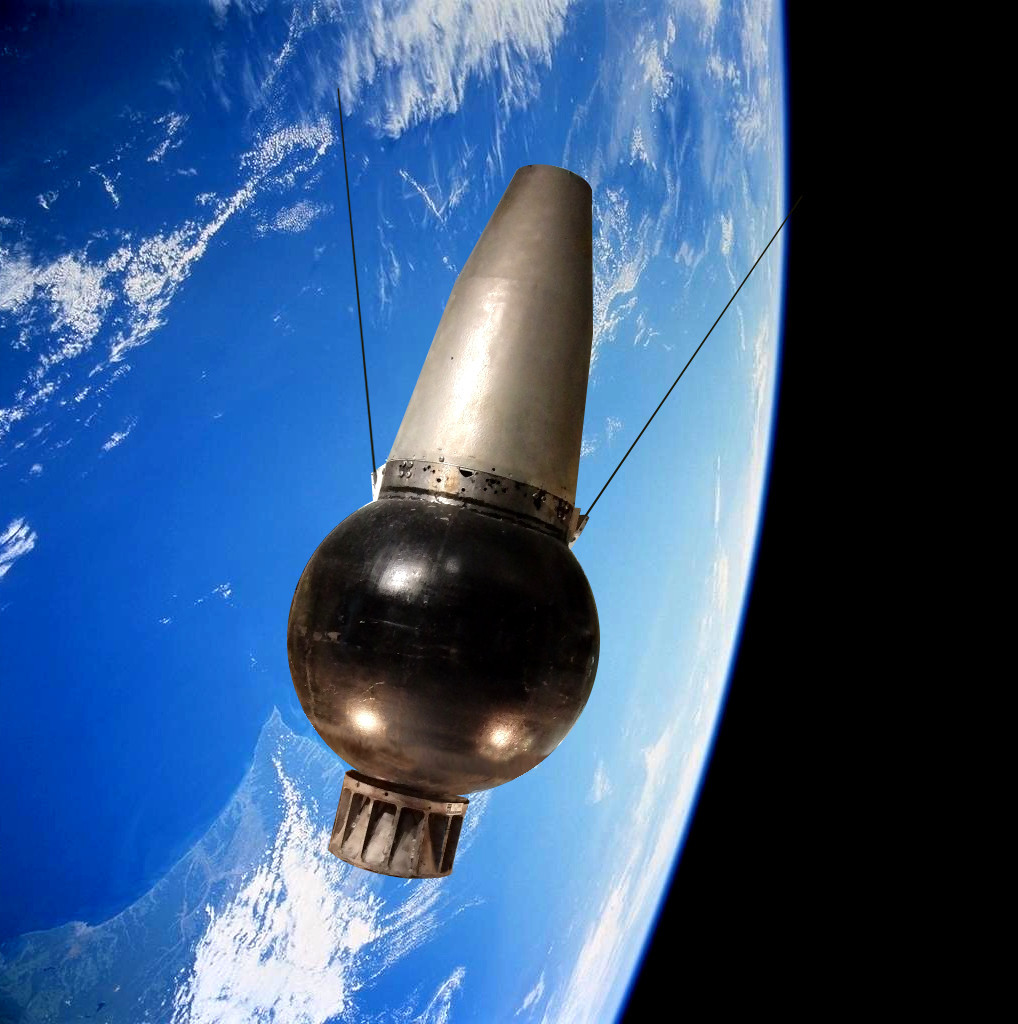
February 11: Ohsumi (satellite) launched

- February 1 – The Benavídez rail disaster near Buenos Aires, Argentina (a rear-end collision) kills 236.
- February 10 – An avalanche at Val-d'Isère, France, kills 41 tourists.
- February 11 – Ohsumi, Japan's first satellite, is launched on a Lambda-4 rocket.
- February 22 – Guyana becomes a Republic within the Commonwealth of Nations.
- February – Multi-business conglomerate Virgin Group is founded as a discount mail-order record retailer by Richard Branson in the UK.

=== March ===
- March 1 – Rhodesia's white minority government severs its last tie with the United Kingdom, declaring itself a republic.
- March 4 – All 57 men aboard the French submarine Eurydice are killed when the vessel implodes while making a practice dive in the Mediterranean Sea.
- March 5 – The Nuclear Non-Proliferation Treaty goes into effect, after ratification by 56 nations.
- March 6 – Süleyman Demirel of AP forms the new government of Turkey (32nd government).
- March 12 – Citroën introduces the Citroën SM, the world's fastest front-wheel drive auto at this time, at the annual Geneva Motor Show in Switzerland.
- March 15 – The Expo '70 World's Fair opens in Suita, Osaka, Japan.
- March 16 – The complete New English Bible is published in the UK.
- March 18 – General Lon Nol ousts Prince Norodom Sihanouk of Cambodia and holds Queen Sisowath Kossamak under house arrest.
- March 19 – Ostpolitik: The leaders of West Germany and East Germany meet at a summit for the first time since Germany's division into two republics. West German Chancellor Willy Brandt is greeted by cheering East German crowds as he arrives in Erfurt for a summit with his counterpart, East German Ministerpräsident Willi Stoph.
- March 20 – The Agence de Coopération Culturelle et Technique (ACCT) is founded.
- March 21 – "All Kinds of Everything", sung by Dana (music and lyrics by Derry Lindsay and Jackie Smith), wins the Eurovision Song Contest 1970 (staged in Amsterdam) for Ireland.
- March 31
  - NASA's Explorer 1, the first American satellite and Explorer program spacecraft, reenters Earth's atmosphere after 12 years in orbit.
  - Japan Airlines Flight 351, carrying 131 passengers and 7 crew from Tokyo to Fukuoka, is hijacked by Japanese Red Army members. All passengers and crew are eventually freed.

=== April ===
- April 4 – Fragments of burnt human remains believed to be those of Adolf Hitler, Eva Braun, Joseph Goebbels, Magda Goebbels and the Goebbels children are crushed and scattered in the Biederitz river at a KGB center in Magdeburg, East Germany.
- April 8
  - A huge gas explosion at a subway construction site in Osaka, Japan, kills 79 and injures over 400.
  - Israeli Air Force F-4 Phantom II fighter bombers kill 47 Egyptian school children at an elementary school in what is known as Bahr el-Baqar massacre. The single-floor school is hit by five bombs and two air-to-ground missiles.
- April 10 – In a press release written in mock-interview style, that is included in promotional copies of his first solo album, Paul McCartney announces that he has left The Beatles.
- April 11
  - An avalanche at a tuberculosis sanatorium in the French Alps kills 74, mostly young boys.
  - Apollo program: Apollo 13 (Jim Lovell, Fred Haise, Jack Swigert) is launched from the United States toward the Moon.
- April 13 – An oxygen tank in the Apollo 13 spacecraft explodes, forcing the crew to abort the mission and return in four days.
- April 15 - The Apollo 13 crew sets the record for the farthest humans have traveled, 400,171 miles (644,013 km), which would stand until the Artemis II lunar flyby in 2026.
- April 17 – Apollo 13 splashes down safely in the Pacific.
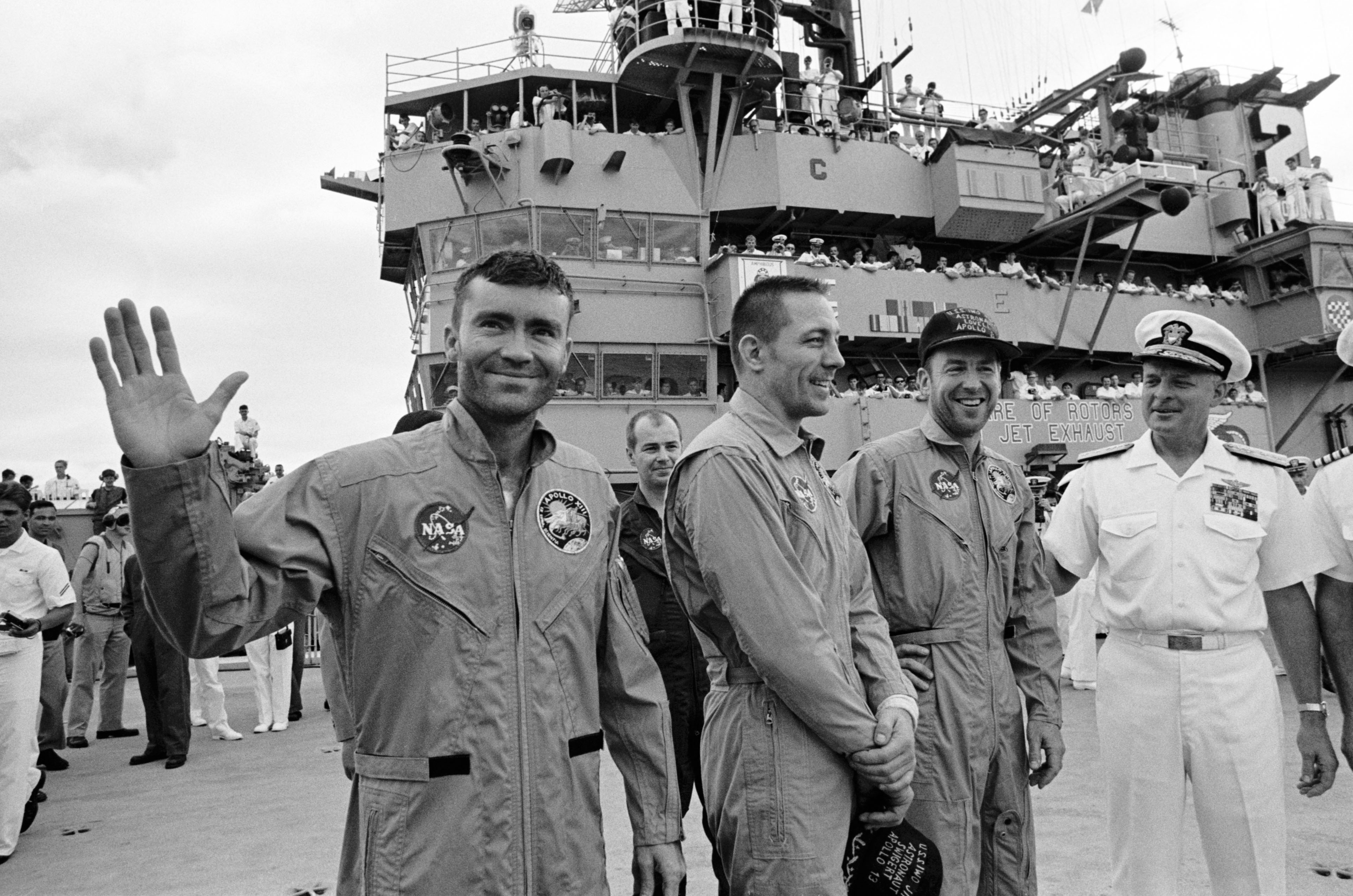
  April 17: Apollo 13 crew after splashdown
- April 21 – The Principality of Hutt River "secedes" from Australia (it remained unrecognised by Australia and other nations, and is dissolved in 2020).
- April 24 – China's first satellite (Dong Fang Hong 1) is launched into orbit using a Long March-1 Rocket (CZ-1).
- April 26 – The World Intellectual Property Organization (WIPO) is founded.
- April 29 – Cambodian campaign: The U.S. incursion into Cambodia begins.

=== May ===
- May 4 – Kent State shootings: Four students at Kent State University in Ohio, are killed and nine wounded by Ohio National Guardsmen at a protest against the U.S. incursion into Cambodia.
- May 6
  - Arms Crisis in the Republic of Ireland: Charles Haughey and Neil Blaney are dismissed as members of the Irish Government for accusations of their involvement in a plot to import arms for use by the Provisional Irish Republican Army in Northern Ireland.
  - Feyenoord win the European Cup in association football after a 2–1 win over Celtic.
- May 11 – Lubbock tornado: A strong, multi-vortex F5 tornado impacts areas of Lubbock, Texas, after dark, resulting in 26 fatalities and over 1,500 injuries.
- May 14
  - Ulrike Meinhof helps Andreas Baader escape and create the Red Army Faction in West Germany which exists until 1998.
  - Jackson State killings: In the second day of violent demonstrations at Jackson State University in Jackson, Mississippi, state law enforcement officers fire into the demonstrators, killing 2 and injuring 12.
- May 17 – Thor Heyerdahl sets sail from Morocco on the papyrus boat Ra II, to cross the South Atlantic.
- May 26 – The Soviet Tupolev Tu-144 becomes the first commercial transport to exceed Mach 2.
- May 31
  - The 7.9 M_{w} Ancash earthquake shakes Peru with a maximum Mercalli intensity of VIII (Severe) and a landslide buries the town of Yungay, Peru. Between 66,794 and 70,000 are killed and 50,000 injured.
  - The 1970 FIFA World Cup in association football is inaugurated in Mexico. Tactical substitutes are first permitted.

=== June ===
- June 1
  - Soyuz 9, a two-man spacecraft, is launched from the Soviet Union for an orbital flight of nearly 18 days, an endurance record at this time.
  - Assassination of Pedro Eugenio Aramburu: Former de facto President of Argentina is extrajudicially executed by Montoneros three days after being kidnapped from his Buenos Aires apartment.
- June 4 – Tonga gains independence from the United Kingdom.
- June 8 – A coup in Argentina brings a new junta of service chiefs; on June 18, Roberto M. Levingston becomes President.
- June 12 – National Democratic Front for the Liberation of Oman and the Arabian Gulf guerrillas attack military garrisons at Izki and Nizwa in Oman.
- June 19 – The Patent Cooperation Treaty is signed into international law, providing a unified procedure for filing patent applications to protect inventions.
- June 21
  - Brazil defeats Italy 4–1 to win the 1970 FIFA World Cup in Mexico. As 3-times winner, they keep the Jules Rimet Trophy permanently (but it is subsequently stolen and lost).
  - Penn Central, America's largest railroad, files for chapter 77 bankruptcy; the largest U.S. corporate bankruptcy at this time.

=== July ===
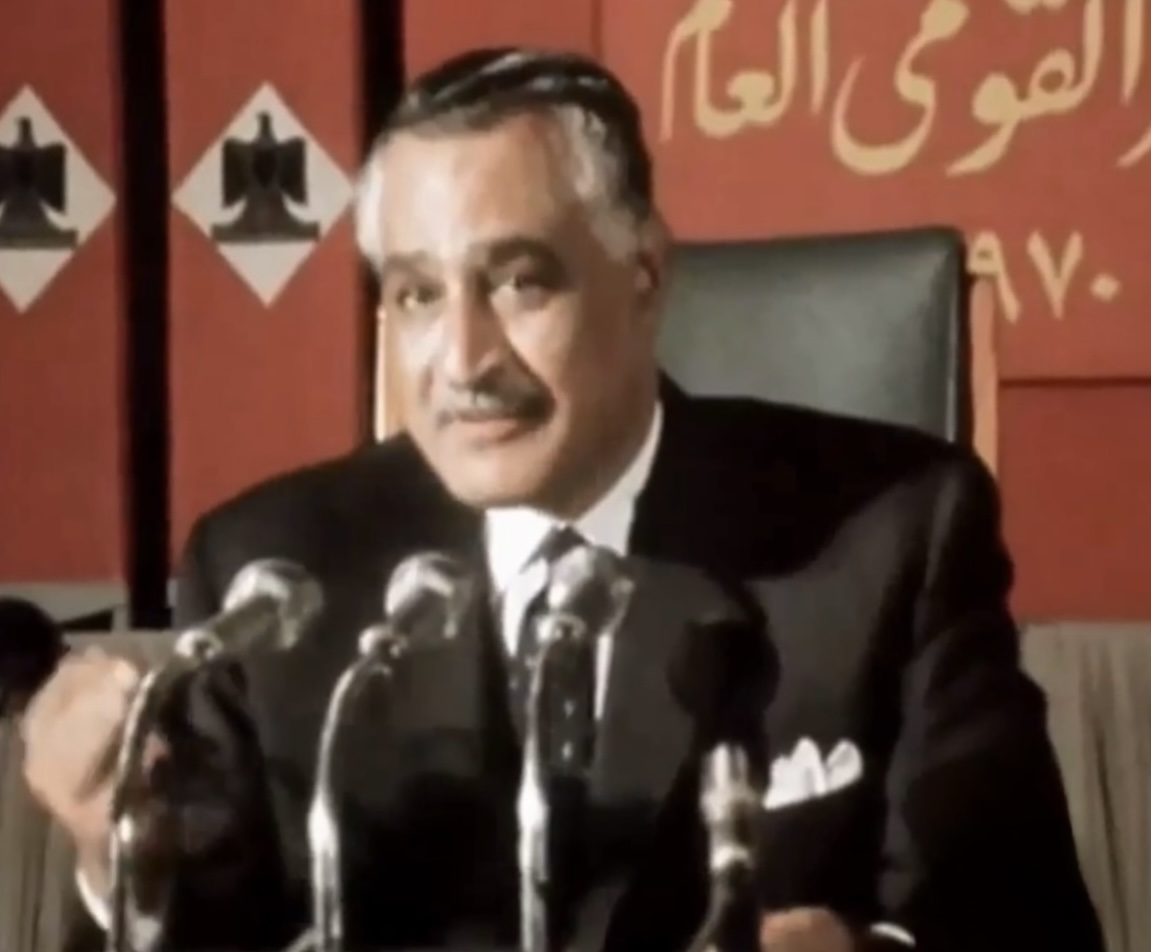
Egyptian President Gamal Abdel Nasser delivering his final public speech, July 23, 1970

- July 1 – Xerox PARC computer laboratory opens in Palo Alto, California, United States.
- July 3
  - All 112 people on board Dan-Air Flight 1903 are killed when the chartered British De Havilland Comet crashes into mountains north of Barcelona through navigational error.
  - The French Army detonates a 914 kiloton thermonuclear device in the Mururoa Atoll. It is the fifth in a series that started on June 15 in their program to perfect a hydrogen bomb small enough to be delivered by a missile.
- July 5 – Air Canada Flight 621 crashes near Toronto International Airport, Toronto, Ontario through pilot error; all 109 passengers and crew are killed.
- July 12 – Thor Heyerdahl's papyrus boat Ra II arrives in Barbados.
- July 16 - Three Rivers Stadium opens in Pittsburgh Pennsylvania, home to NFL Steelers and MLB Pirates.
- July 21 – The Aswan High Dam in Egypt is completed.
- July 23 – 1970 Omani coup d'état: Said bin Taimur, Sultan of Muscat and Oman, is deposed in a bloodless palace coup by his son, Qaboos, with covert British support. Among the reforms he introduces is the abolition of chattel slavery in Oman.
- July 30 – Thalidomide scandal: Damages totalling £485,528 are awarded to 28 Thalidomide victims in the UK.
- July 31 – Black Tot Day, the last daily distribution of one-eighth of an imperial pint of rum to sailors of the British Royal Navy, an amount that had been dispensed since 1866.

=== August ===
- August 11 – Creation of the International Council of Organizations of Folklore Festivals and Folk Arts in Confolens, France.
- August 17 – Venera program: Venera 7 is launched from the Soviet Union toward Venus. It later becomes the first spacecraft to transmit data from the surface of another planet successfully.
- August 31 – Solar eclipse of August 31, 1970: An annular solar eclipse is visible in Oceania, and is the 14th solar eclipse of Solar Saros 144.

=== September ===
- September 1 – An assassination attempt against King Hussein of Jordan precipitates the country's Black September crisis.
- September 3–6 – Israeli forces fight Palestinian guerillas in southern Lebanon.
- September 4
  - Chilean Socialist Senator Salvador Allende wins 36.2% of the vote in his run for presidency defeating former right-wing President Jorge Alessandri with 34.9% of the votes and Christian Democrat Radomiro Tomic with 27.8% of the votes.
  - Soviet Russian prima ballerina Natalia Makarova defects to the West while on tour with the Kirov Ballet in London.
- September 5 – Vietnam War: Operation Jefferson Glenn: The United States 101st Airborne Division and the South Vietnamese 1st Infantry Division initiate a new operation in Thua Thien Province (the operation ends in October 1971).
- September 6 – Dawson's Field hijackings: The Popular Front for the Liberation of Palestine hijacks four passenger aircraft from Pan Am, TWA and Swissair on flights to New York from Brussels, Frankfurt and Zurich and flies them to a desert airstrip in Jordan.
- September 7:
  - Fighting breaks out between Arab guerillas and government forces in Amman, Jordan.
  - Vietnam Television was established.
- September 8–10 – The Jordanian government and Palestinian guerillas make repeated unsuccessful truces.
- September 9 – Guinea recognizes the German Democratic Republic.
- September 10 – Cambodian government forces break the siege of Kompong Thom after three months.
- September 15 – King Hussein of Jordan forms a military government with Muhammad Daoud as the prime minister.
- September 16 – Death of Jimi Hendrix: American rock musician Jimi Hendrix gives his last public performance, two days before his drug-related death in London.
- September 17 – Black September: King Hussein of Jordan orders the Jordanian Armed Forces to oust Palestinian fedayeen from Jordan.
- September 19 – Kostas Georgakis, a Greek student of geology, sets himself ablaze in Matteotti Square in Genoa, Italy, as a protest against the dictatorial Greek junta led by Georgios Papadopoulos.
- September 20
  - Syrian armored forces cross the Jordanian border.
  - Luna 16 lands on the Moon and lifts off the next day with samples, landing back on Earth September 24.
- September 21 – Palestinian armed forces reinforce guerillas in Irbidi, Jordan.
- September 22
  - The International Hydrographic Organization (IHO) is founded.
  - Tunku Abdul Rahman resigns as prime minister of Malaysia, and is succeeded by his deputy Tun Abdul Razak.
- September 27
  - Richard Nixon begins a tour of Europe, visiting Italy, Yugoslavia, Spain, the United Kingdom and Republic of Ireland.
  - Pope Paul VI names Saint Teresa of Ávila (d. 1582) as the first female Doctor of the Church.
- September 28 – Vice President Anwar Sadat is named temporary president of Egypt following the death of Gamal Abdel Nasser.
- September 29 – In Berlin, Red Army Faction members rob three banks, with loot totaling over DM 200,000.

=== October ===
- October 2 – The Wichita State University football team's "Gold" plane crashes in Colorado, killing most of the players. They were on their way (along with administrators and fans) to a game with Utah State University.
- October 3
  - In Lebanon, the government of Prime Minister Rashid Karami resigns.
  - The National Oceanic and Atmospheric Administration (NOAA) is formed in the United States and the Weather Bureau is renamed to National Weather Service as part of NOAA.
  - Pope Paul VI names Saint Catherine of Siena (d. 1380) as the second female Doctor of the Church.
- October 4
  - Jochen Rindt becomes Formula One World Driving Champion, the first to earn the honor posthumously.
  - In Bolivia, Army Commander General Rogelio Miranda and a group of officers rebel and demand the resignation of President Alfredo Ovando Candía, who dismisses him.
  - American rock singer Janis Joplin is found dead of an overdose, age 27, in her hotel room in Hollywood.
- October 5 – The Front de libération du Québec (FLQ) kidnaps British trade commissioner James Cross in Montreal and demands release of all imprisoned FLQ members, beginning Quebec's October Crisis. The next day the Canadian government announces that it will not meet the demand.
- October 6 – Bolivian President Alfredo Ovando Candía resigns; General Rogelio Miranda takes over but resigns soon after.
- October 7 – General Juan José Torres becomes the new President of Bolivia.
- October 8
  - The U.S. Foreign Office announces the renewal of arms sales to Pakistan.
  - Vietnam War: In Paris, a Communist delegation rejects U.S. President Richard Nixon's peace proposal as "a maneuver to deceive world opinion."
- October 9 – The Khmer Republic is proclaimed in Cambodia, escalating the Cambodian Civil War between the government and the Khmer Rouge.
- October 10
  - Fiji becomes independent.
  - October Crisis: In Montreal, Quebec Minister of Labour Pierre Laporte becomes the second statesman kidnapped by members of the FLQ terrorist group.
- October 11 – Eleven French soldiers are killed in a shootout with rebels in Chad.
- October 12 – Vietnam War: U.S. President Richard Nixon announces that the United States will withdraw 40,000 more troops before Christmas.
- October 13 – Saeb Salam forms a government in Lebanon.
- October 14 – A Chinese nuclear test is conducted in Lop Nor.
- October 15
  - A section of the new West Gate Bridge in Melbourne collapses into the river below, killing 35 construction workers.
  - In Egypt, a referendum supports Anwar Sadat 90.04%.
- October 16 – October Crisis: The Canadian government declares a state of emergency and outlaws the Quebec Liberation Front.
- October 17
  - October Crisis: Quebec politician Pierre Laporte is found murdered by the FLQ in south Montreal.
  - A cholera epidemic breaks out in Istanbul.
  - Anwar Sadat officially becomes President of Egypt.
- October 20
  - The Soviet Union launches the Zond 8 lunar probe.
  - New Egyptian president Anwar Sadat names Mahmoud Fawzi as his prime minister.
- October 22 – Chilean army commander René Schneider is shot in Santiago; the government declares a state of emergency. Schneider dies October 25.
- October 24 – Salvador Allende is elected President of Chile by a run-off vote in the National Congress
- October 25 – The wreck of the Confederate submarine Hunley is found off Charleston, South Carolina, by 22-year-old pioneer underwater archaeologist, Dr. E. Lee Spence. Hunley is the first submarine in history to sink a ship in warfare.
- October 28
  - In Jordan, the government of Ahmad Toukan resigns; the next prime minister is Wasfi al-Tal.
  - A cholera outbreak in eastern Slovakia causes Hungary to close its border with Czechoslovakia.
  - Gary Gabelich drives the rocket-powered Blue Flame (part fuelled by LNG) to an official land speed record of 622.407 mph (1,001.667 km/h) on the dry lake bed of the Bonneville Salt Flats in Utah. The record, the first above 1,000 km/h, stands for nearly 13 years.
- October 30 – In Vietnam, the worst monsoon to hit the area in six years causes large floods, kills 293, leaves 200,000 homeless and virtually halts the Vietnam War.

=== November ===
- November 1
  - The Club Cinq-Sept fire in Saint-Laurent-du-Pont, France, kills 146.
  - Polish Deputy Foreign Minister Zygfryd Wolniak and three Pakistanis are killed in an attack on a group of Polish diplomats at the Karachi airport.
- November 3
  - Salvador Allende takes office as president of Chile.
  - The 1970 Bhola cyclone makes landfall in modern-day Bangladesh around high tide, causing $86.4 million in damage (1970 USD, $576 million 2020 USD) and becomes the world's deadliest storm killing over 500,000 people.
- November 5 – Vietnam War: The United States Military Assistance Command in Vietnam reports the lowest weekly American soldier death toll in five years (24 soldiers die this week, which is the fifth consecutive week the death toll is below 50; 431 are reported wounded in the week, however).
- November 8 – Egypt, Libya and Sudan announce their intentions to form a federation.
- November 9
  - The Soviet Union launches Luna 17 for the moon.
  - Vietnam War: The Supreme Court of the United States votes 6–3 not to hear a case by the state of Massachusetts about the constitutionality of a state law granting Massachusetts residents the right to refuse military service in an undeclared war.
- November 13
  - 1970 Bhola cyclone: A 120-mph (193 km/h) tropical cyclone hits the densely populated Ganges Delta region of East Pakistan (modern-day Bangladesh), killing an estimated 500,000 people (considered the 20th century's worst cyclone disaster). It gives rise to the temporary island of New Moore / South Talpatti.
  - Hafez al-Assad comes to power in Syria, following a military coup within the Ba'ath Party.
- November 14
  - Southern Airways Flight 932 crashes in Wayne County, West Virginia; all 75 on board, including 37 players and 5 coaches from the Marshall University football team, are killed.
  - The Soviet Union enters the International Civil Aviation Organization, after having resisted joining the UN Agency for more than 25 years. Russian becomes the fourth official language of the ICAO.
- November 16 – The Lockheed L-1011 TriStar flies for the first time.
- November 17 – Luna programme: The Soviet Union lands Lunokhod 1 on Mare Imbrium (Sea of Rains) on the Moon. This is the first roving remote-controlled robot to land on another world, and is released by the orbiting Luna 17 spacecraft.
- November 19 – The six European Economic Community nation prime ministers meet in Munich to begin the new programme of European Political Cooperation (EPC), a unified foreign policy for a future European Union.
- November 20 – The Miss World 1970 beauty pageant, hosted by Bob Hope at the Royal Albert Hall, London is disrupted by Women's Liberation protesters. Earlier on the same evening a bomb is placed under a BBC outside broadcast vehicle by The Angry Brigade, in protest at the entry of separate black and white contestants by South Africa.
- November 21
  - Syrian Prime Minister Hafez al-Assad forms a new government but retains the post of defense minister.
  - In Ethiopia, the Eritrean Liberation Front kills an Ethiopian general.
  - Vietnam War – Operation Ivory Coast: A joint Air Force and Army team raids the 4Sơn Tây prison camp in an attempt to free American prisoners of war thought to be held there (no Americans are killed, but the prisoners have already moved to another camp; all U.S. POWs are moved to a handful of central prison complexes as a result of this raid).
  - 1970 Australian Senate election: The Liberal/Country Coalition government led by Prime Minister John Gorton and the Labor Party led by Gough Whitlam each end up with 26 seats, both suffering a swing against them. The Democratic Labor Party wins an additional seat and holds the balance of power in the Senate. This is the last occasion on which a Senate election is held without an accompanying House of Representatives election.
- November 22 – Guinean president Ahmed Sékou Touré accuses Portugal of an attack when hundreds of mercenaries land near the capital Conakry. The Guinean army repels the landing attempts over the next three days.
- November 25–29 – A U.N. delegation arrives to investigate the Guinea situation.
- November 25 – In Tokyo, author and Tatenokai militia leader Yukio Mishima and his followers take over the headquarters of the Japan Self-Defense Forces in an attempted coup d'état. After Mishima's speech fails to sway public opinion towards his right-wing political beliefs, including restoration of the powers of the Emperor, he commits seppuku (public ritual suicide).
- November 27 – Bolivian artist Benjamin Mendoza tries to assassinate Pope Paul VI during his visit in Manila.
- November 28 – The Montreal Alouettes defeat the Calgary Stampeders, 23–10, to win the 58th Grey Cup in Canadian football.

=== December ===
- December 1
  - The Italian Chamber of Deputies accepts a new divorce law.
  - Ethiopia recognizes the People's Republic of China.
  - The Basque ETA (separatist group) kidnaps West German Eugen Beihl in San Sebastián.
  - Luis Echeverría becomes president of Mexico.
- December 2 – The United States Environmental Protection Agency is established.
- December 3
  - October Crisis: In Montreal, kidnapped British trade commissioner James Cross is released by the Front de libération du Québec terrorist group after being held hostage for 60 days. Police negotiate his release and in return the Government of Canada grants 5 terrorists from the FLQ's Chenier Cell their request for safe passage to Cuba.
  - Burgos Trial: In Burgos, Spain, the trial of 16 Basque terrorism suspects begins.
- December 4
  - The Spanish government declares a 3-month martial law in the Basque county of Guipuzcoa, over strikes and demonstrations.
  - The U.N. announces that Portuguese navy and army units were responsible for the attempted invasion of Guinea.
- December 5
  - The Asian and Australian tour of Pope Paul VI ends.
  - Fluminense win the Brazil Football Championship.
- December 7
  - Giovanni Enrico Bucher, the Swiss ambassador to Brazil, is kidnapped in Rio de Janeiro; kidnappers demand the release of 70 political prisoners.
  - The U.N. General Assembly supports the isolation of South Africa for its apartheid policies.
  - During his visit to the Polish capital, German Chancellor Willy Brandt goes down on his knees in front of a monument to the victims of the Warsaw Ghetto, which will become known as the Warschauer Kniefall ("Warsaw Genuflection").
  - Pakistan's general elections are held.
- December 12 – A landslide in western Colombia leaves 200 dead.
- December 15
  - The USSR's Venera 7 becomes the first spacecraft to land successfully on Venus and transmit data back to Earth.
  - The South Korean ferry Namyong Ho capsizes off Korea Strait; 308 people are killed.
- December 16 – The Ethiopian government declares a state of emergency in the region of Eritrea over the activities of the Eritrean Liberation Front.
- December 20 – An Egyptian delegation leaves for Moscow to ask for economic and military aid.
- December 21 – The Grumman F-14 Tomcat makes its first flight.
- December 22
  - The Libyan Revolutionary Command Council declares that it will nationalize all foreign banks in the country.
  - Franz Stangl, the ex-commander of Treblinka extermination camp, is sentenced to life imprisonment.
- December 23
  - The Bolivian government releases Régis Debray.
  - Law 70-001 is enacted in the Democratic Republic of the Congo, amending article 4 of the constitution and making the country a one-party state.
- December 25 – ETA releases Eugen Beihl in Spain.
- December 27 – President of India V. V. Giri declares new elections.
- December 28 – The suspected killers of Pierre Laporte, Jacques and Paul Rose and Francis Sunard, are arrested near Montreal.
- December 29 – U.S. President Richard Nixon signs into law the Occupational Safety and Health Act.
- December 30
  - In Biscay in the Basque country of Spain, 15,000 go on strike in protest at the Burgos trial death sentences. Francisco Franco commutes the sentences to 30 years in prison.
  - Hurricane Creek mine disaster, near Hyden, Kentucky, USA
- December 31 – Paul McCartney sues in Britain to dissolve The Beatles' legal partnership.

=== Date unknown ===
- The last forced child migration to Australia from the United Kingdom takes place.
- The first Regional Technical Colleges open in Ireland.
- The Sweet Track is discovered in England. It is the world's oldest engineered roadway at the time of its discovery.
- Sammlung zeitgenössischer Kunst der Bundesrepublik Deutschland, the Federal collection of contemporary art, is established in Germany.
- Women's movement starts in Oman with the establishment of the Omani Women's Association.

=== World population ===
World population
	1970	1965		1975	
World	3,692,492,000	3,334,874,000	357,618,000	4,068,109,000	375,617,000
Africa	357,283,000	313,744,000	43,539,000	408,160,000	50,877,000
Asia	2,143,118,000	1,899,424,000	243,694,000	2,397,512,000	254,394,000
Europe	655,855,000	634,026,000	21,829,000	675,542,000	19,687,000
Latin America	284,856,000	250,452,000	34,404,000	321,906,000	37,050,000
North America	231,937,000	219,570,000	12,367,000	243,425,000	11,488,000
Oceania	19,443,000	17,657,000	1,786,000	21,564,000	2,121,000

== Births ==
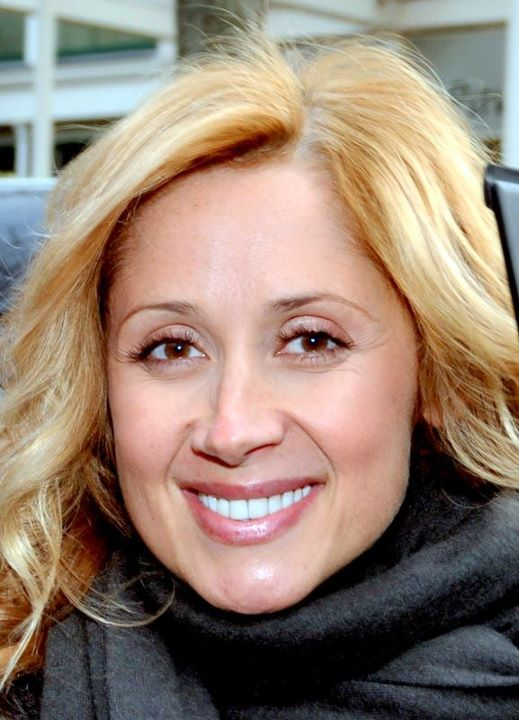
Lara Fabian

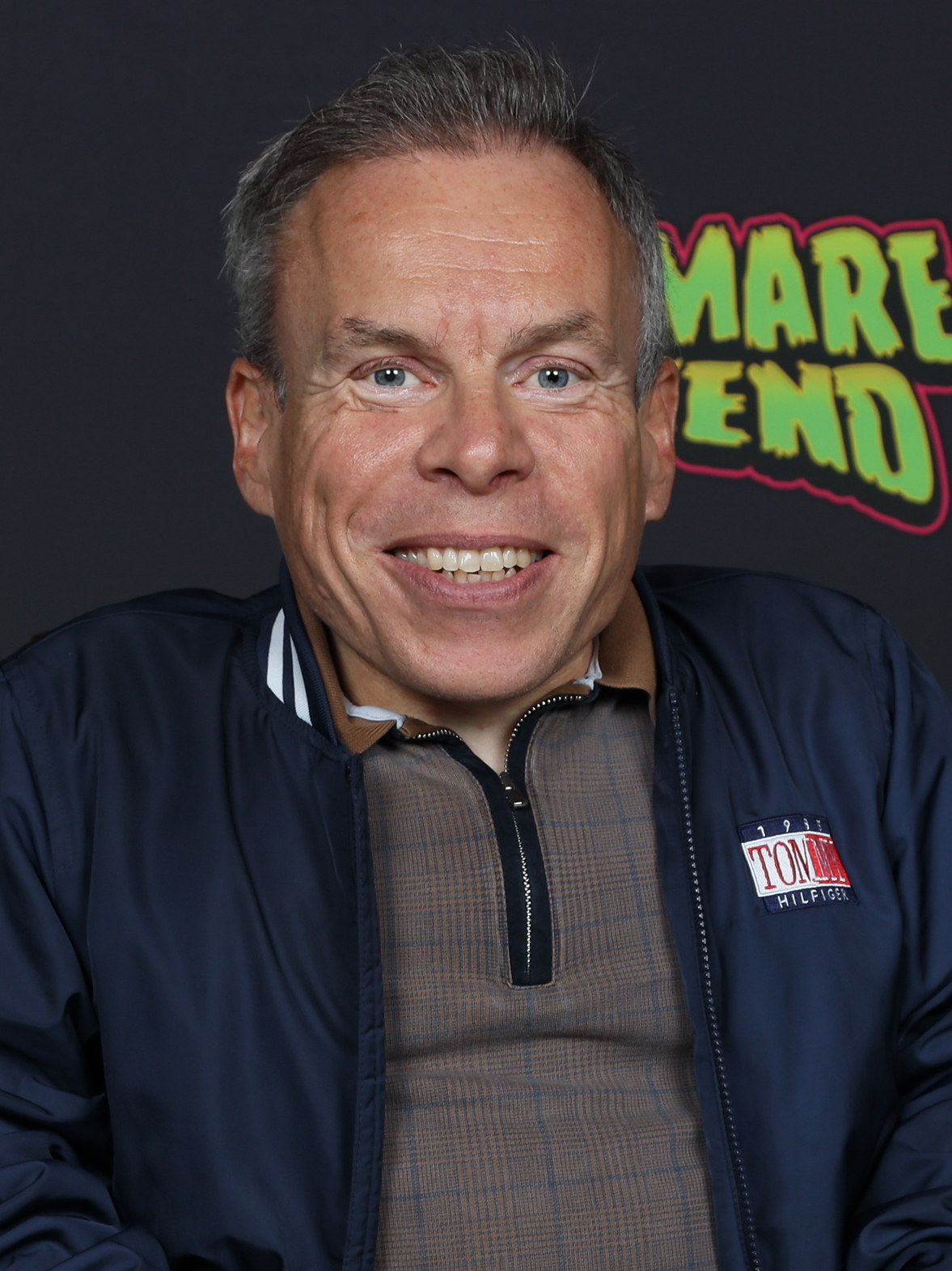
Warwick Davis

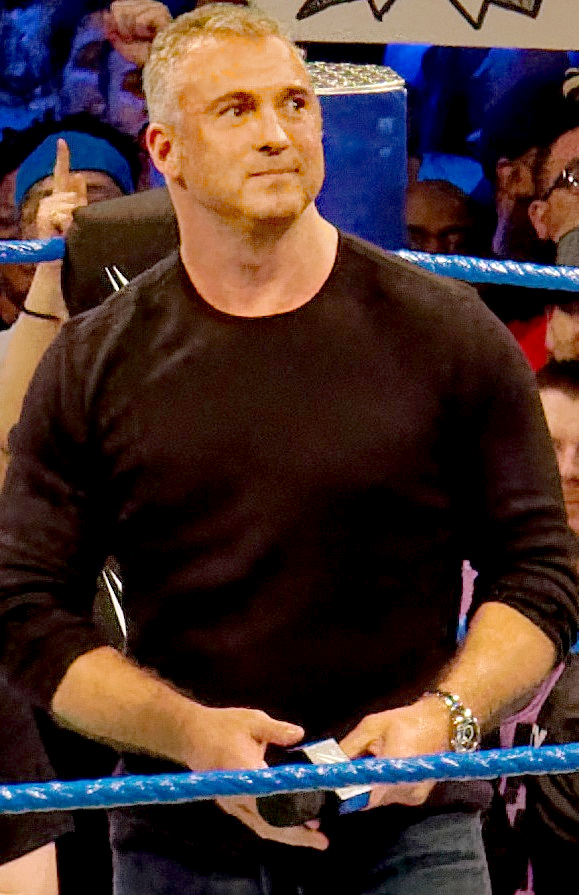
Shane McMahon

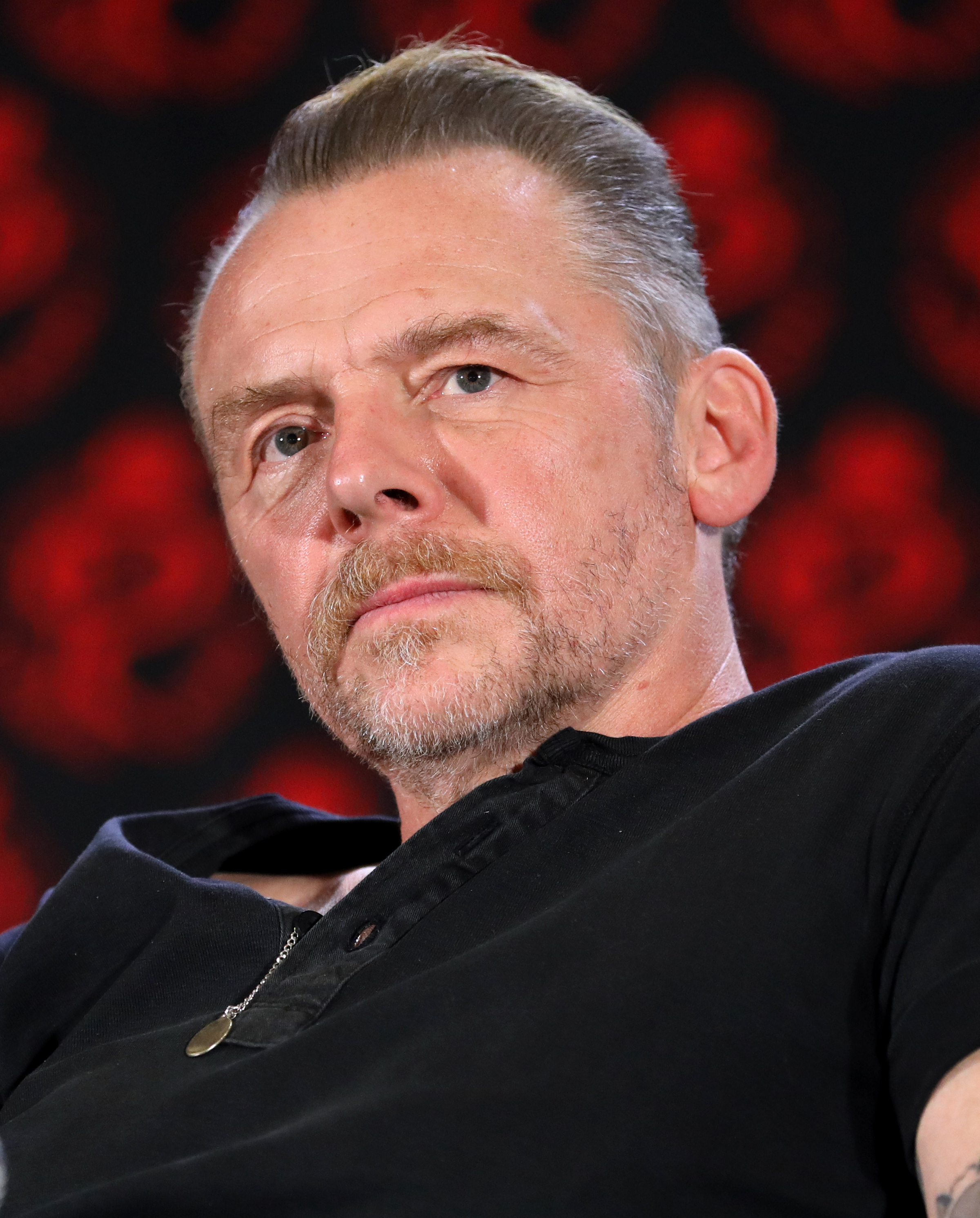
Simon Pegg

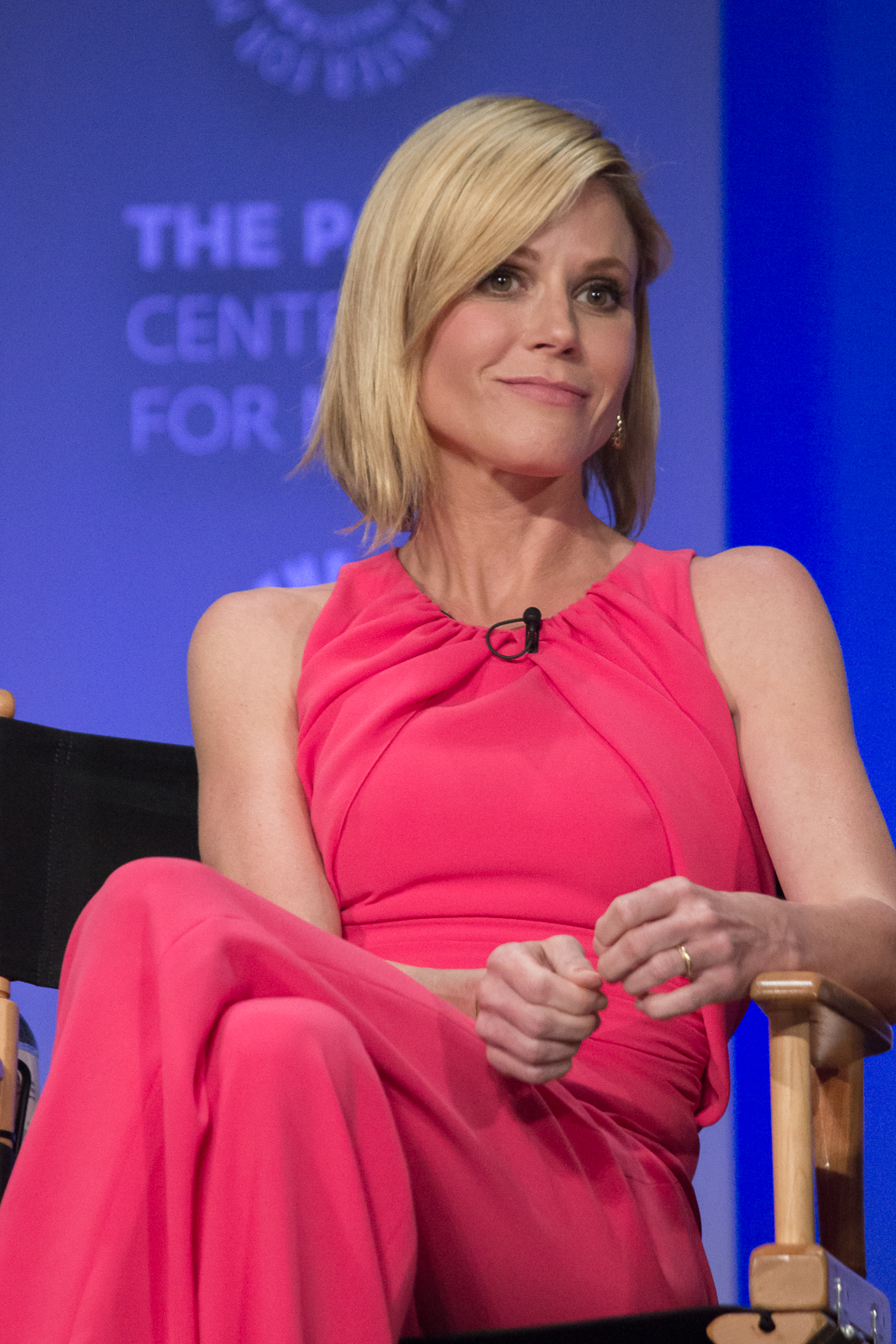
Julie Bowen

Aleksandar Vučić

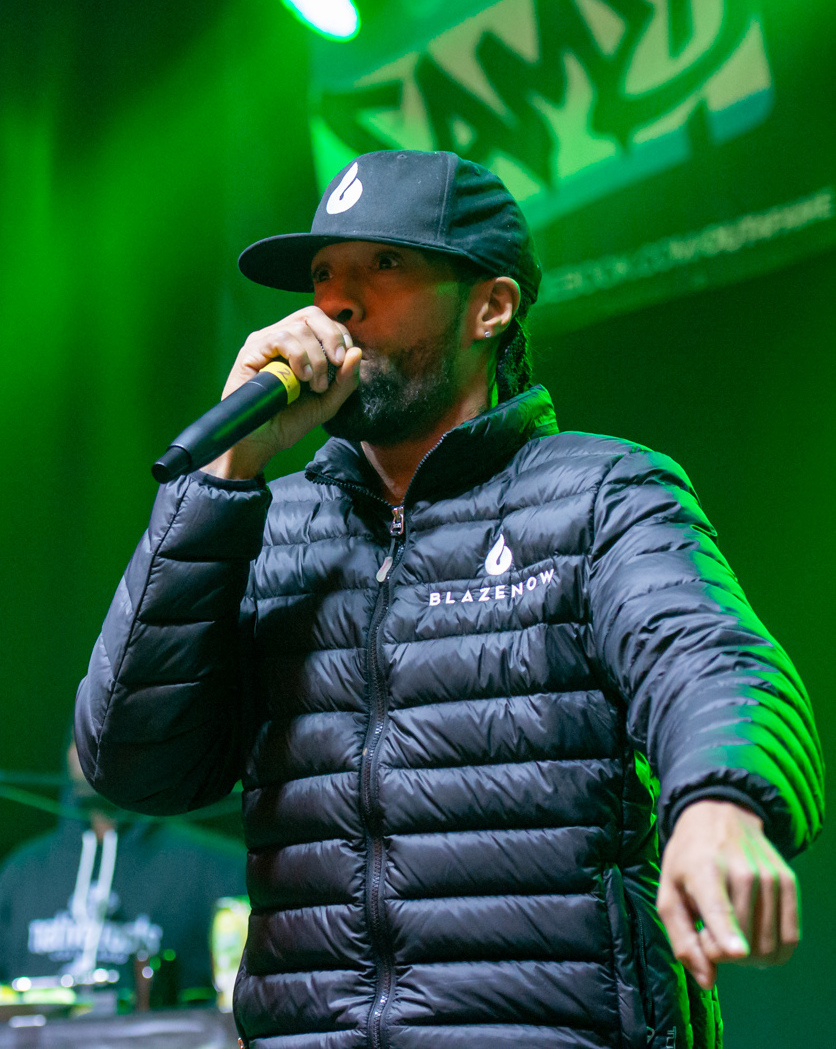
Redman

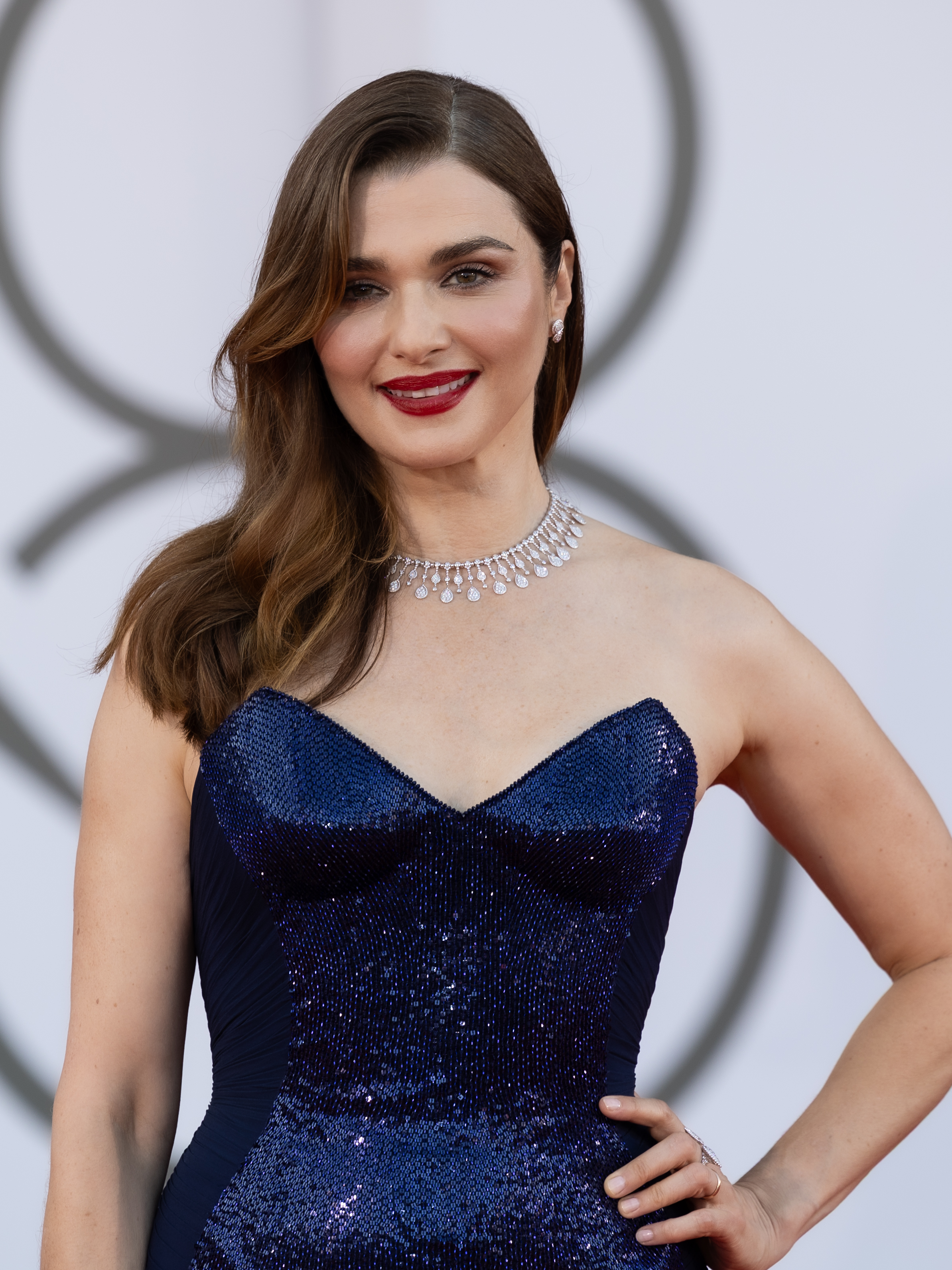
Rachel Weisz

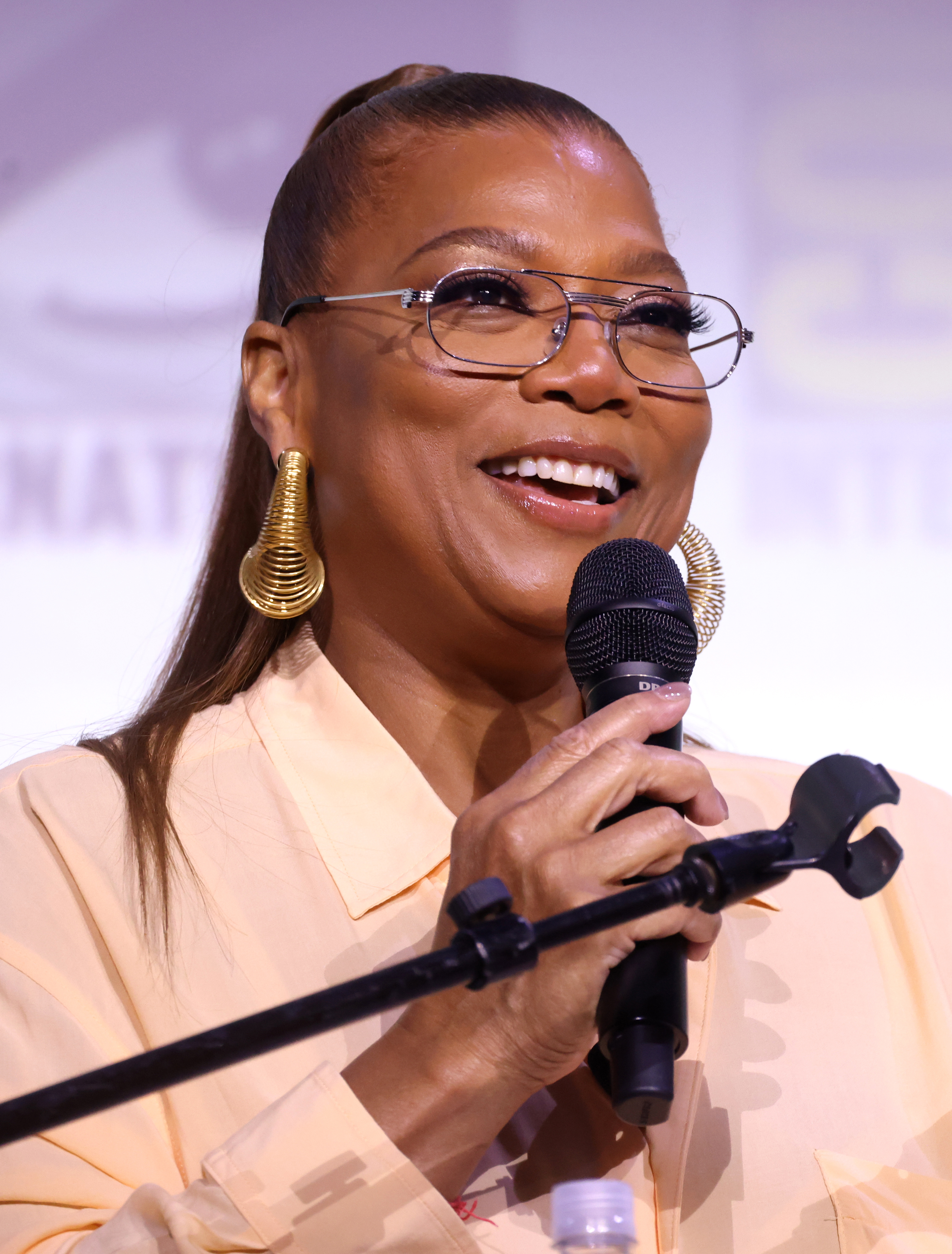
Queen Latifah

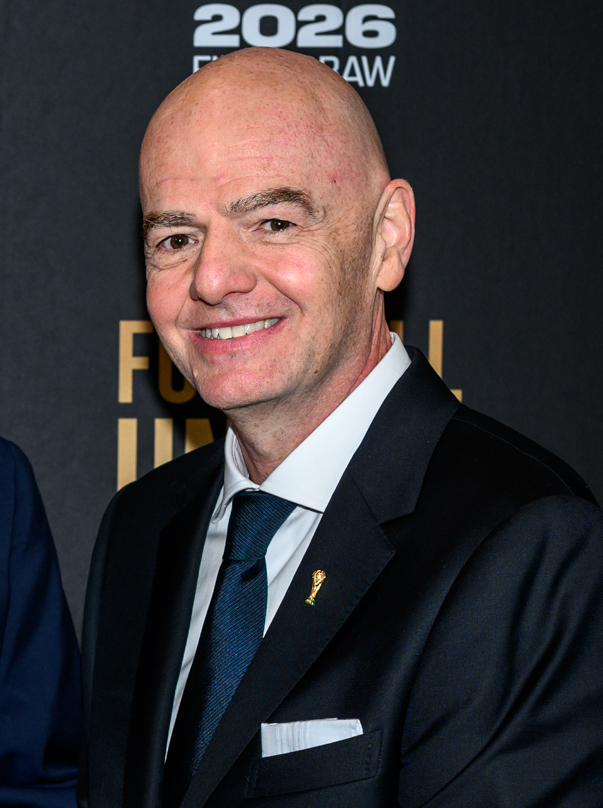
Gianni Infantino

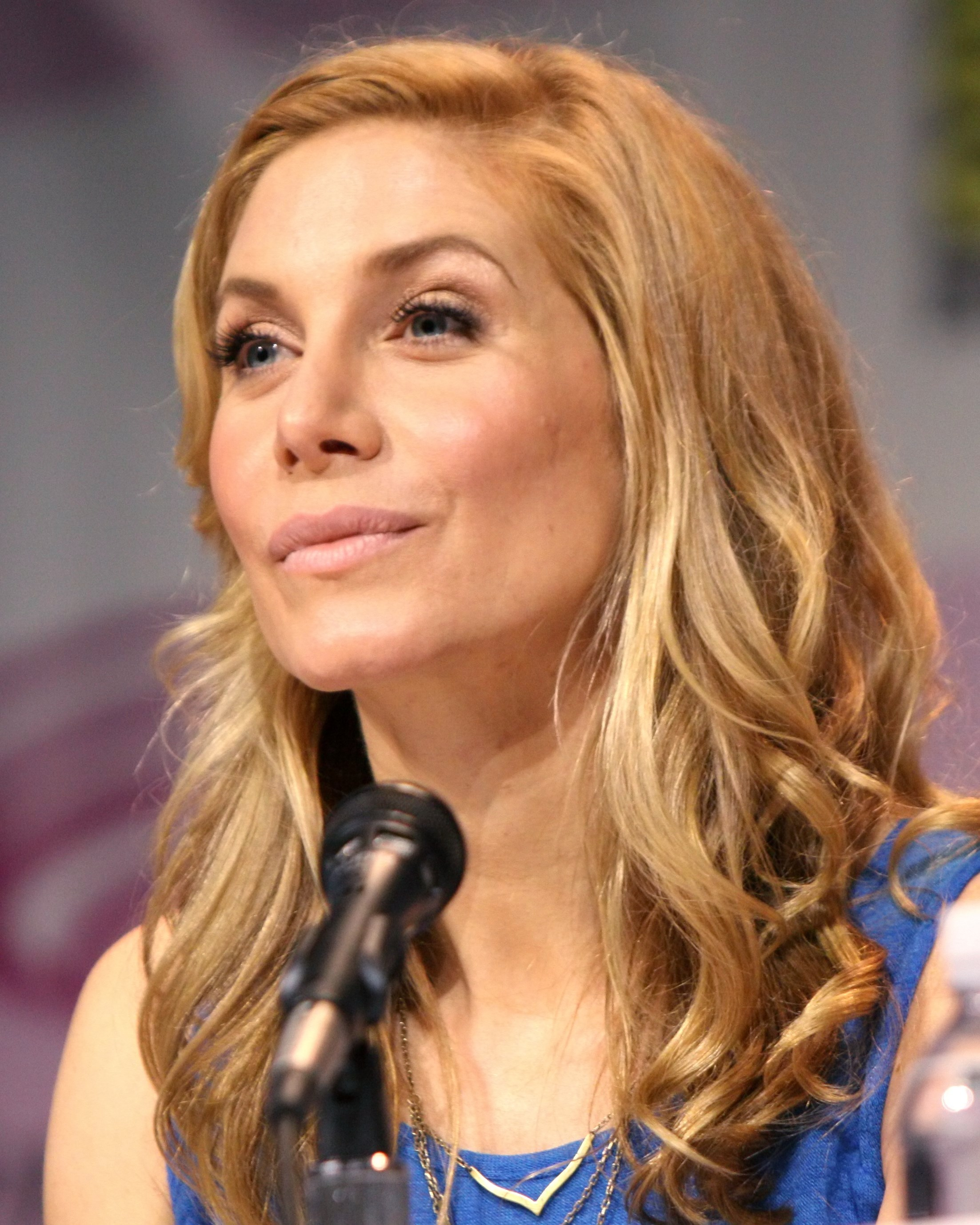
Elizabeth Mitchell

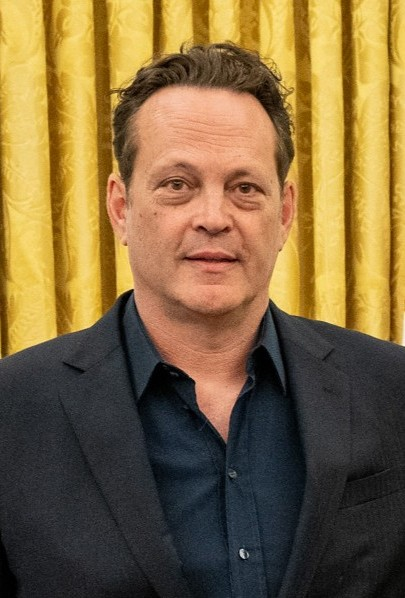
Vince Vaughn

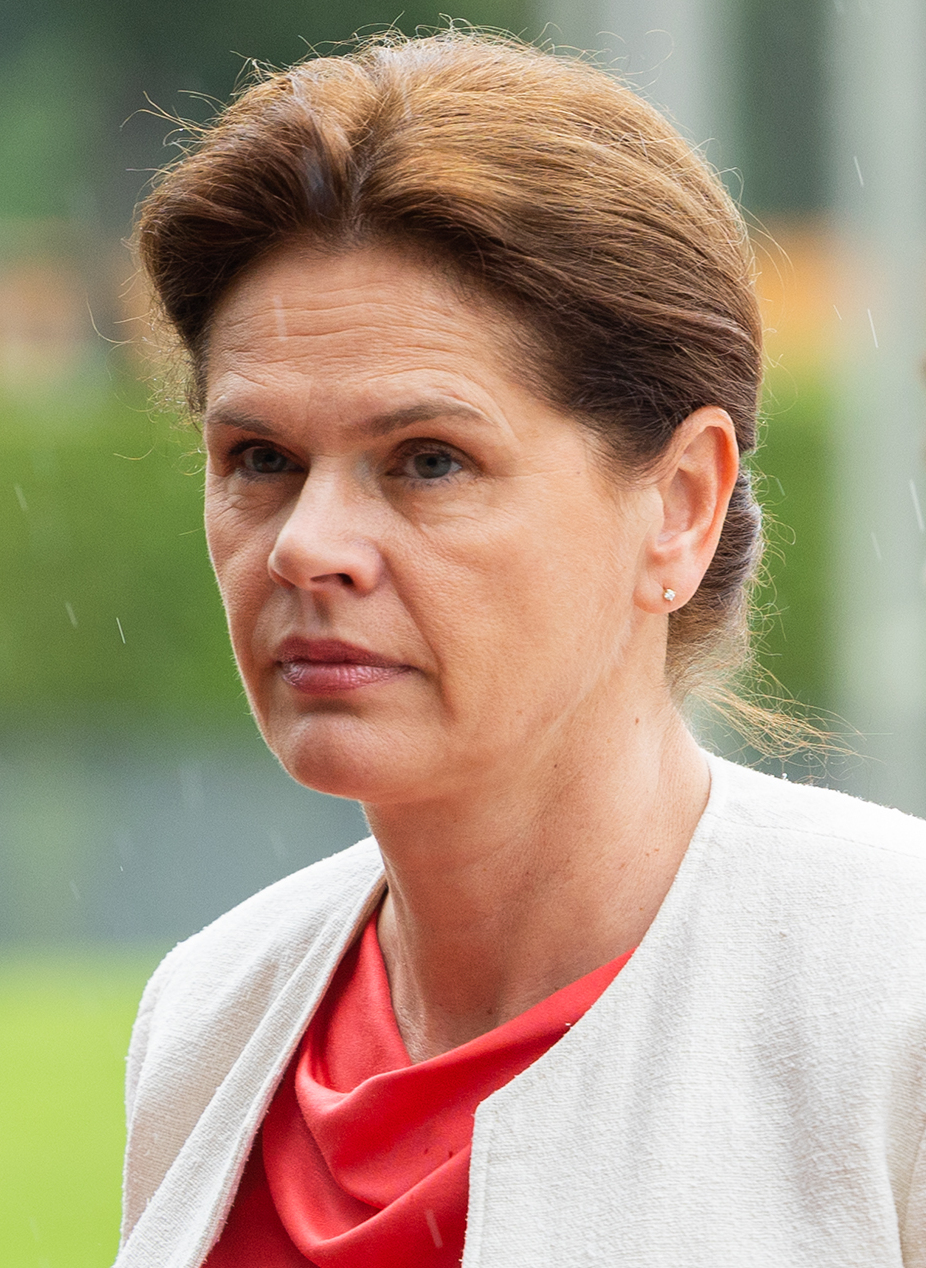
Alenka Bratušek

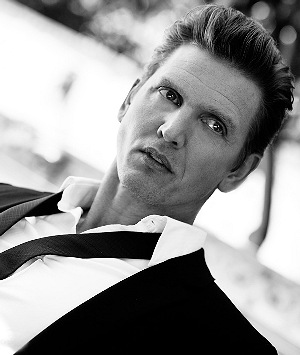
Barry Pepper

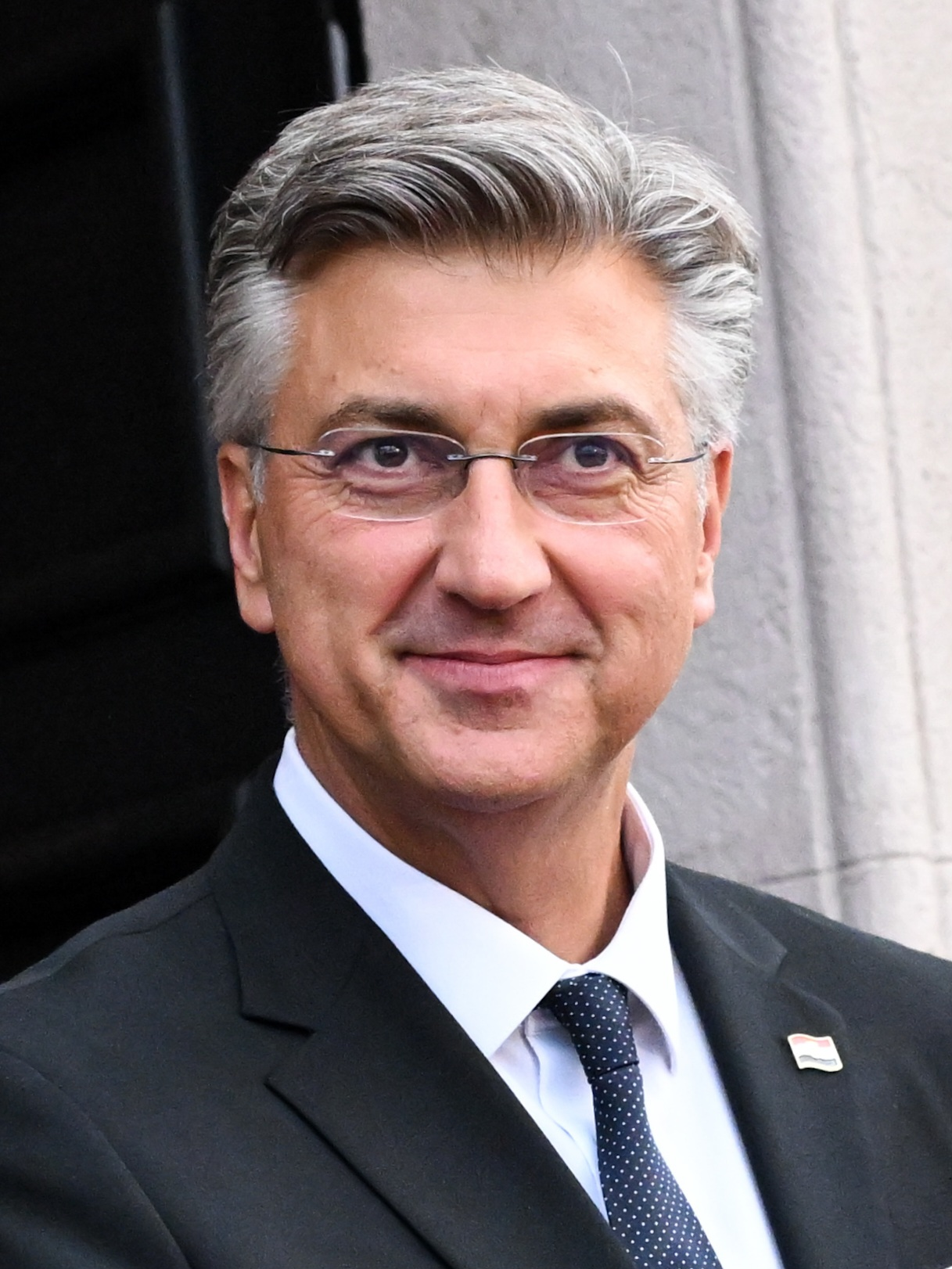
Andrej Plenković

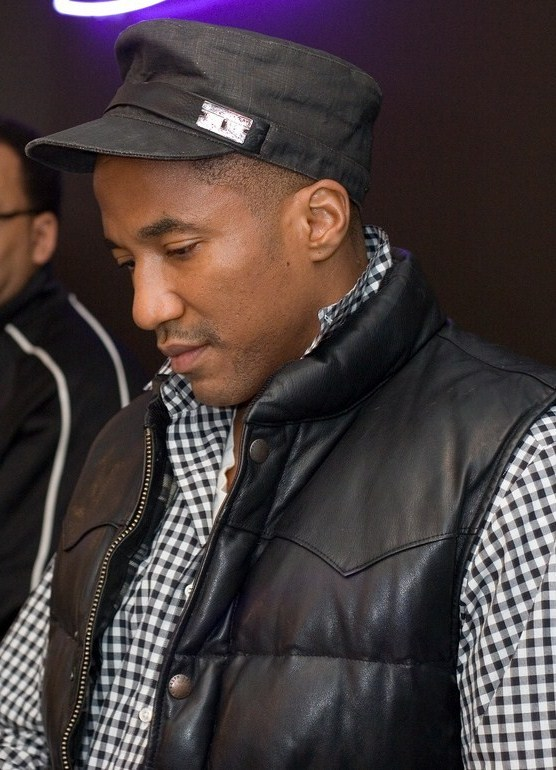
Q-Tip

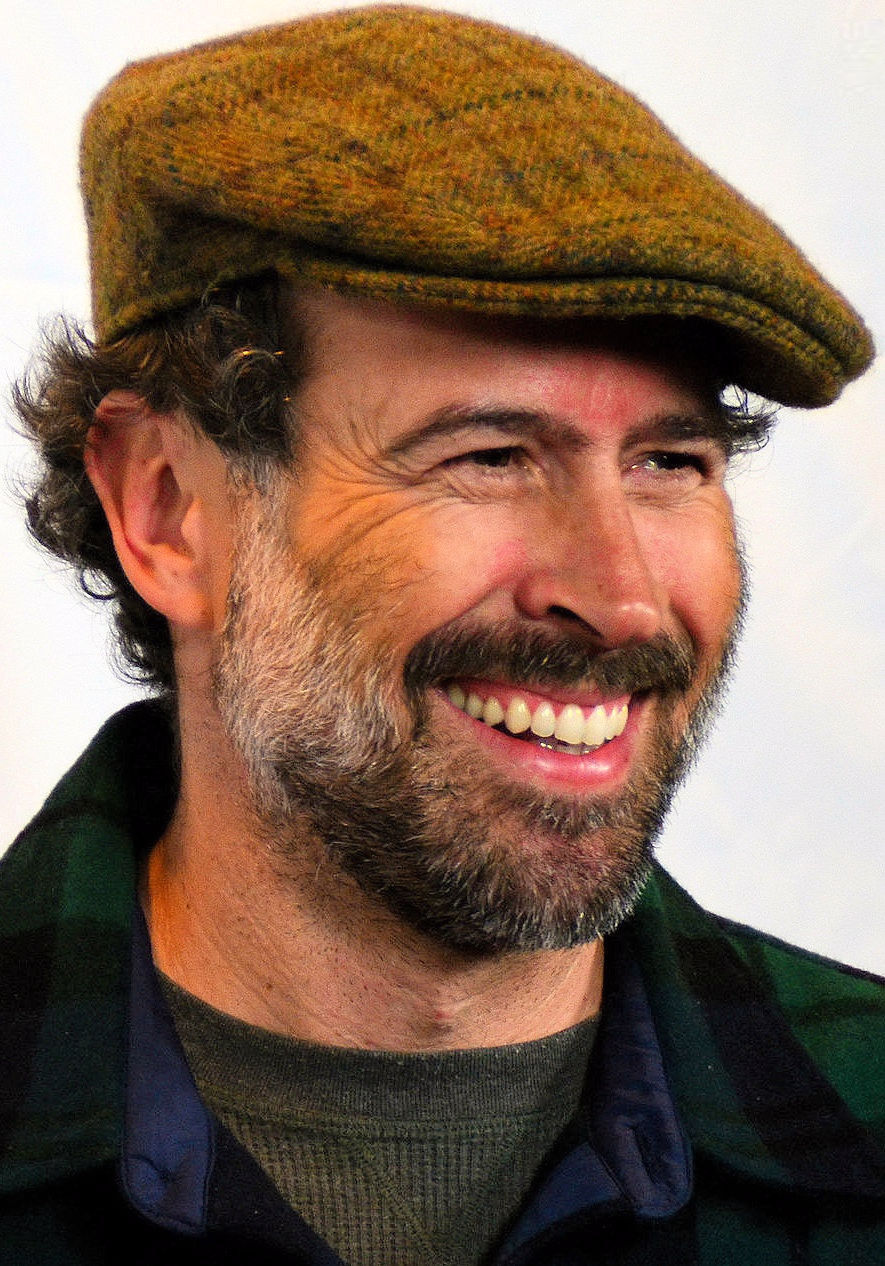
Jason Lee

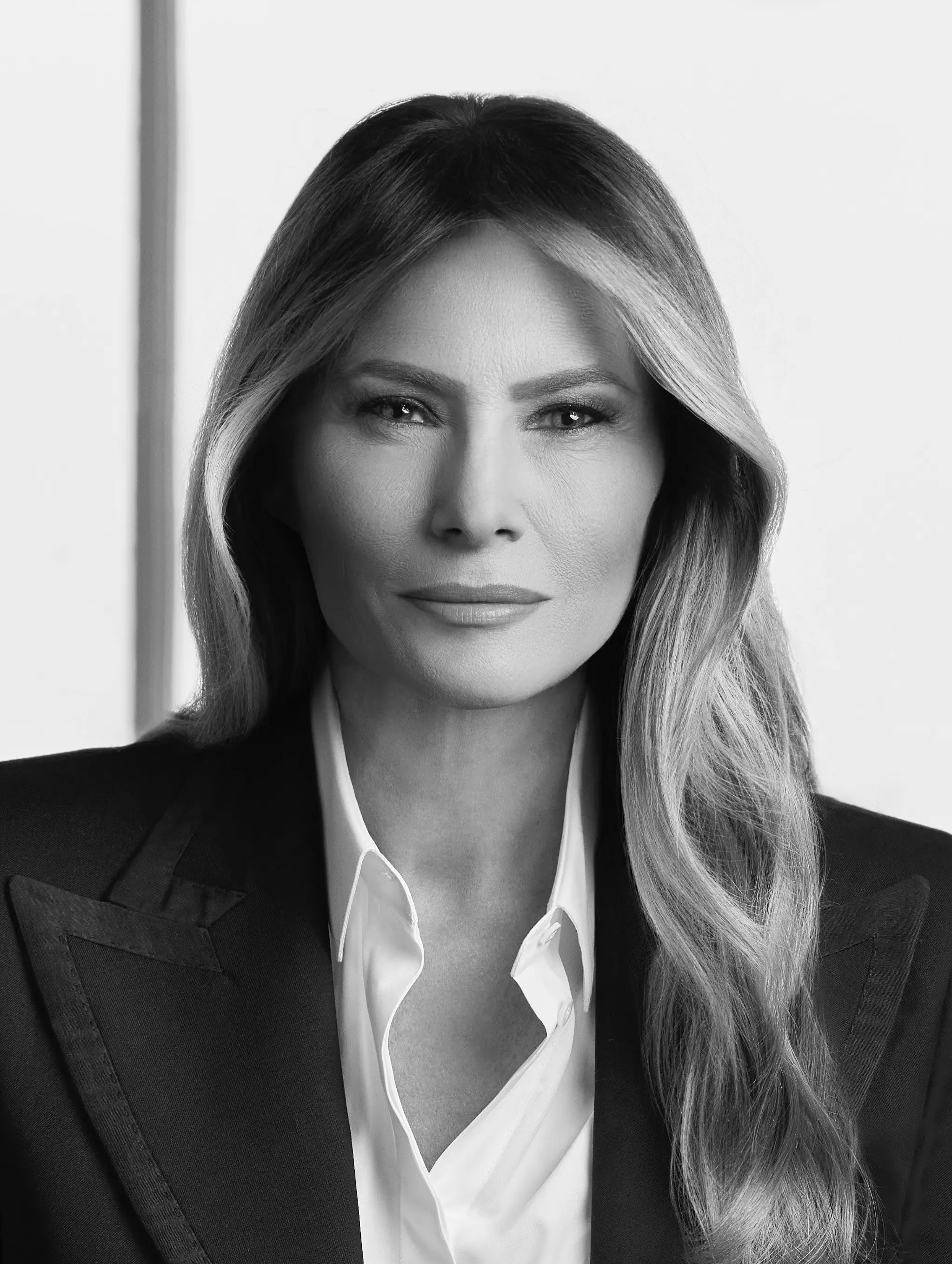
Melania Trump

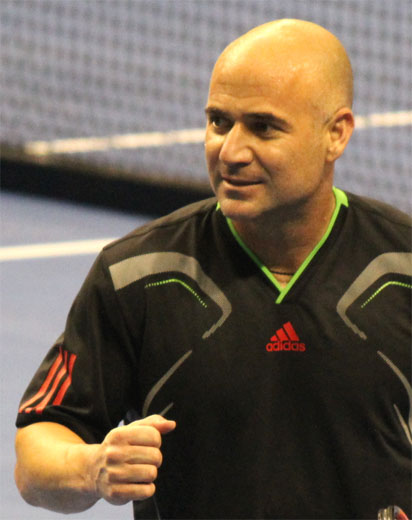
Andre Agassi

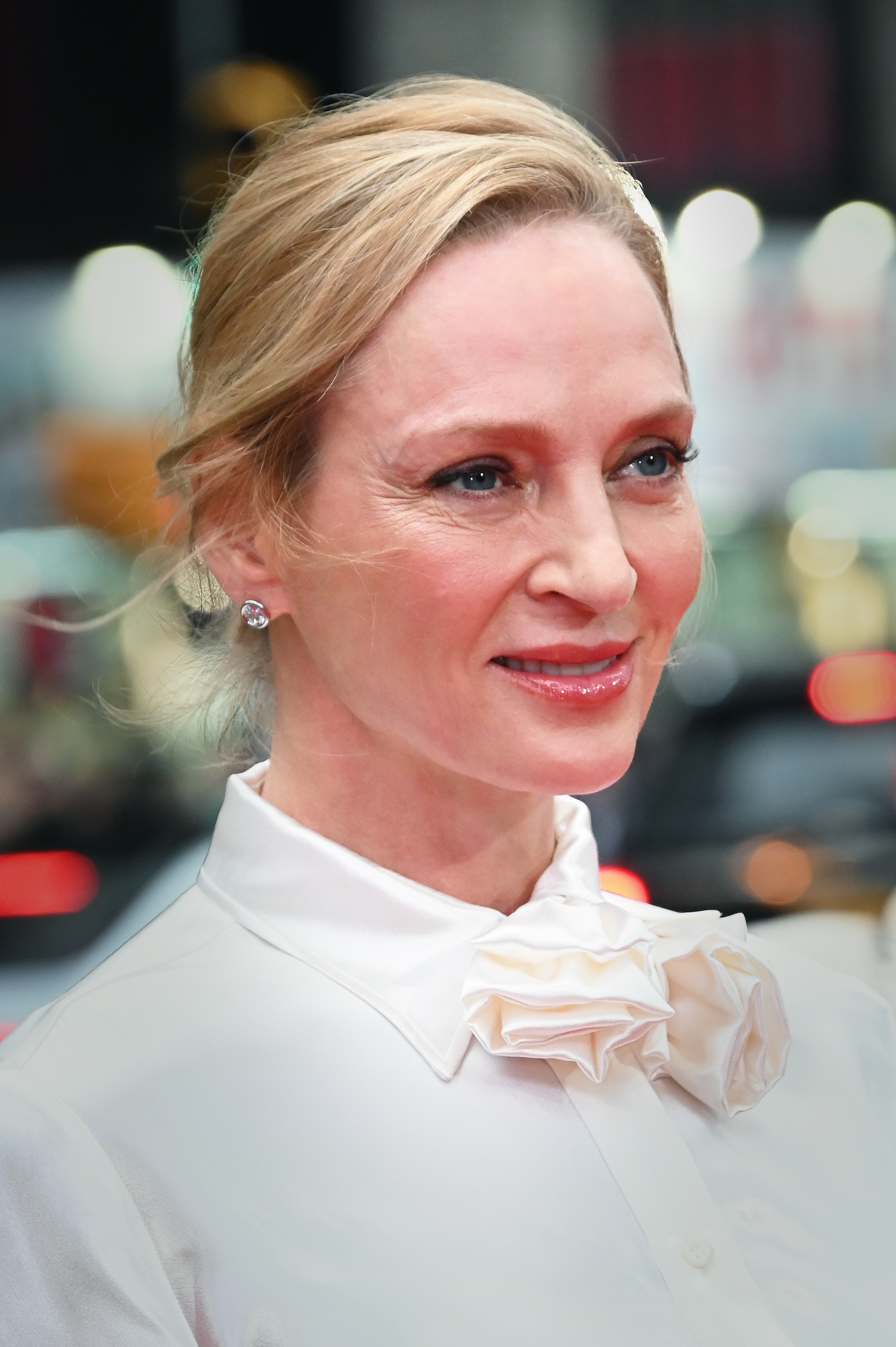
Uma Thurman

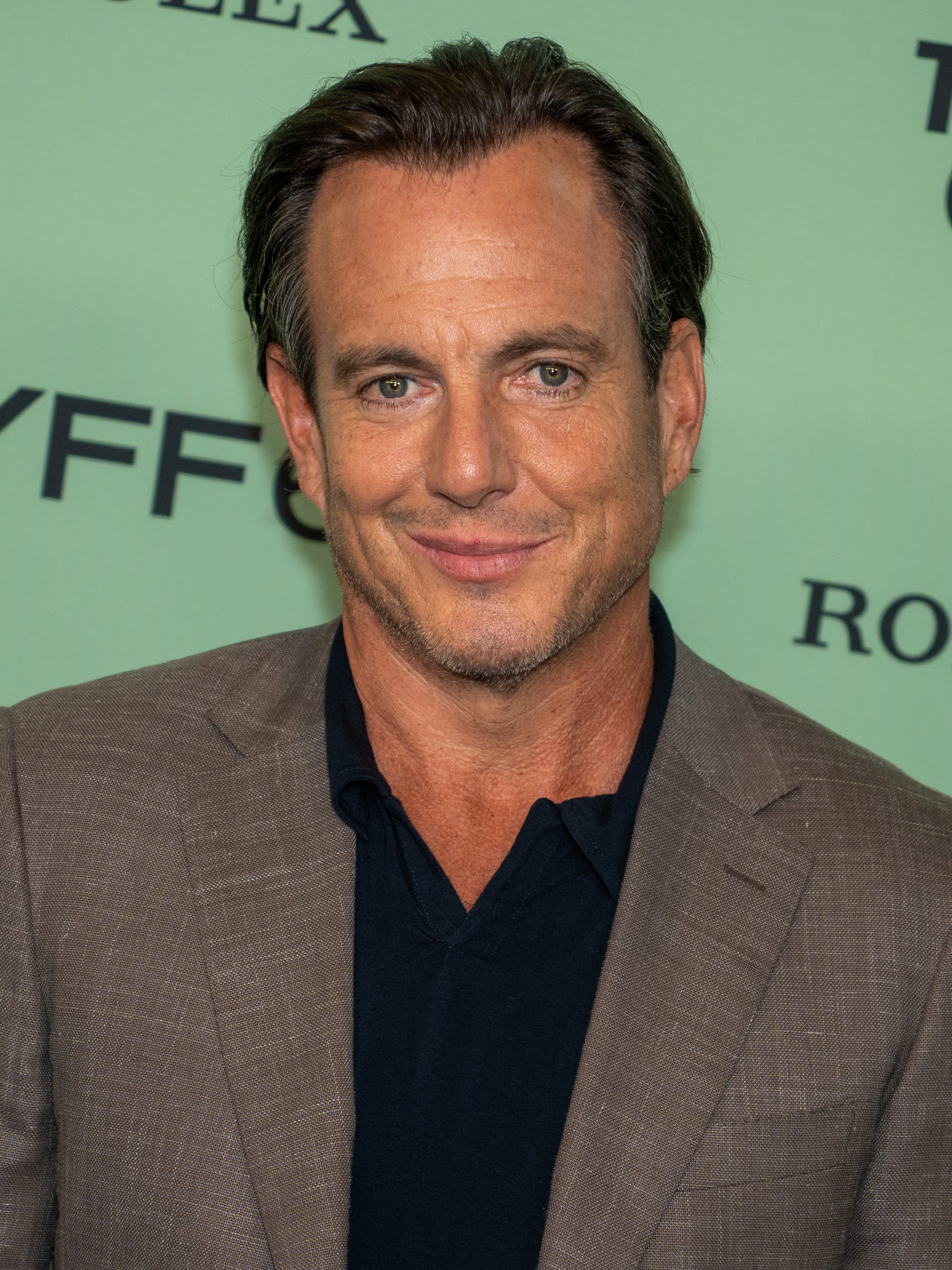
Will Arnett

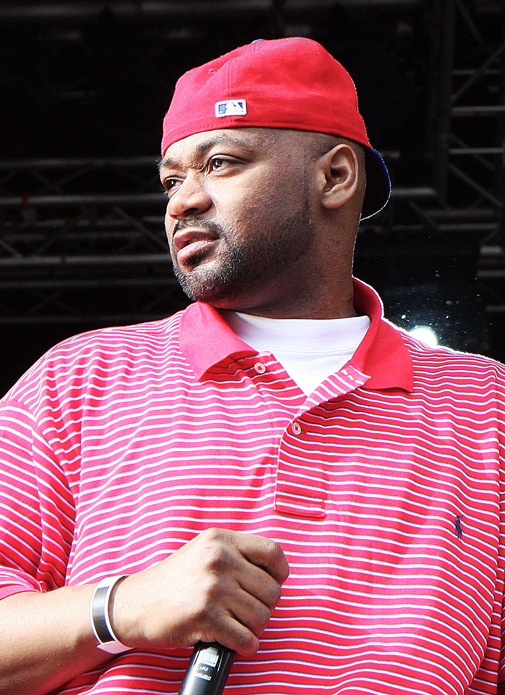
Ghostface Killah

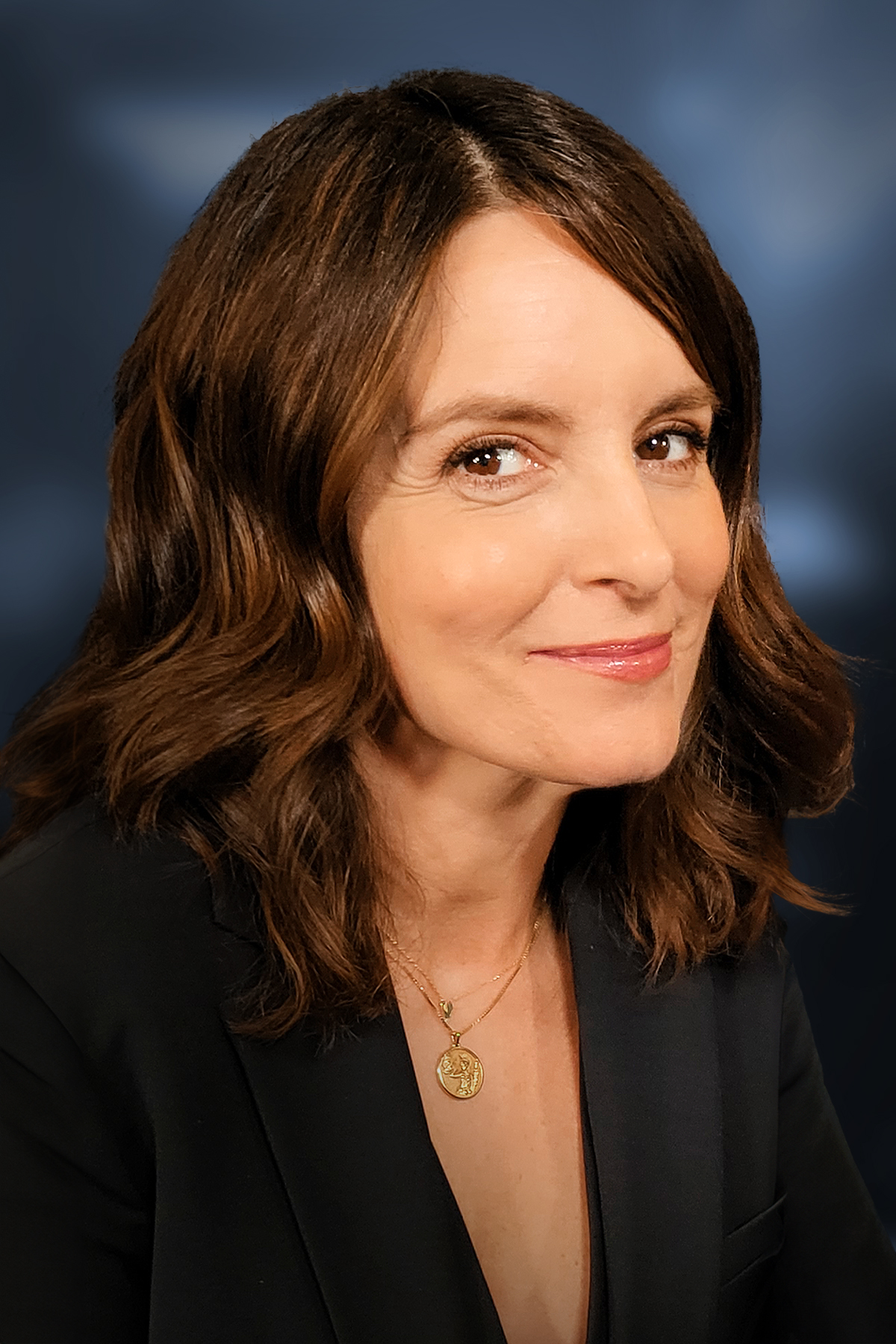
Tina Fey

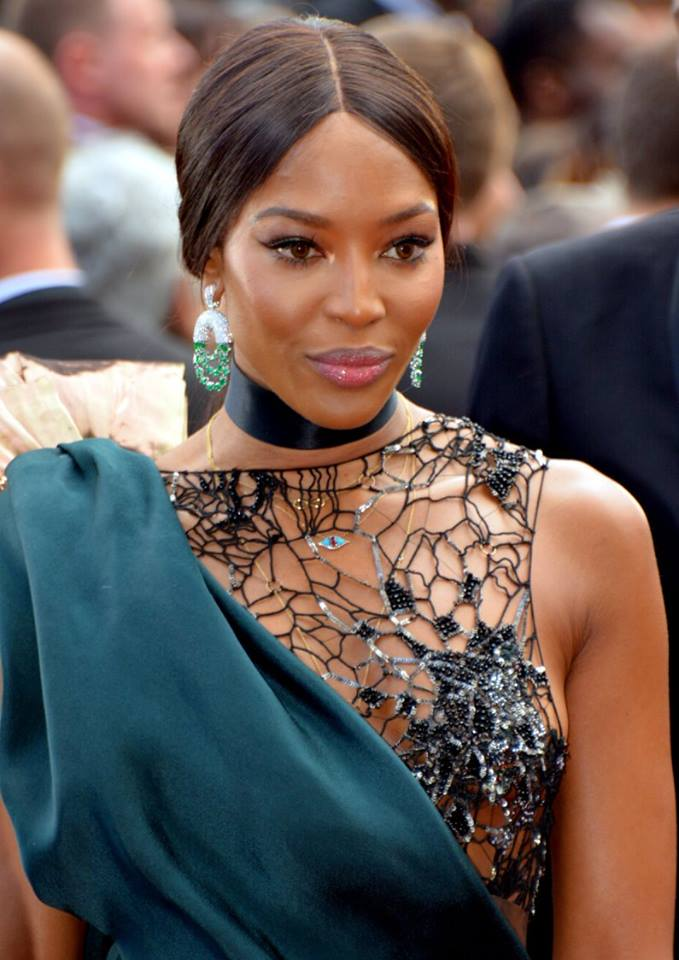
Naomi Campbell

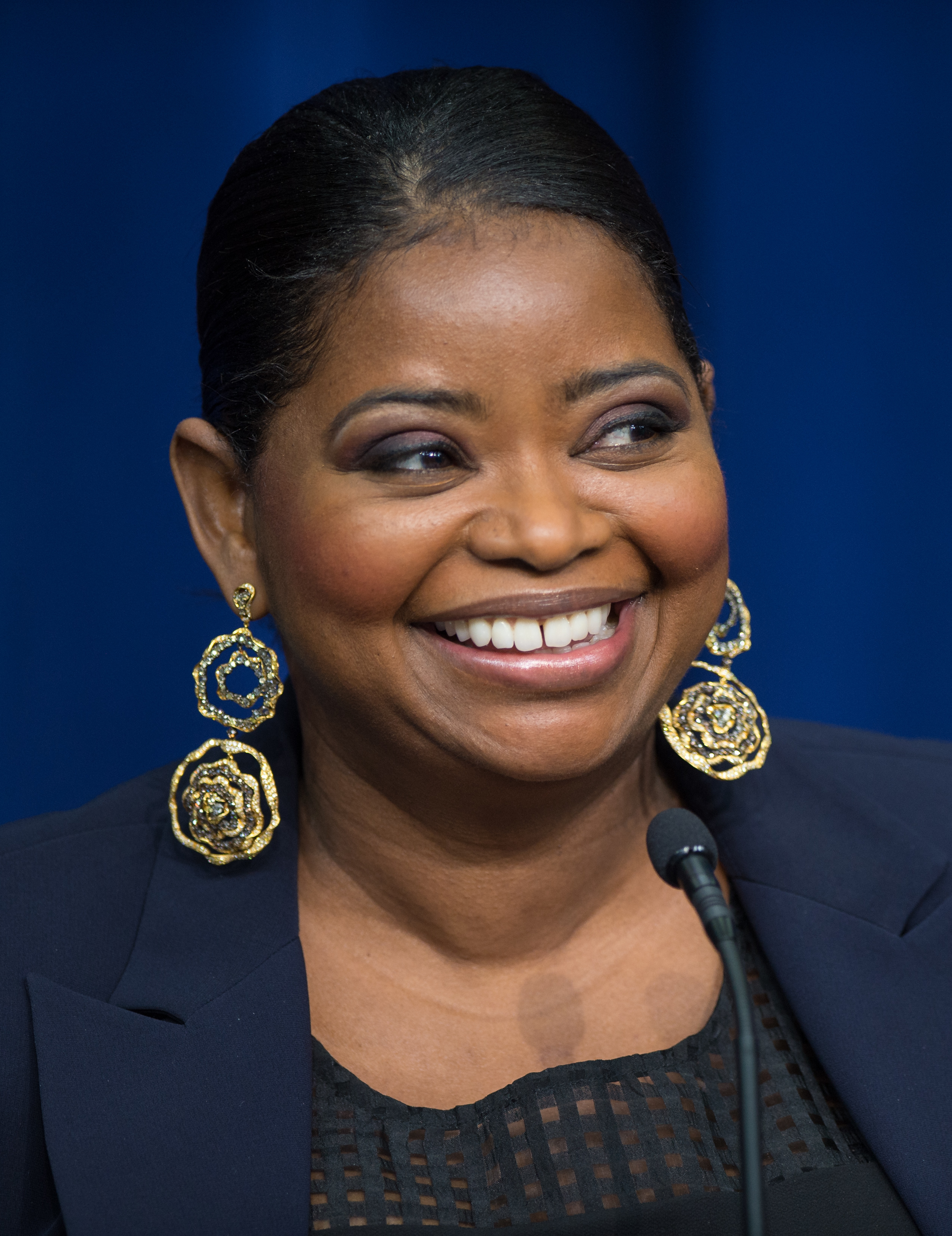
Octavia Spencer

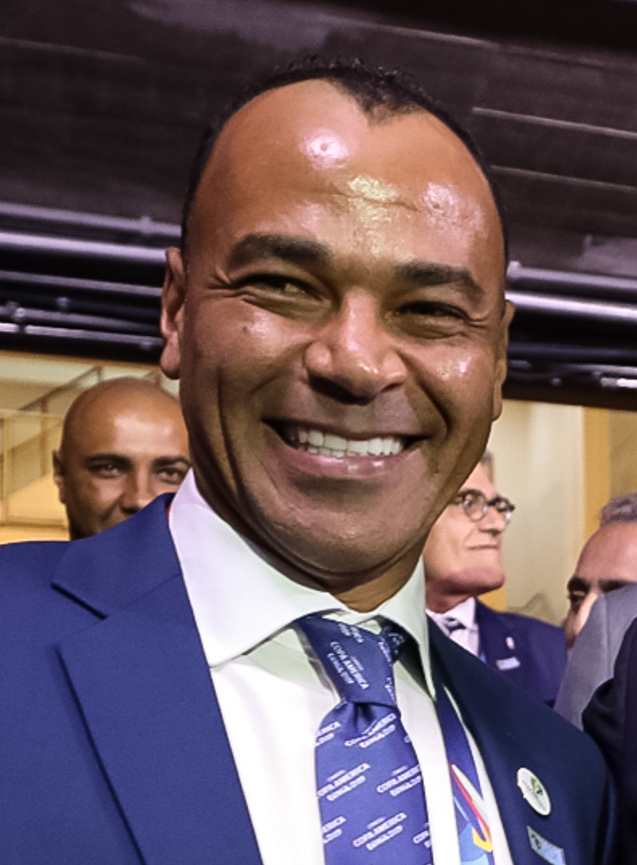
Cafu

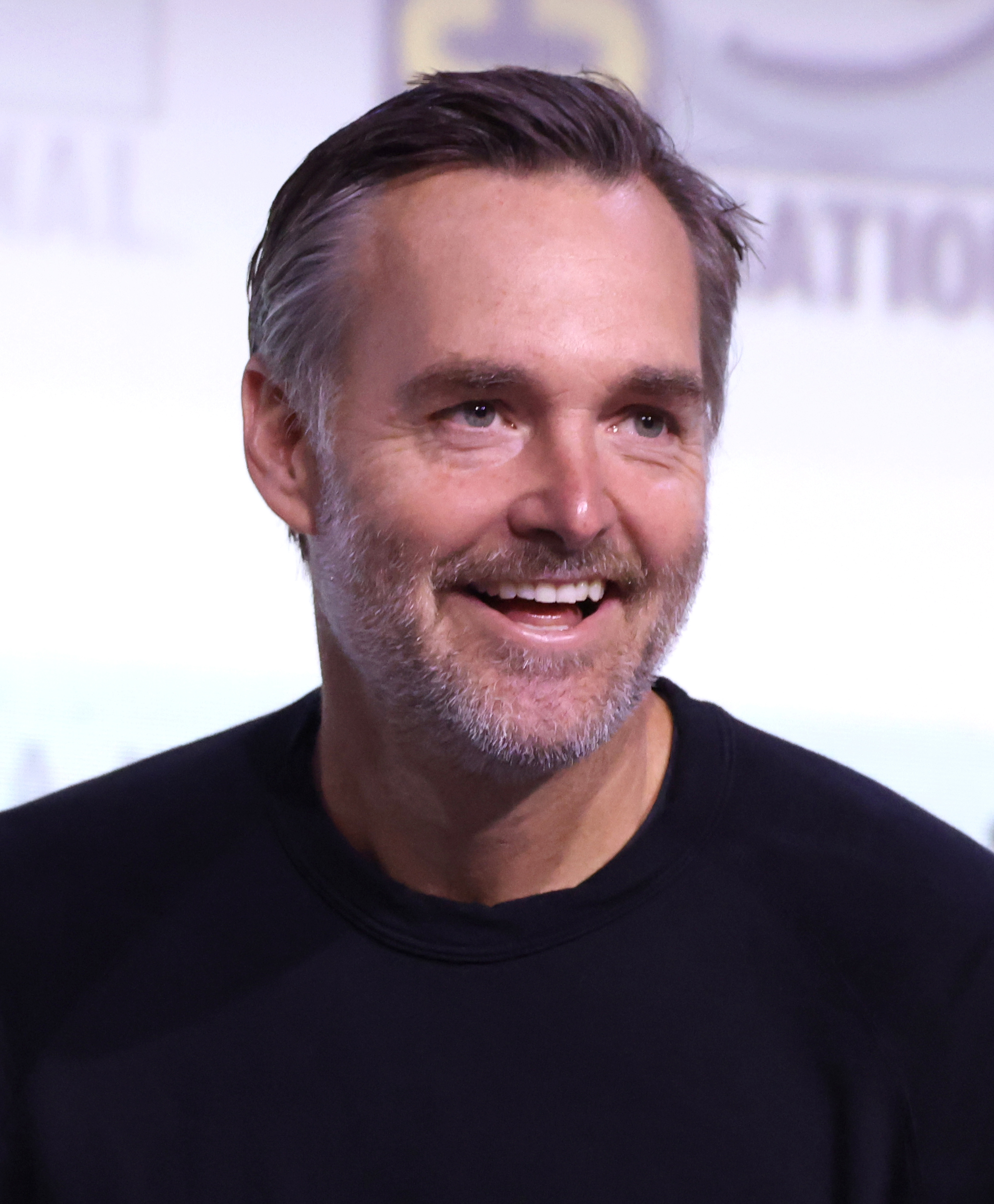
Will Forte

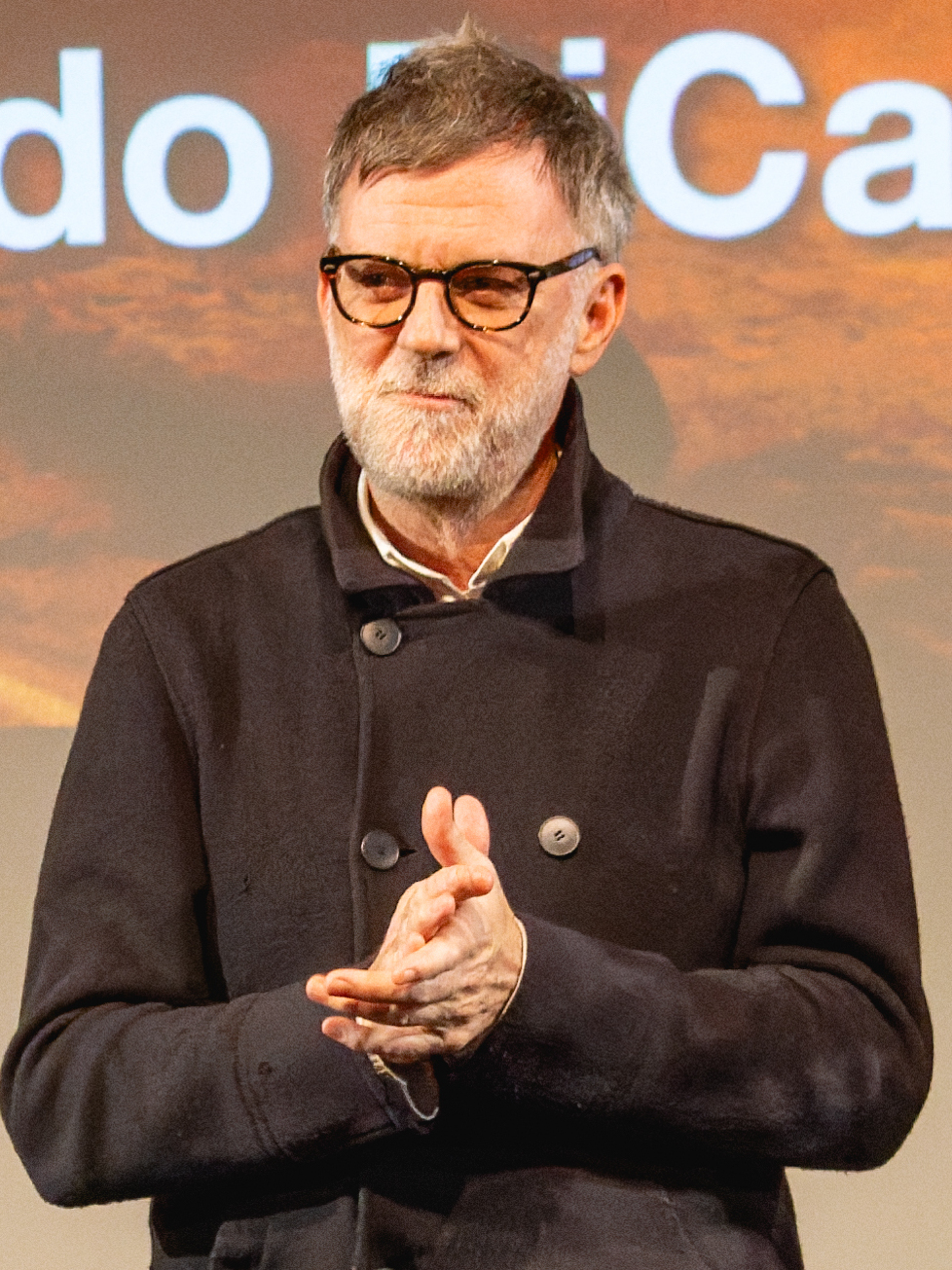
Paul Thomas Anderson

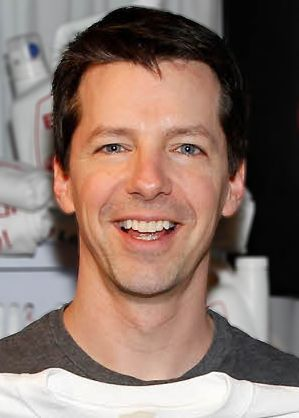
Sean Hayes

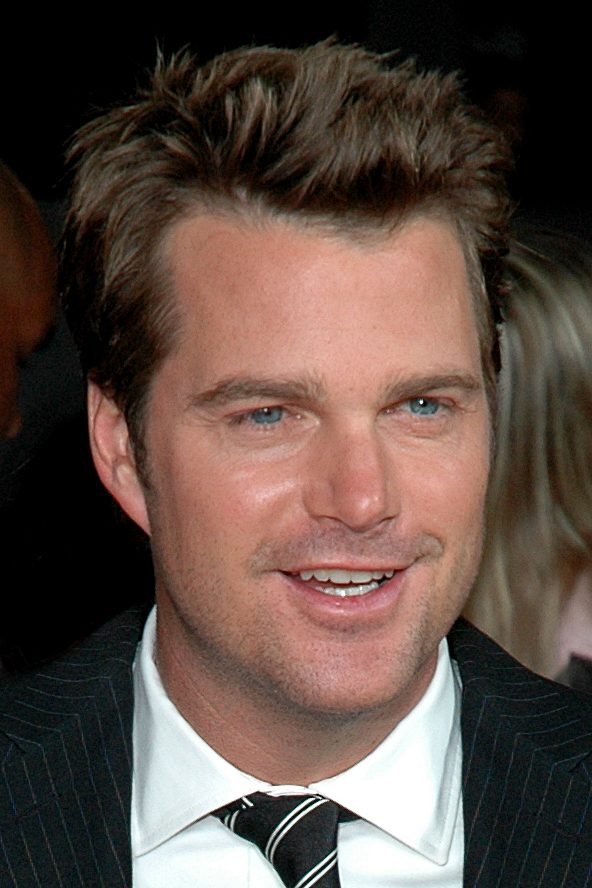
Chris O'Donnell

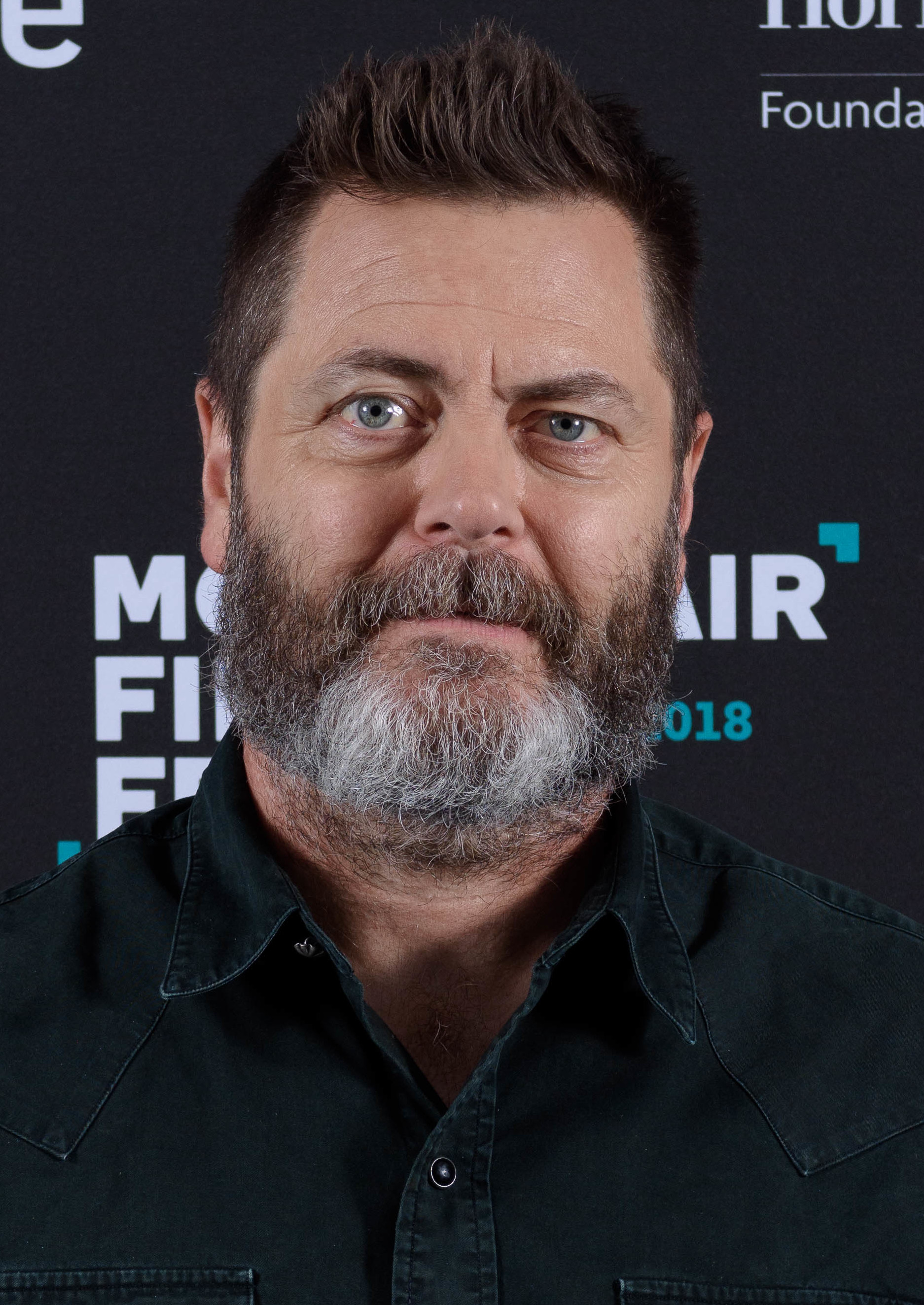
Nick Offerman

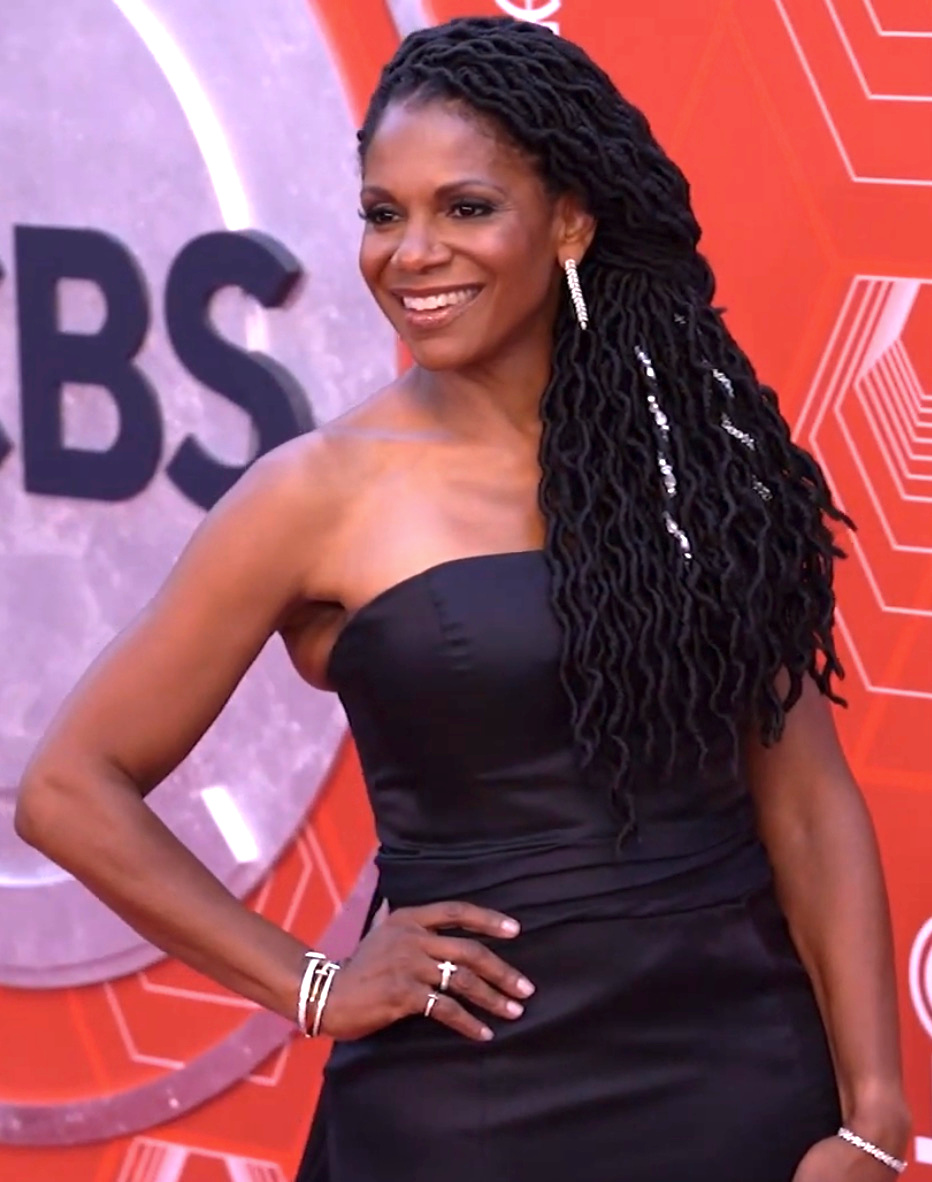
Audra McDonald

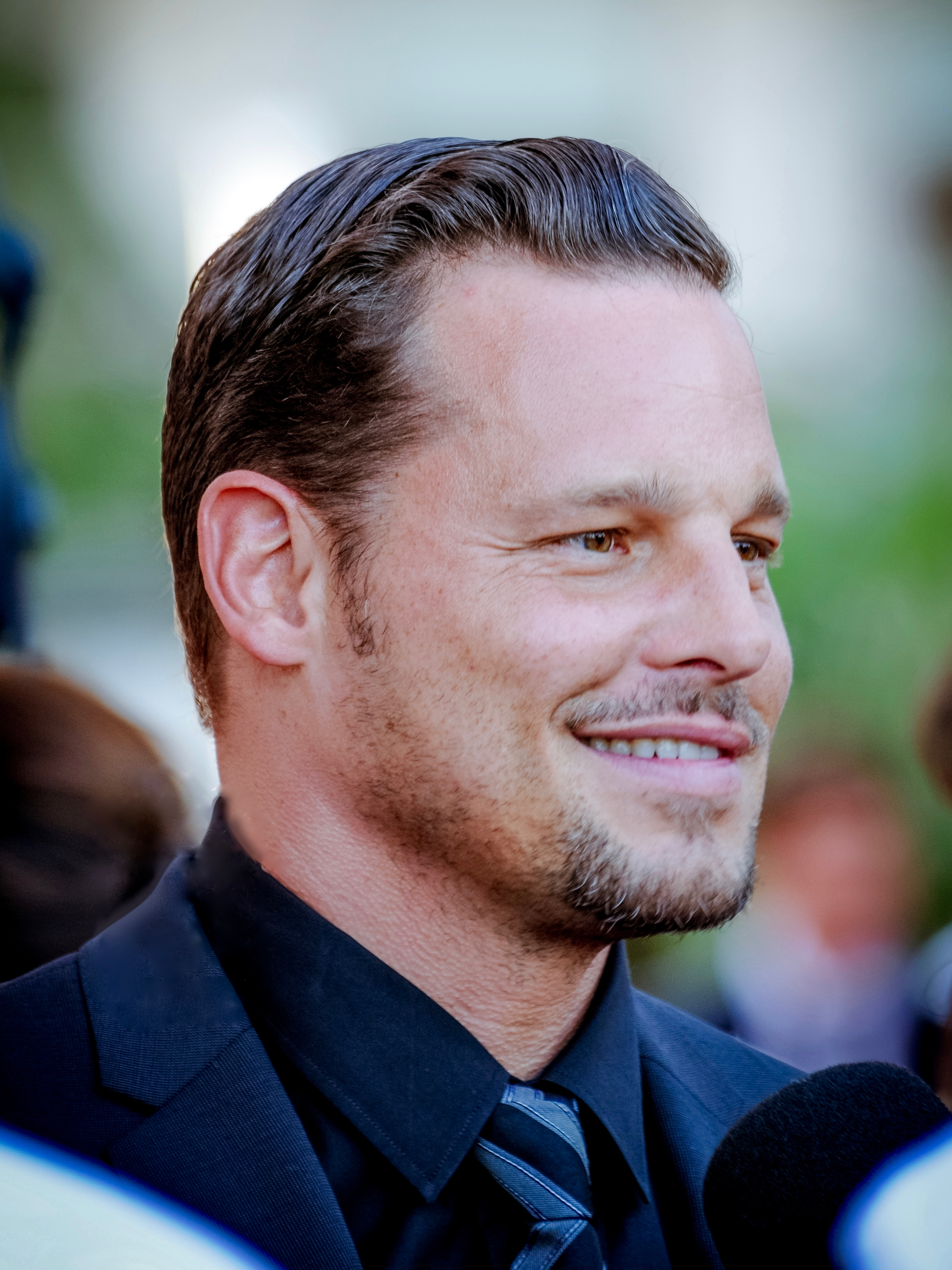
Justin Chambers

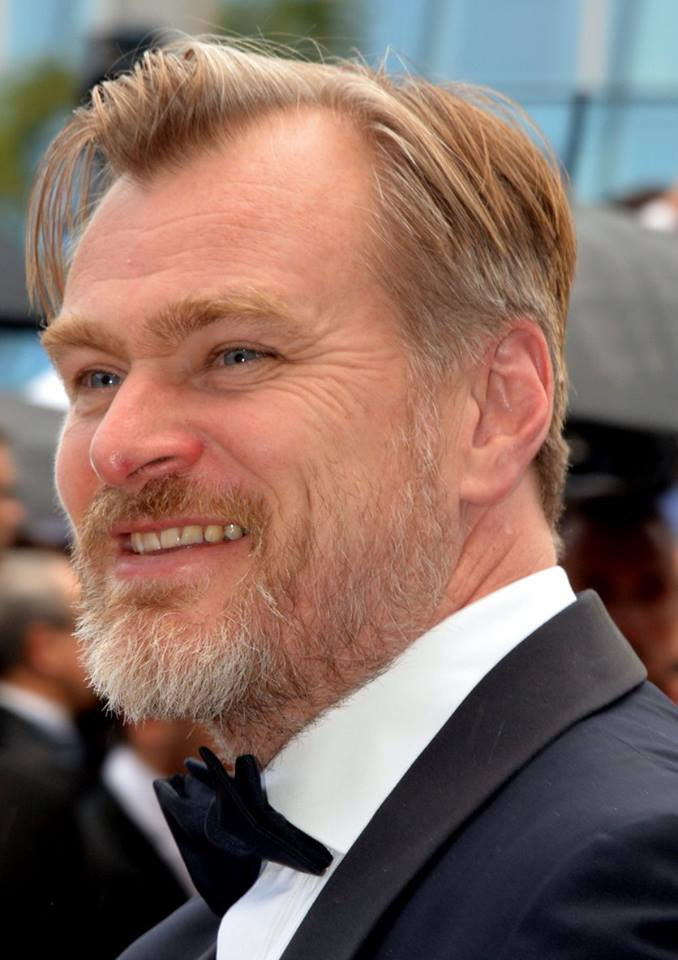
Christopher Nolan

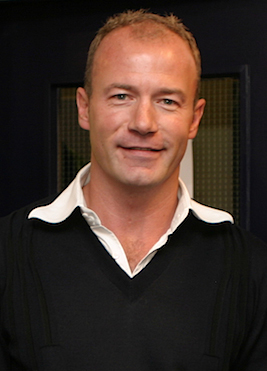
Alan Shearer

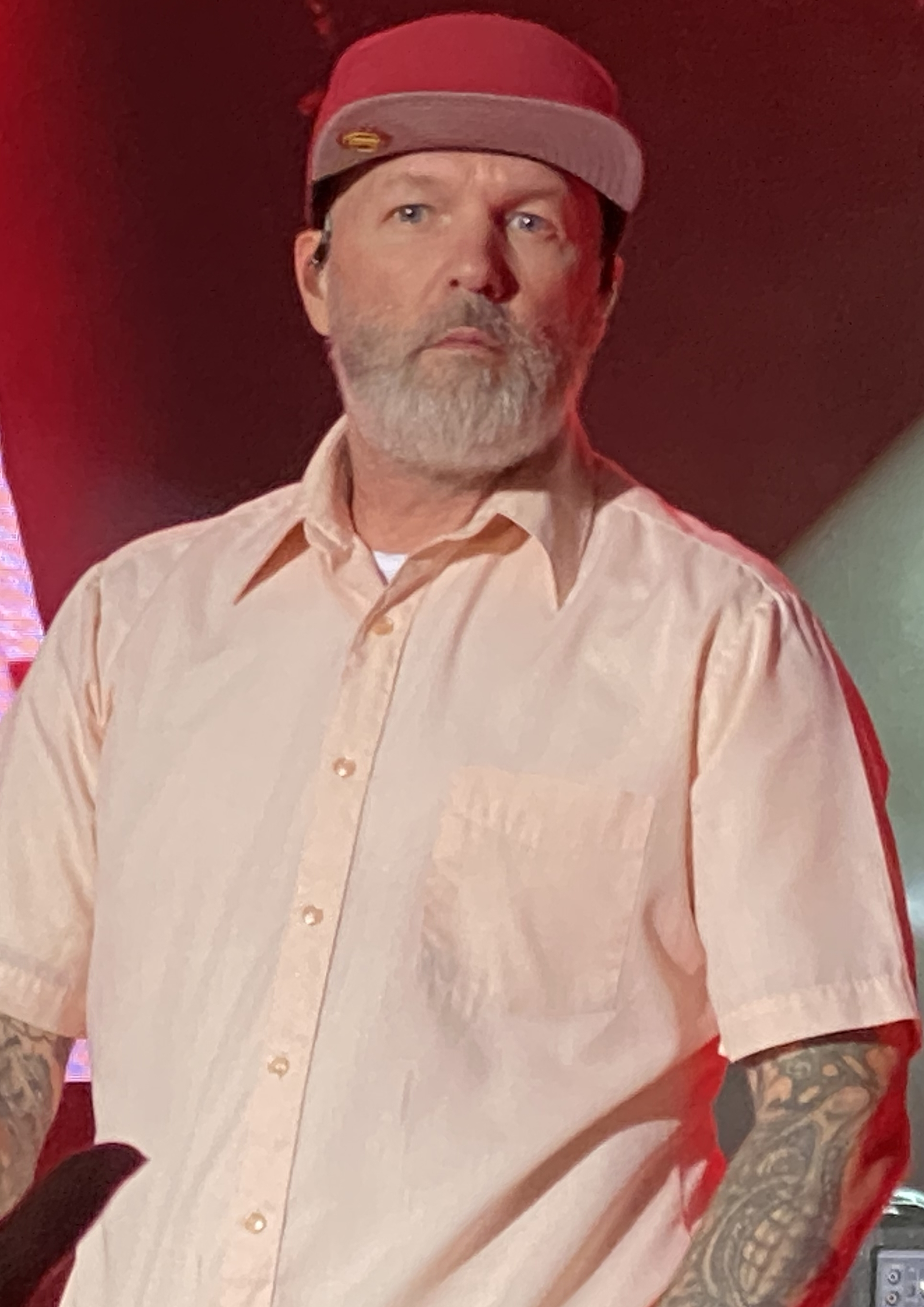
Fred Durst

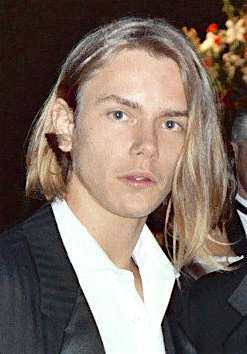
River Phoenix

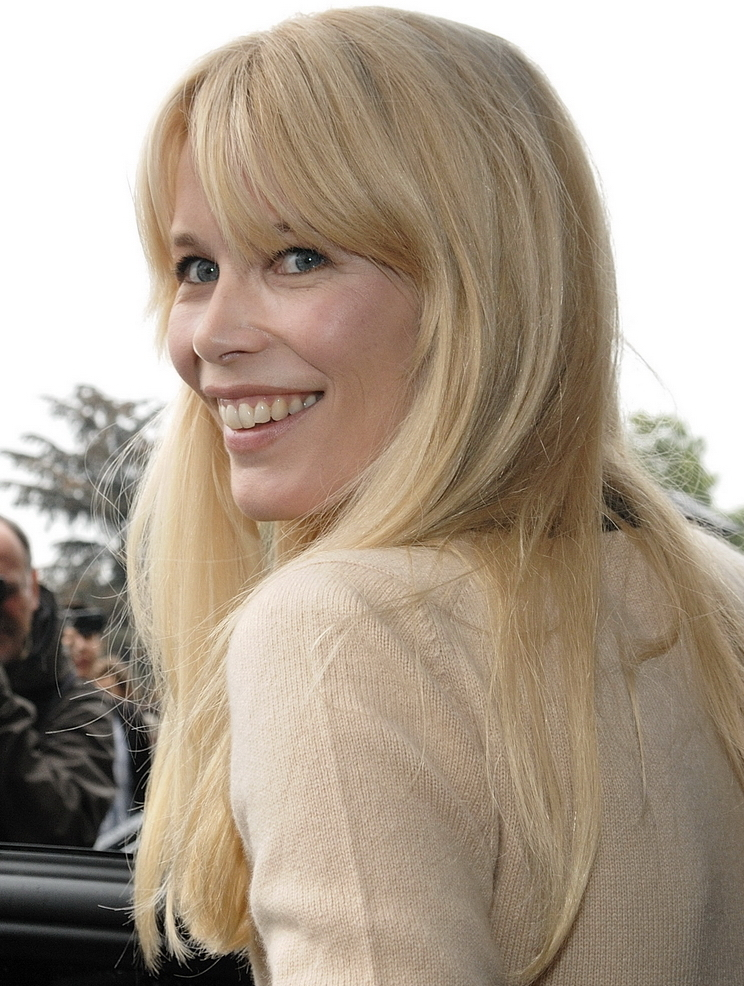
Claudia Schiffer

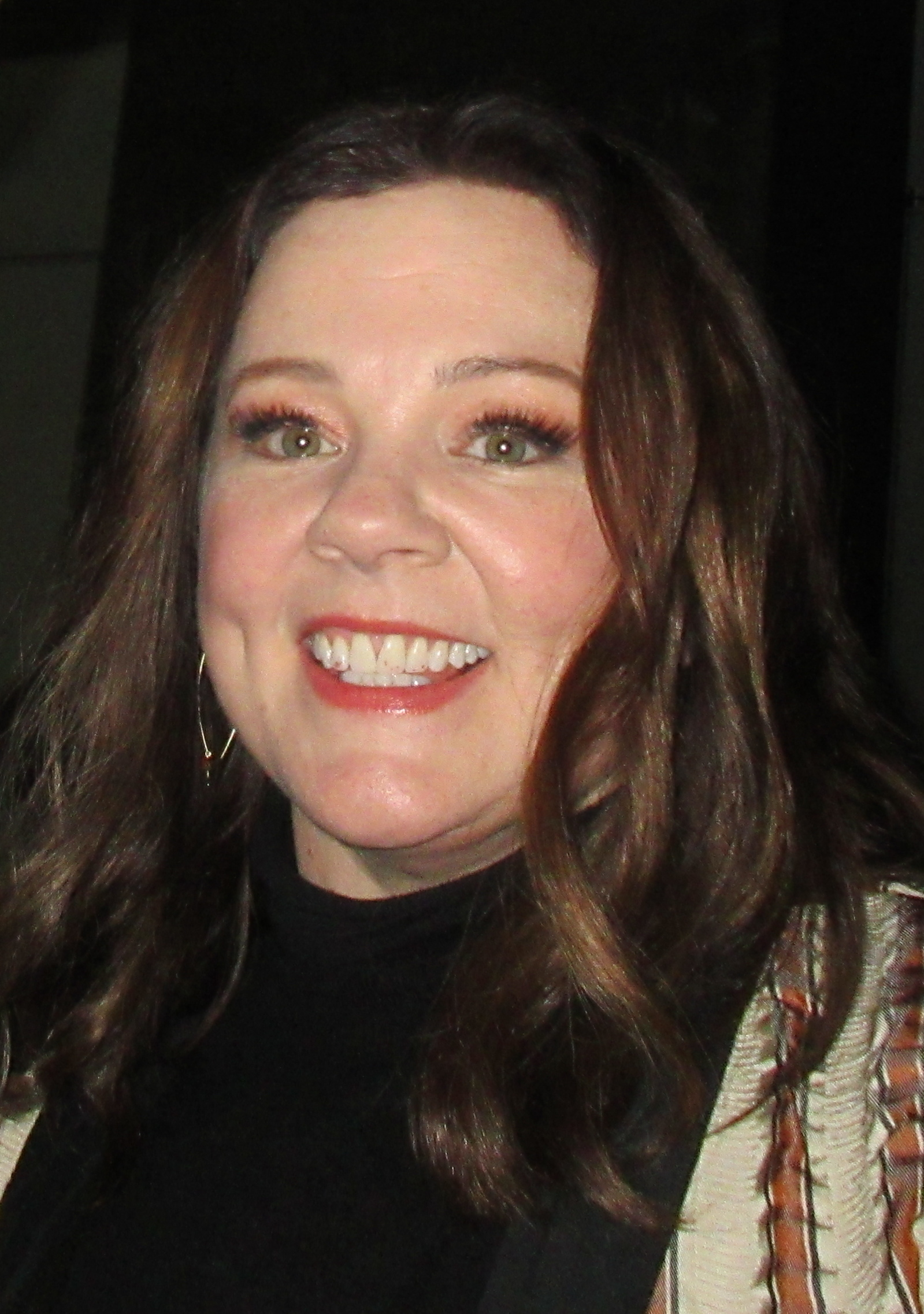
Melissa McCarthy

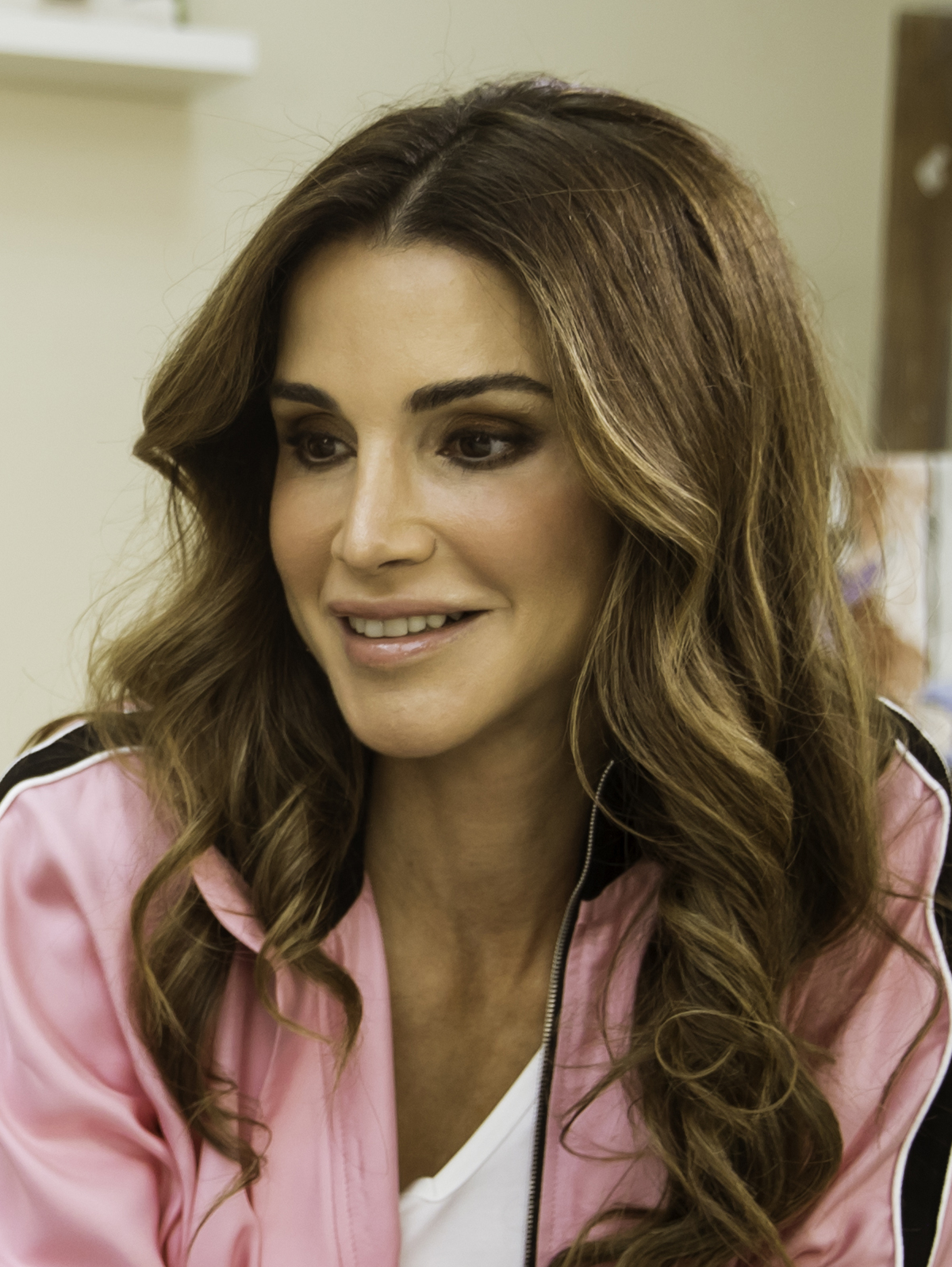
Queen Rania of Jordan

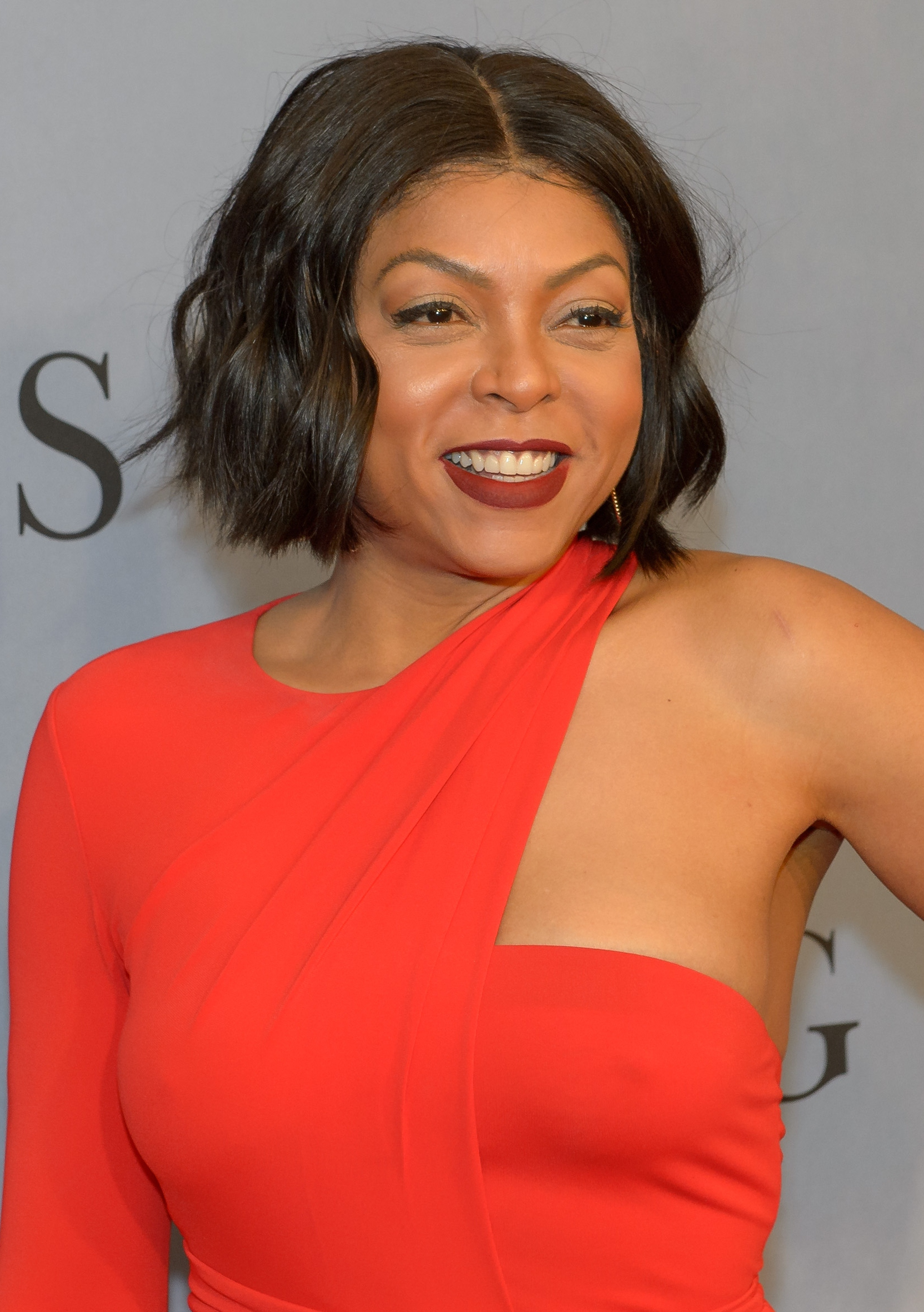
Taraji P. Henson

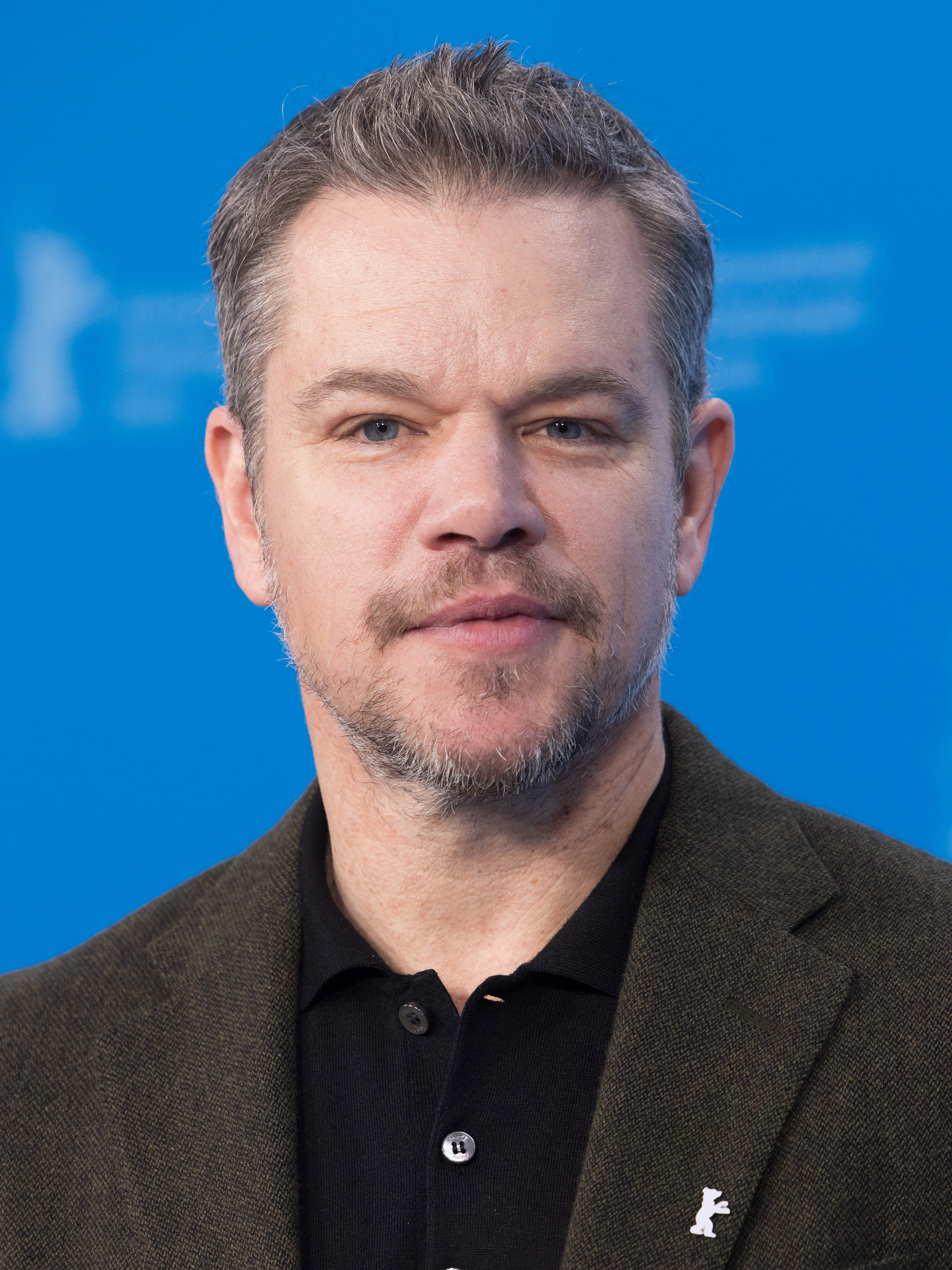
Matt Damon

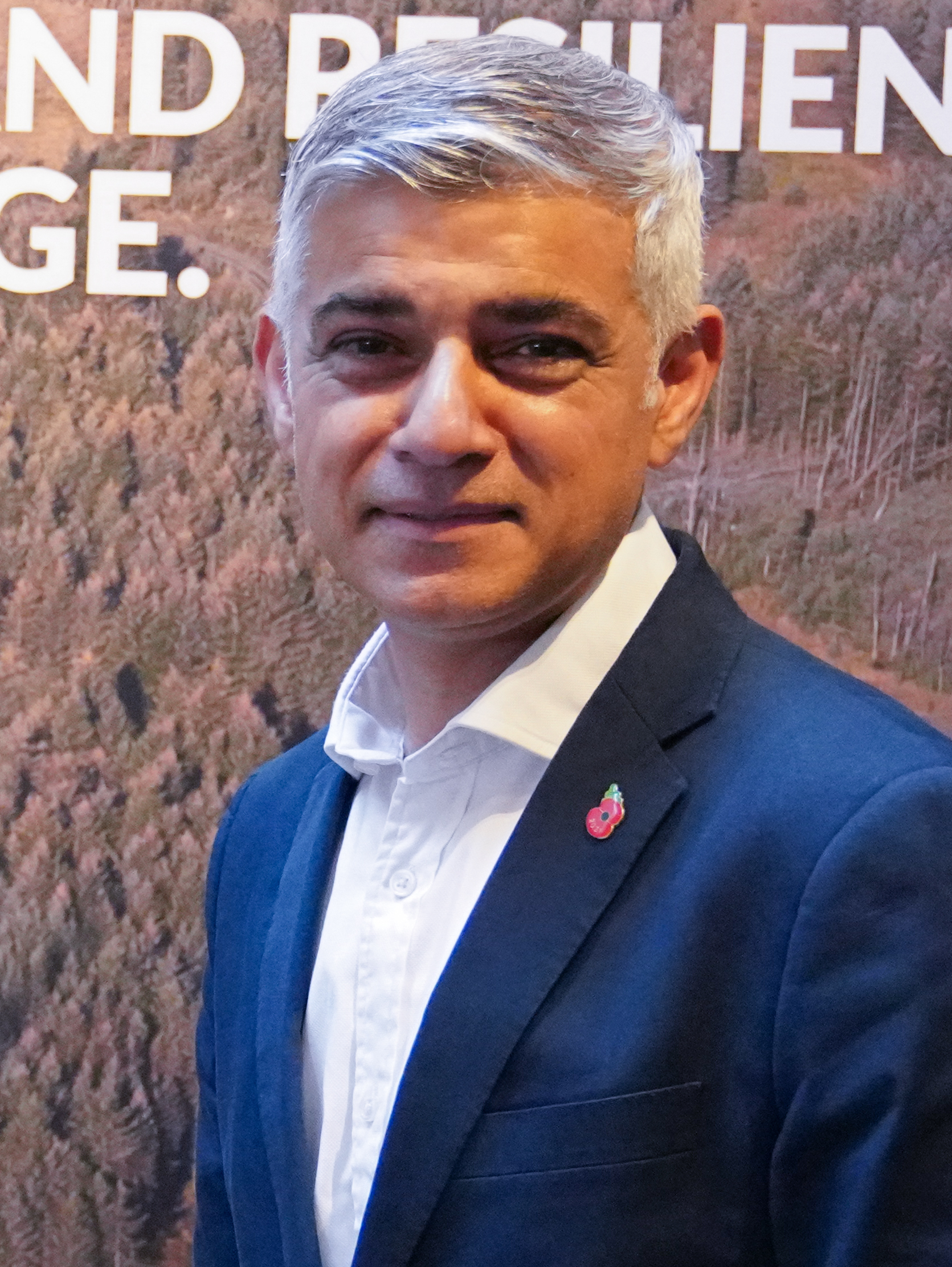
Sadiq Khan

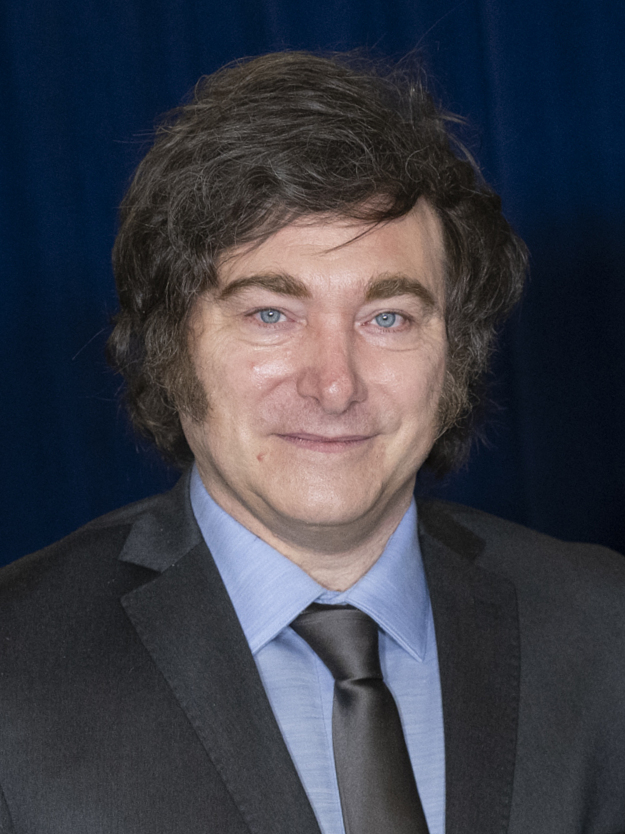
Javier Milei

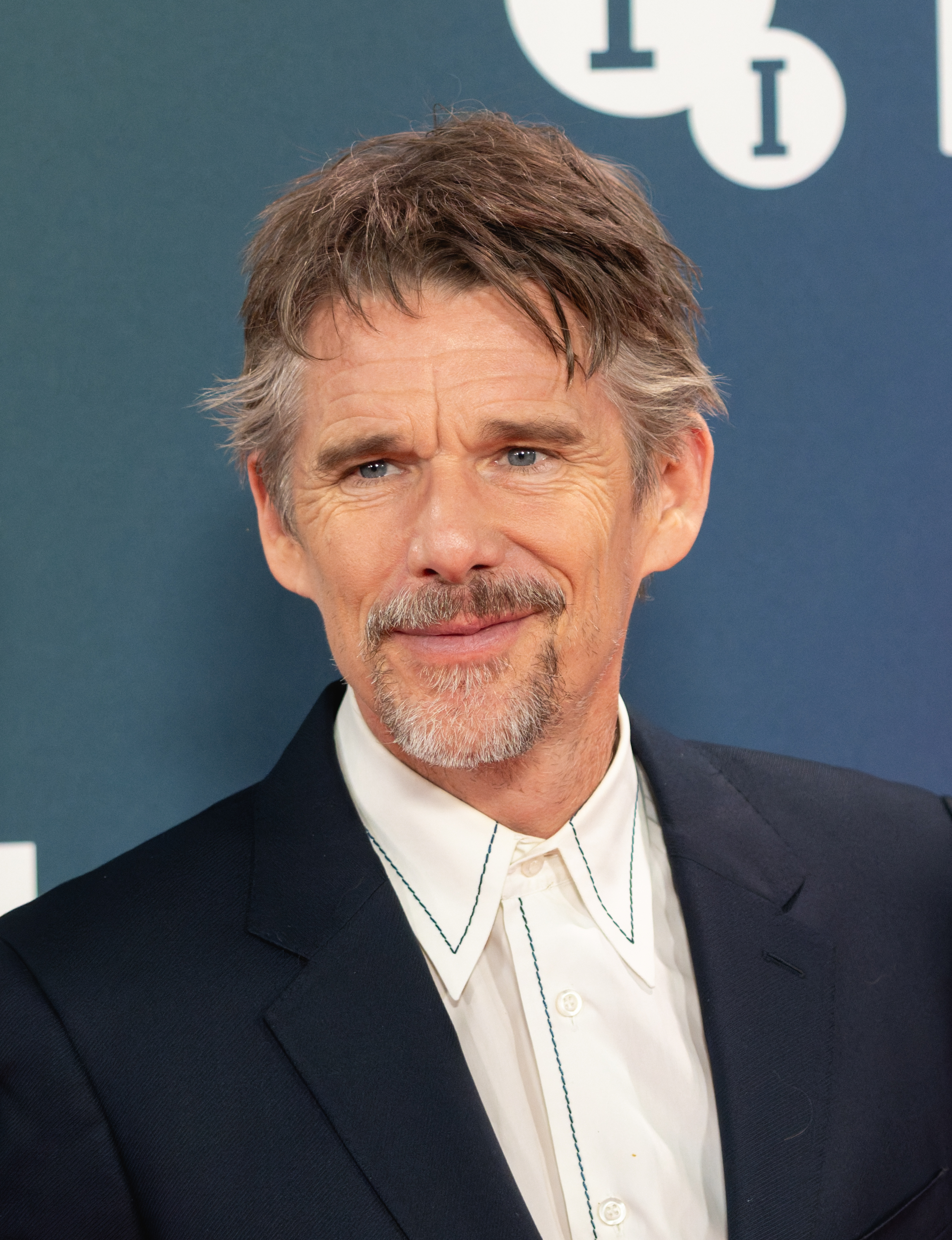
Ethan Hawke

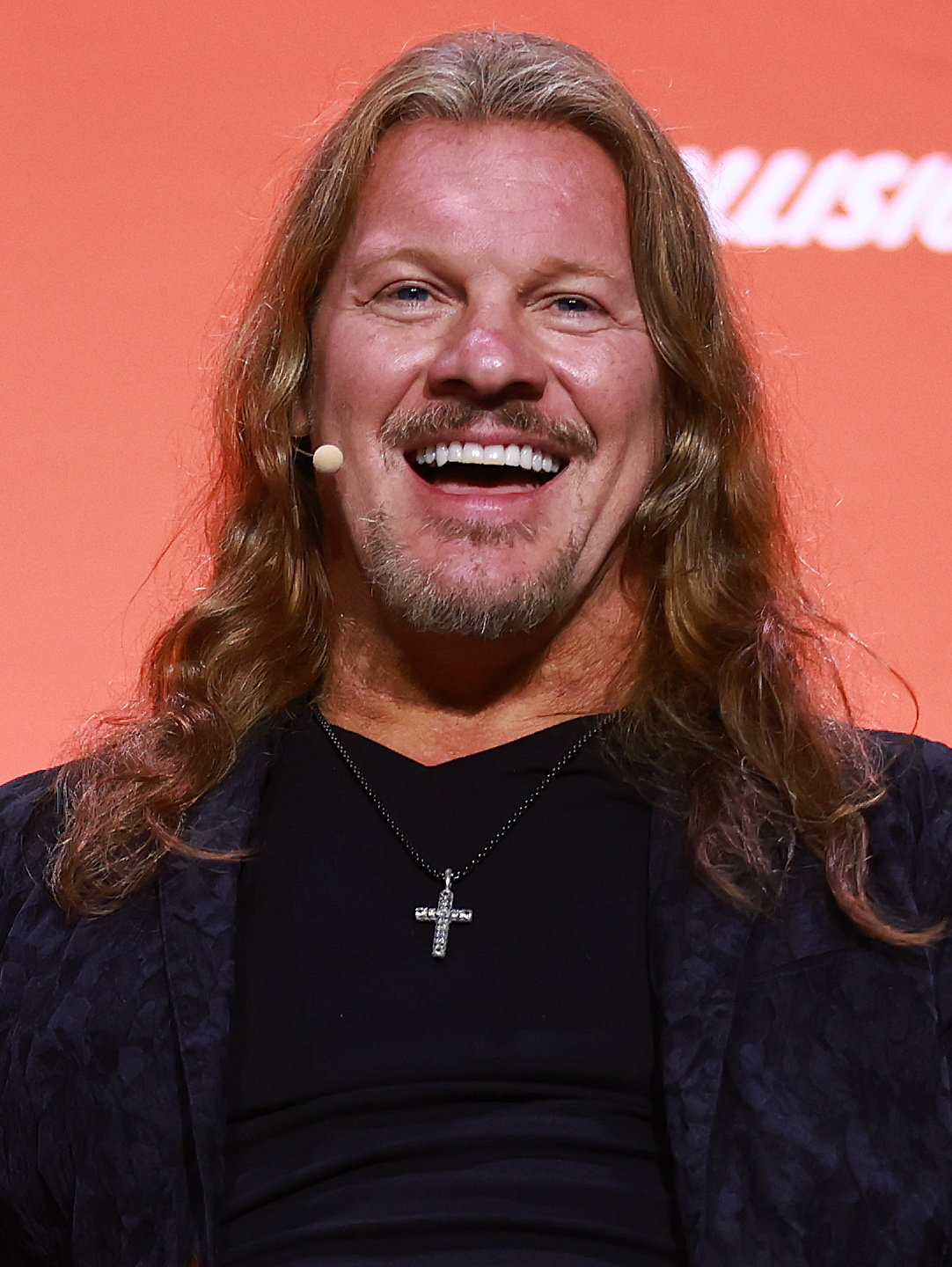
Chris Jericho

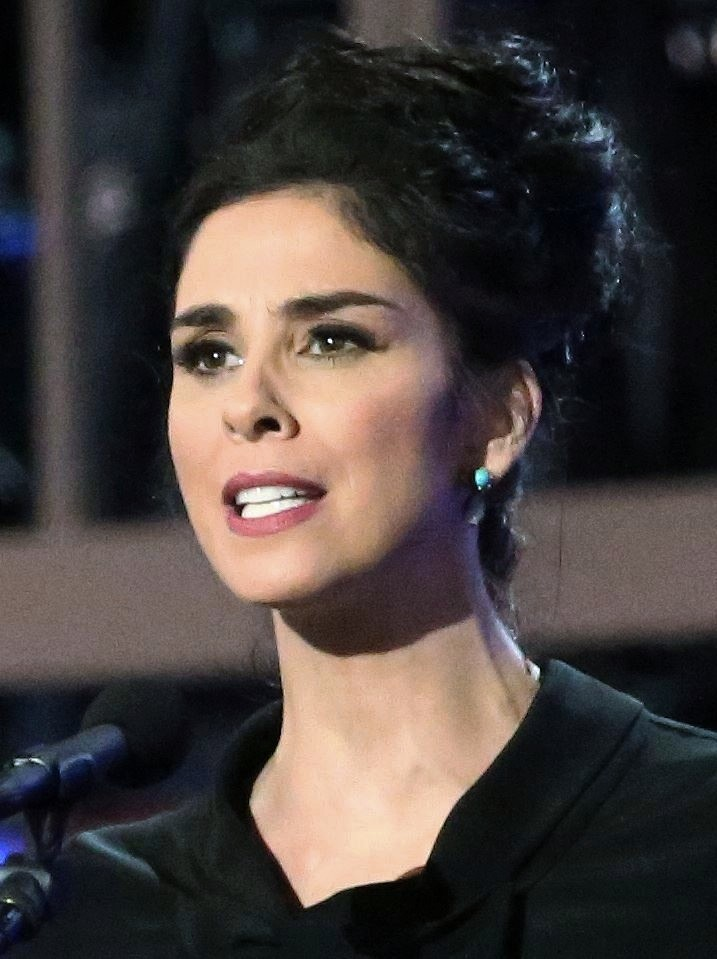
Sarah Silverman

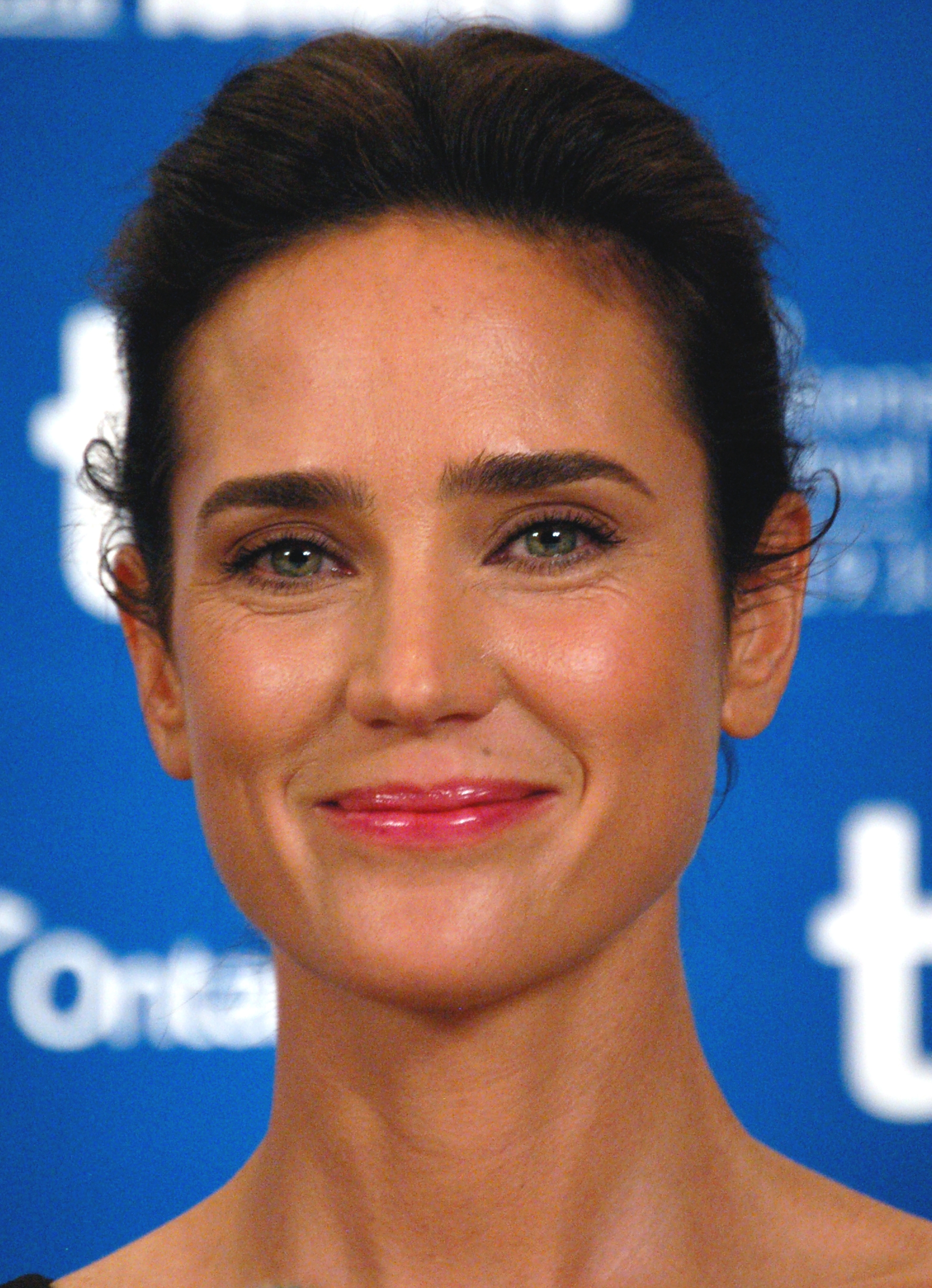
Jennifer Connelly

=== January ===
- January 1 – Gabriel Jarret, American actor
- January 2
  - Oksana Omelianchik, Soviet artistic gymnast
  - Eric Whitacre, American composer
- January 7 - Andy Burnham, British politician, Prime Minister and Mayor of Greater Manchester (2017–2026)
- January 9 – Lara Fabian, Canadian/Belgian singer
- January 12 – Zack de la Rocha, American musician
- January 13
  - Marco Pantani, Italian cyclist (d. 2004)
  - Shonda Rhimes, American TV producer and writer
- January 15 – Shane McMahon, American businessman and professional wrestler
- January 17 – Genndy Tartakovsky, Russian-American animator
- January 18 – Keisha Lance Bottoms, American politician, Governor-elect of Georgia
- January 20 – Skeet Ulrich, American actor
- January 21 – Ken Leung, American actor
- January 24 – Matthew Lillard, American actor, presenter, director and producer
- January 29
  - Heather Graham, American actress
  - Paul Ryan, American politician
- January 31 – Minnie Driver, English actress

=== February ===
- February 3 – Warwick Davis, English actor
- February 4 – Hunter Biden, American attorney and son of U.S. president Joe Biden
- February 8 – Alonzo Mourning, American basketball player
- February 9 – Glenn McGrath, Australian test cricketer
- February 10 – Ardy Wiranata, Indonesian badminton player
- February 11 – Adi Hutter, Austrian football manager and former player
- February 12 – Edgardo Caldona, Filipino associate justice of the Sandiganbayan
- February 13 – Park Hee-soon, South Korean actor
- February 14 – Simon Pegg, British comedian, actor and screenwriter
- February 16 – Armand Van Helden, American DJ and music producer
- February 17
  - Tommy Moe, American Alpine skier
  - Dominic Purcell, English-Australian actor
- February 18
  - Raine Maida, Canadian singer-songwriter and musician
  - Susan Egan, American actress, voice actress, singer and dancer
- February 26 – Cathrine Lindahl, Swedish curler
- February 28
  - Daniel Handler, American author
  - Noureddine Morceli, Algerian athlete

=== March ===
- March 2 – Alexander Armstrong, English comedian, actor and presenter
- March 3 – Julie Bowen, American actress
- March 5
  - John Frusciante, American rock musician
  - Aleksandar Vučić, President of Serbia
- March 7
  - Petra Mede, Swedish comedian, dancer, actress and television presenter
  - Rachel Weisz, British-American actress
- March 10
  - Antonio Edwards, American football player
  - Michel van der Aa, Dutch composer
- March 13 – Carme Chacón, Spanish politician (d. 2017)
- March 16 – Paul Oscar, Icelandic pop singer-songwriter and DJ
- March 18 – Queen Latifah, American rapper and actress
- March 21 – Jaya, Filipino pop singer
- March 22 – Leontien van Moorsel, Dutch cyclist
- March 24
  - Lara Flynn Boyle, American actress
  - Sharon Corr, Irish musician
- March 27
  - Maribel Díaz Cabello, Peruvian educator, First Lady of Peru
  - Elizabeth Mitchell, American actress
  - Leila Pahlavi, Iranian princess (d. 2001)
- March 28 – Vince Vaughn, American actor, writer and producer
- March 30 – Karim Ahmad Khan, British barrister and prosecutor, Prosecutor of the International Criminal Court (2021–2026)
- March 31 – Alenka Bratušek, 7th Prime Minister of Slovenia

=== April ===
- April 4
  - Rebekka Bakken, Norwegian singer
  - Barry Pepper, Canadian actor
- April 7 – Rosey, Samoan-American professional wrestler (d. 2017)
- April 8 – Andrej Plenković, 12th Prime Minister of Croatia
- April 10
  - José Paulo Lanyi, Brazilian journalist, writer and filmmaker
  - Q-Tip, American musician and actor
  - Phi Nhung, Vietnamese-born American singer (d. 2021)
- April 11 – Trevor Linden, Canadian hockey player
- April 13 – Ricky Schroder, American actor
- April 14 – Anna Kinberg Batra, Swedish politician
- April 17 – Redman, American rapper and actor
- April 18
  - Heike Friedrich, German swimmer
  - Saad Hariri, 2-Time Prime Minister of Lebanon
- April 19 – Luis Miguel, Mexican singer
- April 20 – Shemar Moore, American actor
- April 21
  - Rob Riggle, American actor and comedian
  - Nicole Sullivan, American actress, comedian and writer
- April 22 – Regine Velasquez, Filipino singer and actress
- April 23
  - Sadao Abe, Japanese actor
  - Andrew Gee, Australian rugby league footballer
- April 25
  - Kate Allen, Australian born-Austrian triathlete
  - Tomoko Kawakami, Japanese voice actress (d. 2011)
  - Jason Lee, American skateboarder and actor
- April 26
  - Melania Trump, Slovenian model, First Lady of the United States
  - Tionne Watkins, American actress and singer-songwriter
- April 28
  - Kurt Eversley, Guyanese-born cricketer
  - Nicklas Lidström, Swedish hockey player
  - Diego Simeone, Argentine footballer and manager
- April 29
  - Andre Agassi, American tennis player
  - Uma Thurman, American actress
- April 30 – Halit Ergenç, Turkish actor

=== May ===
- May 3
  - Bobby Cannavale, American actor
  - Ariel Hernandez, Cuban boxer
- May 4
  - Will Arnett, Canadian actor
  - Dawn Staley, American basketball coach
- May 5 – Zorana Mihajlović, Serbian politician
- May 6 – Roland Kun, Nauruan politician
- May 7 — Jenny Saville, English artist
- May 8
  - Michael Bevan, Australian cricketer
  - Luis Enrique, Spanish footballer
  - Naomi Klein, Canadian author and activist
- May 9
  - Hao Haidong, Chinese footballer
  - Ghostface Killah, American rapper
- May 10 – Angelica Agurbash, Belarusian singer and model
- May 12 – Samantha Mathis, American actress
- May 15 – Ronald and Frank de Boer, Dutch footballers
- May 16 – Gabriela Sabatini, Argentine tennis player
- May 17 – Giovanna Trillini, Italian fencer
- May 18 – Tina Fey, American comedian and actress
- May 19 – K. J. Choi, South Korean golfer
- May 20
  - Juliana Pasha, Albanian singer
  - Louis Theroux, Singaporean-English journalist and producer
- May 22 – Naomi Campbell, British model and actress
- May 25
  - Jamie Kennedy, American actor and comedian
  - Octavia Spencer, American actress
- May 26 – Nobuhiro Watsuki, Japanese cartoonist
- May 27
  - Joseph Fiennes, British actor
  - Bianka Panova, Bulgarian rhythmic gymnast
- May 28 – Glenn Quinn, Irish actor (d. 2002)
- May 30 – Erick Thohir, Indonesian politician and businessman

=== June ===
- June 1
  - R. Madhavan, Indian film actor
  - Karen Mulder, Dutch model and singer
- June 2 – B-Real, American rapper
- June 3 – Peter Tägtgren, Swedish musician
- June 4 – Izabella Scorupco, Polish model and actress
- June 5 – Deborah Yates, American dancer and actress
- June 7
  - Alexander Dobrindt, German politician, Federal Minister of the Interior
  - Cafu, Brazilian footballer and politician
  - Mike Modano, American hockey player
- June 8
  - Gabby Giffords, American politician
  - Kelli Williams, American actress
- June 13
  - Rivers Cuomo, American musician, frontman of Weezer
  - Mikael Ljungberg, Swedish wrestler (d. 2004)
- June 15 – Leah Remini, American actress
- June 16
  - Younus AlGohar, Pakistani spiritualist
  - Phil Mickelson, American golfer
- June 17 – Will Forte, American actor and comedian
- June 19 – Quincy Watts, American athlete
- June 20
  - Russell Garcia, British field hockey player
  - Moulay Rachid, Prince of Morocco
  - Michelle Reis, Hong Kong actress and beauty queen
  - Athol Williams, South African poet and social philosopher
- June 21 – Pete Rock, American rapper and DJ
- June 22 – Michel Elefteriades, Greek-Lebanese politician, artist, producer and businessman
- June 23 – Marko Albrecht, German disc jockey and electronic producer
- June 24
  - Glenn Medeiros, American singer-songwriter
  - Daniel Sánchez Arévalo, Spanish screenwriter and film director
- June 25 – Pan Lingling, Singaporean actress
- June 26
  - Paul Thomas Anderson, American screenwriter and director
  - Sean Hayes, American actor
  - Paweł Nastula, Polish judoka and mixed martial artist
  - Chris O'Donnell, American actor
- June 27 – Ahmed Ahmed, Egyptian-born American actor and comedian
- June 30
  - Leonardo Sbaraglia, Argentine actor
  - Erica Sjöström, Swedish female singer and saxophonist

=== July ===
- July 2
  - Derrick Adkins, American Olympic athlete
  - Md. Mobasher Alam Bhuiyan, Bangladesh politician
  - Yap Kim Hock, Malaysian badminton player
  - Steve Morrow, Northern Irish footballer
  - Kym Ng, Singaporean television host and actress
- July 3
  - Serhiy Honchar, Ukrainian road racing cyclist
  - Audra McDonald, American actress and singer
- July 7
  - Wayne McCullough, Northern Irish boxer
  - Masai Ujiri, Nigerian professional basketball executive
  - Atli Örvarsson, Icelandic film score composer
- July 8
  - Beck, American singer-songwriter and record producer
  - Todd Martin, American tennis player
- July 10
  - Jason Orange, British singer
  - John Simm, British actor
- July 11 – Justin Chambers, American actor and fashion model
- July 12
  - Lee Byung-hun, South Korean actor, singer and model
  - Aure Atika, French actress, writer and director
  - Susan Tyler Witten, American politician
- July 13 – Bruno Salomone, French actor and comedian
- July 17
  - Jang Hyun-sung, South Korean actor
  - Gavin McInnes, Canadian writer and political commentator (co-founder of Vice Media)
- July 19
  - Nicola Sturgeon, First Minister of Scotland (2014–present)
  - Christopher Luxon, 42nd Prime Minister of New Zealand
- July 20 – Tunku Abdul Majid
- July 22 – Jonathan Zaccaï, Belgian actor, film director and screenwriter
- July 23
  - Thea Dorn, German writer
  - Saulius Skvernelis, Prime Minister of Lithuania
- July 31 - Amanda Stepto, Canadian actress

=== August ===
- August 1
  - David James, English football goalkeeper
  - Elon Lindenstrauss, Israeli mathematician
- August 2 – Kevin Smith, American screenwriter, film director and actor
- August 3 – Masahiro Sakurai, Japanese video game director, designer and writer
- August 4 – Hakeem Jeffries, American politician
- August 5 – Konstantin Yeryomenko, Russian futsal player (d. 2010)
- August 6 – M. Night Shyamalan, Indian-American film director and writer
- August 10
  - Brendon Julian, New Zealand cricket player
  - Steve Mautone, Australian football player and coach
- August 11 – Daniella Perez, Brazilian actress and ballerina (d. 1992)
- August 13 – Alan Shearer, English footballer
- August 14 – Leah Purcell, Australian actress
- August 15 – Anthony Anderson, American actor
- August 16
  - Saif Ali Khan, Indian actor
  - Manisha Koirala, Indian actress
- August 17 – Jim Courier, American tennis player
- August 20
  - Els Callens, Belgian tennis player
  - Fred Durst, American rapper
- August 21
  - Erik Dekker, Dutch professional cyclist
  - Cathy Weseluck, Canadian actress and comedian
- August 22
  - Giada De Laurentiis, Italian-American celebrity chef
  - Ricco Groß, German biathlete
  - Tímea Nagy, Hungarian fencer
- August 23
  - Jay Mohr, American actor and comedian
  - River Phoenix, American actor (d. 1993)
- August 25
  - Sille Lundquist, Danish fashion model and author (d. 2018)
  - Claudia Schiffer, German model
- August 26
  - Olimpiada Ivanova, Russian race walker
  - Melissa McCarthy, American actress, comedian and film producer
- August 27
  - Peter Ebdon, English snooker player
  - Jim Thome, American baseball player, MLB Hall of Fame member
  - Karl Unterkircher, Italian mountaineer (d. 2008)
- August 29 – Alessandra Negrini, Brazilian actress
- August 31
  - Debbie Gibson, American singer
  - Queen Rania of Jordan, Queen consort of Jordan

=== September ===
- September 1 – Hwang Jung-min, South Korean actor
- September 3 – Jeremy Glick, passenger on board United Airlines Flight 93 (d. 2001)
- September 7
  - Gao Min, Chinese diver
  - Tom Everett Scott, American actor
- September 9
  - Biju Menon, Indian film actor
  - Như Quỳnh, Vietnamese-American singer
- September 10 – Julie Halard-Decugis, French tennis player
- September 11 – Taraji P. Henson, American actress
- September 12 – Amala Akkineni, Indian actress, dancer and activist
- September 14
  - Ketanji Brown Jackson, American jurist and associate justice of the Supreme Court of the United States
  - Mike Burns, American soccer player
- September 17 – Valeria Cappellotto, Italian racing cyclist. (d. 2015)
- September 18
  - Darren Gough, English cricketer
  - Aisha Tyler, American actress
- September 19 – Takanori Nishikawa, Japanese singer
- September 20 – Gert Verheyen, Belgian footballer
- September 21 – Samantha Power, Irish-American government official and writer
- September 22 – Emmanuel Petit, French footballer
- September 23 – Ani DiFranco, American-Canadian musician
- September 26
  - Marco Etcheverry, Bolivian footballer
  - Yukio Iketani, Japanese gymnast
- September 27 – Yoshiharu Habu, Japanese professional shogi player
- September 28 – Kimiko Date, Japanese tennis player
- September 29
  - Ninel Conde, Mexican actress, singer and television host
  - Emily Lloyd, English actress
  - Yoshihiro Tajiri, Japanese professional wrestler
- September 30 – Tony Hale, American actor

=== October ===
- October 1 – Moses Kiptanui, Kenyan athlete
- October 4 – Zdravko Zdravkov, Bulgarian footballer
- October 8
  - Matt Damon, American actor
  - Sadiq Khan, British politician; 3rd Mayor of London (2016–present)
  - Tetsuya Nomura, Japanese video game and film director
- October 9 – Annika Sörenstam, Swedish golfer
- October 10
  - Sir Matthew Pinsent, British rower
  - Jokelyn Tienstra, Dutch handball player (d. 2015)
- October 12 – Kirk Cameron, American actor and Christian activist
- October 14 – Daniela Peštová, Czech supermodel
- October 16 – Mehmet Scholl, German footballer
- October 17 – Anil Kumble, Indian cricketer
- October 20 – Michelle Malkin, American political commentator
- October 21 – Louis Koo, Hong Kong actor
- October 24 – Stephen Kipkorir, Kenyan middle-distance runner (d. 2008)
- October 25 – Adam Goldberg, American actor
- October 26 – Chavo Guerrero Jr., Mexican-American professional wrestler
- October 29 – Edwin van der Sar, Dutch footballer
- October 30
  - Nia Long, American actress
  - Xie Jun, Chinese chess grandmaster
- October 31 – Linn Berggren, Swedish singer

=== November ===
- November 1
  - Toma Enache, Romanian film director
  - Merle Palmiste, Estonian actress
- November 6 – Ethan Hawke, American actor, writer and film director
- November 7 – Marc Rosset, Swiss tennis player
- November 9 – Chris Jericho, American-Canadian professional wrestler
- November 10 – Warren G, American rapper
- November 12 – Tonya Harding, American figure skater
- November 15
  - Uschi Disl, German biathlete
  - Patrick M'Boma, Cameroonian footballer
- November 16 – Martha Plimpton, American actress
- November 17 – Paul Allender, English guitarist
- November 18
  - Megyn Kelly, American journalist and television host
  - Peta Wilson, Australian actress
- November 23 – Oded Fehr, Israeli-American actor
- November 24 – Julieta Venegas, American born-Mexican singer, guitarist and producer
- November 27
  - Andreína Mujica, Venezuelan journalist and photographer.
  - Jorge Luis González Tanquero, Cuban dissident (d. 2016)
- November 28
  - Richard Osman, English television presenter, producer and director
  - Édouard Philippe, French politician, 100th Prime Minister of France
- November 30
  - Yayuk Basuki, Indonesian tennis player
  - Natalie Williams, American basketball player

=== December ===
- December 1 – Sarah Silverman, American stand-up comedian, actress, singer, producer and writer
- December 3
  - Christian Karembeu, French footballer
  - Jimmy Shergill, Indian actor
- December 4 – Kevin Sussman, American actor and comedian
- December 5 – Tim Hetherington, English-born photojournalist (d. 2011)
- December 6
  - Adrian Fenty, American politician and mayor of Washington, D.C. (2007–2011)
  - Michaela Schaffrath, German actress
- December 9 – Kara DioGuardi, American songwriter, producer and singer
- December 10 – Lê Minh Hưng, Prime Minister of Vietnam
- December 11 – Chris Henderson, American soccer player
- December 12
  - Mädchen Amick, American actress
  - Jennifer Connelly, American actress
  - Regina Hall, American actress
- December 13 – Võ Văn Thưởng, 12th President of Vietnam
- December 14 – Andrew Lewis, Guyanese professional boxer (d. 2015)
- December 18
  - DMX, American rapper and actor (d. 2021)
  - Rob Van Dam, American professional wrestler
- December 22
  - Yuriko Backes, Luxembourgish diplomat and politician
  - Ted Cruz, Canadian-American politician, U.S. Senator (R-Tx.) from 2013 and 2016 presidential candidate
  - Gary Anderson, Scottish darts player
- December 23 – Catriona Le May Doan, Canadian speed skater
- December 24 – Przemysław Branny, Polish actor and singer
- December 25 – Emmanuel Amuneke, Nigerian footballer
- December 26 – Krissada Sukosol Clapp, Thai actor and singer
- December 28
  - Yolanda Andrade, Mexican actress and television presenter
  - Elaine Hendrix, American actress

== Deaths ==
=== January ===
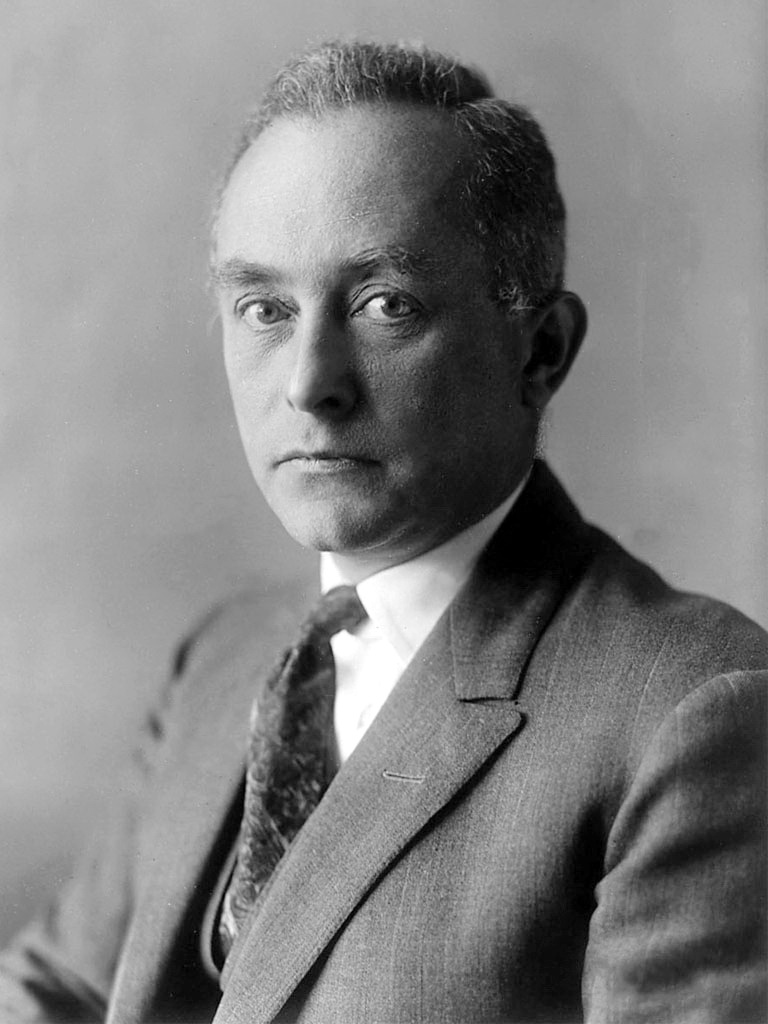
Max Born

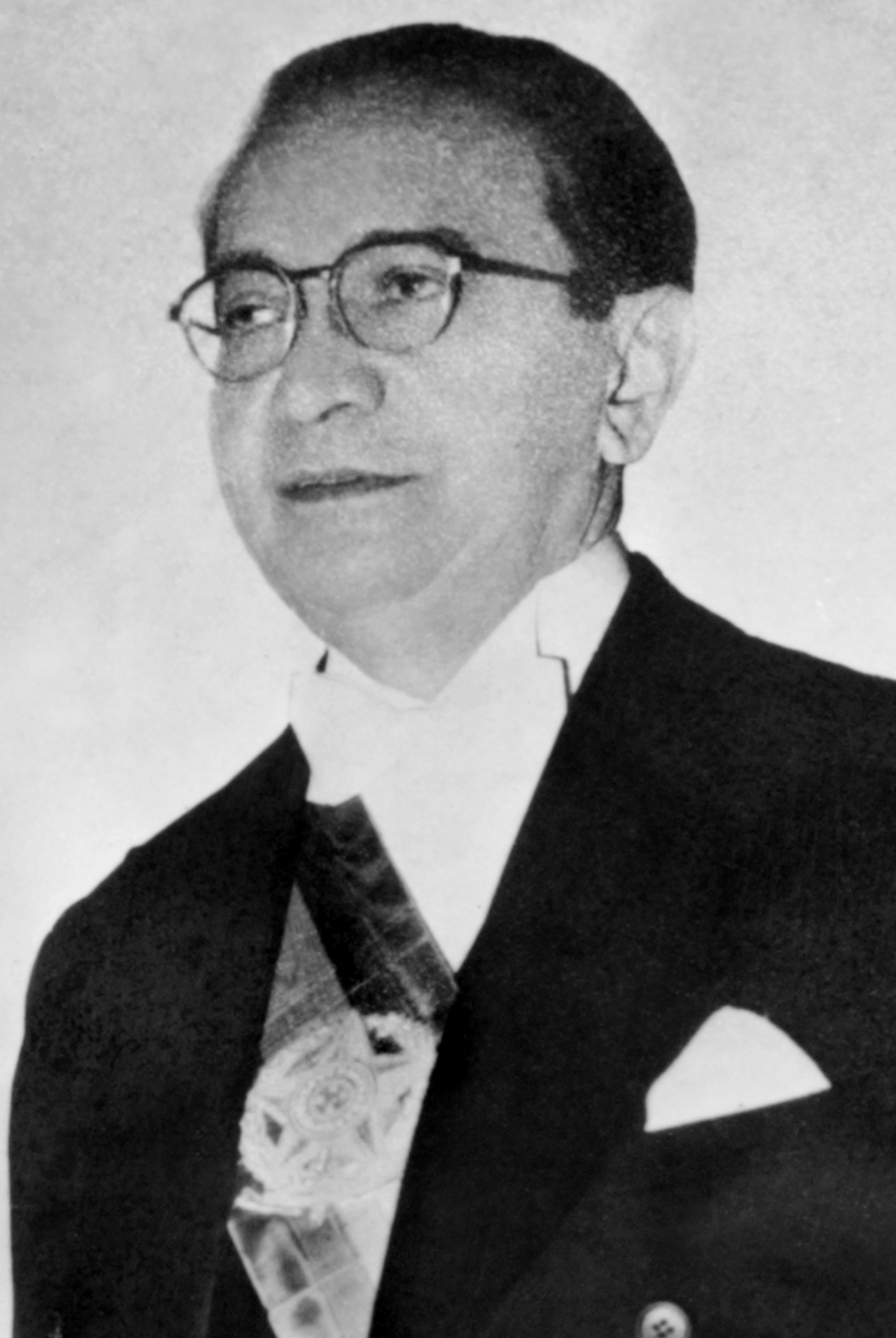
Joao Cafe Filho

- January 5 – Max Born, German physicist, Nobel Prize laureate (b. 1882)
- January 10 – Pavel Belyayev, Soviet cosmonaut (b. 1925)
- January 17 – Joseph Civello, boss of the Dallas mafia.
- January 18 – David O. McKay, 9th president of the Church of Jesus Christ of Latter-day Saints (b. 1873)
- January 25 – Eiji Tsuburaya, Japanese film director and special effects designer (b. 1901)
- January 27 – Erich Heckel, German painter (b. 1883)
- January 29
  - Sir Basil Liddell Hart, British military historian (b. 1895)
  - Thelma Furness, Viscountess Furness, American socialite (b. 1904)
- January 31 – Slim Harpo, American singer (b. 1924)

=== February ===
- February 2 – Bertrand Russell, British logician and philosopher, recipient of the Nobel Prize in Literature (b. 1872)
- February 3 – Italo Gariboldi, Italian general (b. 1879)
- February 7 – Abe Attell, American boxer (b. 1883)
- February 14
  - Arthur Edeson, American cinematographer (b. 1891)
  - Harry Stradling, American cinematographer (b. 1901)
- February 15 – Hugh Dowding, 1st Baron Dowding, British RAF Fighter Commander during the Battle of Britain (b. 1882)
- February 16 – Francis Peyton Rous, American pathologist, recipient of the Nobel Prize in Physiology or Medicine (b. 1879)
- February 17
  - Shmuel Yosef Agnon, Israeli writer, Nobel Prize laureate (b. 1888)
  - Alfred Newman, American film composer (b. 1900)
- February 19 – Jules Munshin, American actor (b. 1915)
- February 20
  - Café Filho, Brazilian politician, 18th President of Brazil (b. 1899)
  - Sophie Treadwell, American playwright and journalist (b. 1885)
- February 22 – Dora Boothby, English tennis champion (b. 1881)
- February 24 – Conrad Nagel, American actor (b. 1897)
- February 25 – Mark Rothko, Latvian-born American painter (b. 1903)

=== March ===
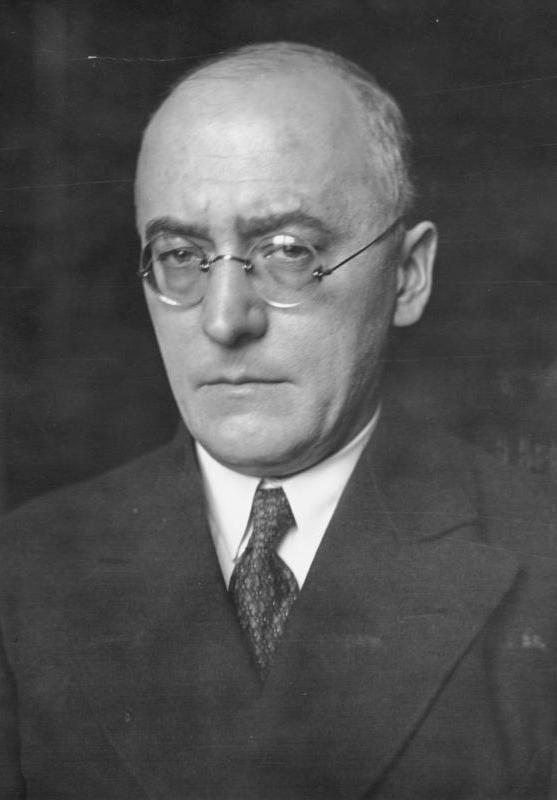
Heinrich Brüning

- March 6 – William Hopper, American actor (b. 1915)
- March 11 – Erle Stanley Gardner, American crime writer (b. 1889)
- March 15 – Arthur Adamov, Russian-French playwright (b. 1908)
- March 16 – Tammi Terrell, American singer (b. 1945)
- March 18 – William Beaudine, American film director (b. 1892)
- March 21 – Marlen Haushofer, Austrian author (b. 1920)
- March 29 – Vera Brittain, British writer (b. 1893)
- March 30 – Heinrich Brüning, German academic and politician, 21st Chancellor of Germany (b. 1885)
- March 31 – Semyon Timoshenko, Soviet general, Marshal of the Soviet Union (b. 1895)

=== April ===
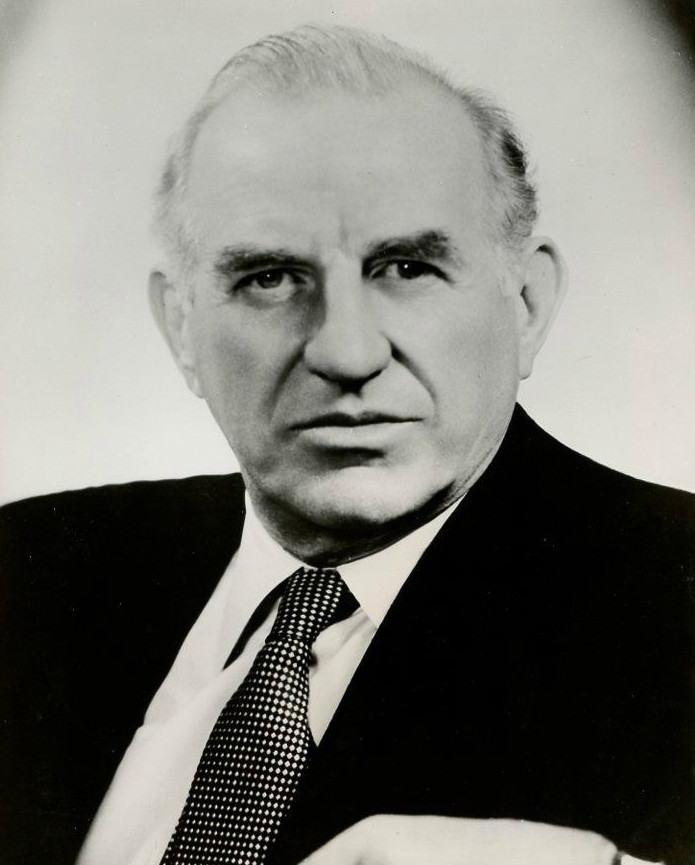
Ed Begley

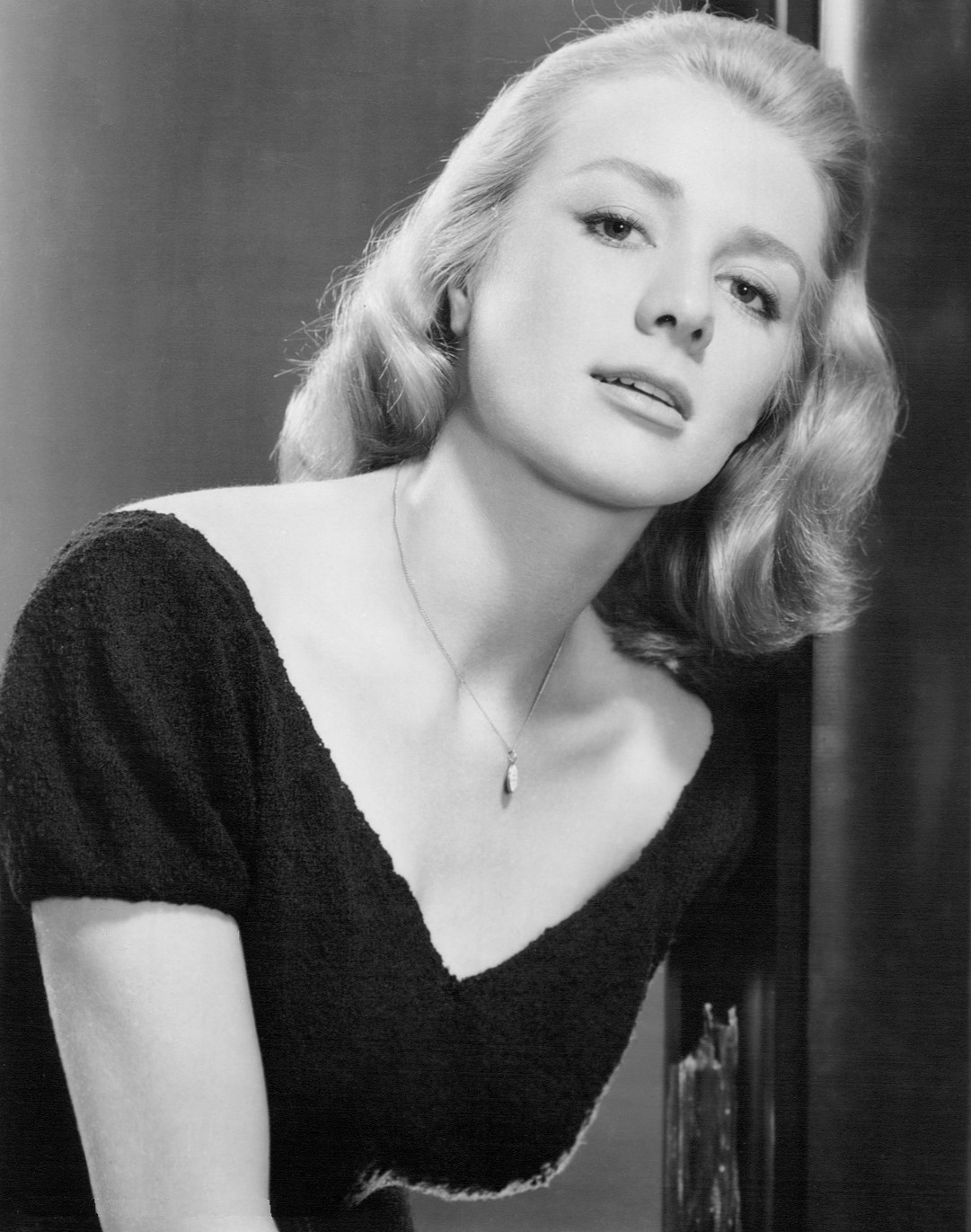
Inger Stevens

- April 1
  - Polina Zhemchuzhina, Soviet politician (b. 1897)
  - Ludolf von Alvensleben, German Nazi functionary, SS and police leader (b. 1901)
- April 4 – Byron Foulger, American actor (b. 1898)
- April 5
  - Louisa Bolus, South African botanist and taxonomist (b. 1877)
  - Alfred Henry Sturtevant, American geneticist (b. 1891)
- April 6 – Maurice Stokes, American basketball player (b. 1933)
- April 8
  - Prince Felix of Bourbon-Parma, consort of Grand Duchess Charlotte (b. 1893)
  - Julius Pokorny, Austrian-born Czech linguist (b. 1887)
- April 11
  - Cathy O'Donnell, American actress (b. 1923)
  - John O'Hara, American writer (b. 1905)
- April 16 – Richard Neutra, Austrian-born American architect (b. 1892)
- April 17 – Patriarch Alexy I of Moscow (b. 1877)
- April 18 – Michał Kalecki, Polish economist (b. 1899)
- April 20 – Paul Celan, Romanian poet (b. 1920)
- April 26
  - Francisco Cunha Leal, Portuguese politician, 84th Prime Minister of Portugal (b. 1888)
  - Gypsy Rose Lee, American actress (b. 1911)
- April 27 – Arthur Shields, Irish actor (b. 1896)
- April 28 – Ed Begley, American actor (b. 1901)
- April 30 – Inger Stevens, Swedish-born American actress (b. 1934)

=== May ===
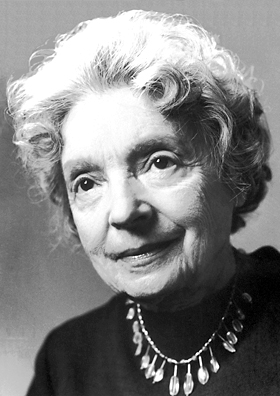
Nelly Sachs

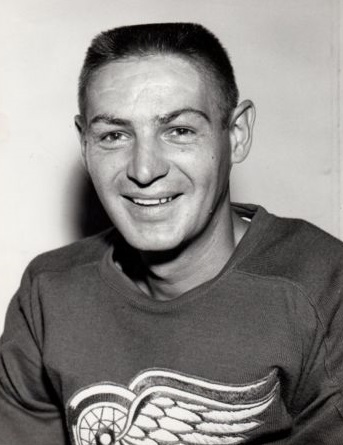
Terry Sawchuk

- May 1
  - Ralph Hartley, American inventor (b. 1888)
  - Yi Un, Crown Prince of Korea (b. 1897)
- May 9 – Walter Reuther, American labor union leader and president of the United Auto Workers (b. 1907)
- May 11 – Johnny Hodges, American jazz musician (b. 1907)
- May 12
  - Władysław Anders, General of the Polish Army (b. 1892)
  - Nelly Sachs, German writer, Nobel Prize laureate (b. 1891)
- May 13 – Sir William Dobell, Australian artist (b. 1899)
- May 14 – Billie Burke, American actress (b. 1884)
- May 17 – Heinz Hartmann, Austrian psychiatrist and psychoanalyst (b. 1894)
- May 22 – Mahmoud Zulfikar, Egyptian film director (b. 1914)
- May 24 – Phan Khắc Sửu, South Vietnamese politician and Chief of State of the Republic of Vietnam (b. 1893)
- May 28 – Iuliu Hossu, Romanian Roman Catholic bishop and servant of God (b. 1885)
- May 29
  - John Gunther, American writer (b. 1901)
  - Eva Hesse, German-born American sculptor (b. 1936)
- May 31 – Terry Sawchuk, Canadian ice hockey player (b. 1929)

=== June ===
Sukarno

- June 1 – Pedro Eugenio Aramburu, 31st President of Argentina (b. 1903)
- June 2 – Bruce McLaren, founder of McLaren Racing (b. 1937)
- June 3 – Hjalmar Schacht, Nazi German economic minister (b. 1877)
- June 7
  - E. M. Forster, English writer (b. 1879)
  - Manuel Gómez-Moreno Martínez, Spanish archaeologist and historian (b. 1870)
- June 8 – Abraham Maslow, American psychologist (b. 1908)
- June 9 – Rafael Ángel Calderón Guardia, 19th President of Costa Rica (b. 1900)
- June 10 – Bartolomé Blanche, Chilean military officer, provisional President of Chile (b. 1879)
- June 11 – Alexander Kerensky, Russian revolutionary politician (b. 1881)
- June 14 – Roman Ingarden, Polish philosopher (b. 1893)
- June 16 – Heino Eller, Estonian composer and composition teacher (b. 1887)
- June 18 - Zhang Jingsheng, Chinese writer and sexologist
- June 21 – Sukarno, 1st President of Indonesia (b. 1901)
- June 26 – Leopoldo Marechal, Argentine writer (b. 1900)

=== July ===
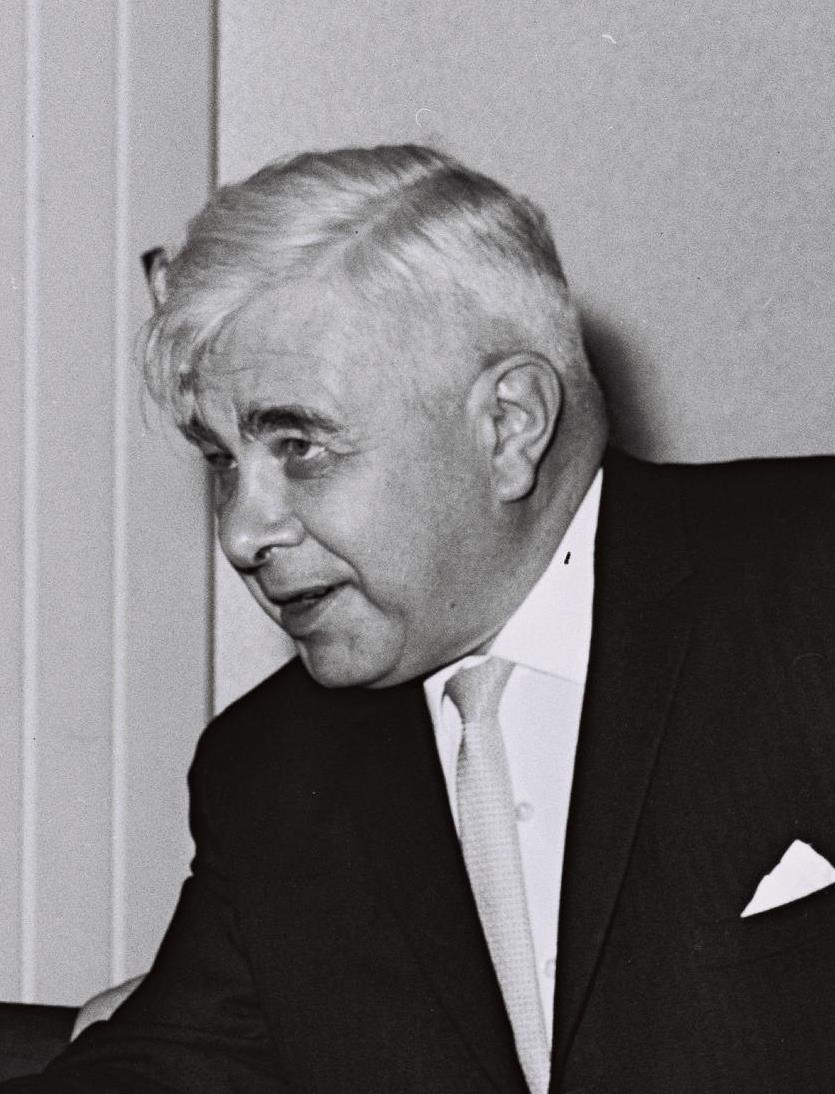
Bjarni Benediktsson

- July 4 – Barnett Newman, American painter (b. 1905)
- July 6 – Marjorie Rambeau, American actress (b. 1889)
- July 7 – Sylvester Wiere, Austro-Hungarian-born American slapstick comedian, member of the Wiere Brothers (b. 1909)
- July 10 – Bjarni Benediktsson, 11th Prime Minister of Iceland (b. 1908)
- July 13
  - Leslie Groves, American general, director of the Manhattan Project (b. 1896)
  - Sheng Shicai, Chinese warlord (b. 1895)
- July 14 – Luis Mariano, Spanish tenor (b. 1914)
- July 19
  - Egon Eiermann, German architect (b. 1904)
  - Panagiotis Pipinelis, Prime Minister of Greece (b. 1899)
- July 22 – Fritz Kortner, Austrian-born director (b. 1892)
- July 23 – Amadeo Bordiga, Italian Marxist (b. 1889)
- July 27 – António de Oliveira Salazar, Portuguese economist and politician, 100th Prime Minister of Portugal (b. 1889)
- July 29 – Sir John Barbirolli, English conductor (b. 1899)
- July 30 – George Szell, Hungarian conductor (b. 1897)
- July 31 – Sir Wilfrid Kent Hughes, Australian Olympian and politician (b. 1895)

=== August ===
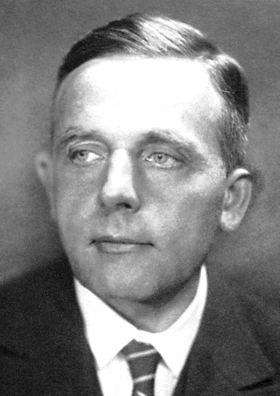
Otto Heinrich Warburg

- August 1
  - Frances Farmer, American actress and television host (b. 1913)
  - Giuseppe Pizzardo, Italian Roman Catholic cardinal (b. 1877)
  - Otto Heinrich Warburg, German physician and physiologist, Nobel Prize in Physiology or Medicine laureate (b. 1883)
- August 7 – Tomu Uchida, Japanese film director (b. 1898)
- August 8 – Jerry Dawson, English footballer (b. 1888)
- August 10 – Bernd Alois Zimmermann, German composer (b. 1918)
- August 18 – Soledad Miranda, Spanish actress (b. 1943)
- August 19 – Paweł Jasienica, Polish historian (b. 1909)
- August 20 – Zeki Velidi Togan, Turkish historian (b. 1890)
- August 22 –
  - Bill Decker, Sheriff of the Dallas County police
  - Vladimir Propp, Soviet folklorist (b. 1895)
- August 23 – Abdallah Khalil, 3rd Prime Minister of Sudan (b. 1892)
- August 27 – Daniel Kinsey, American hurdler, Olympic champion (1924) (b. 1902)
- August 30 – Del Moore, American actor, comedian and radio announcer (b. 1916)

=== September ===
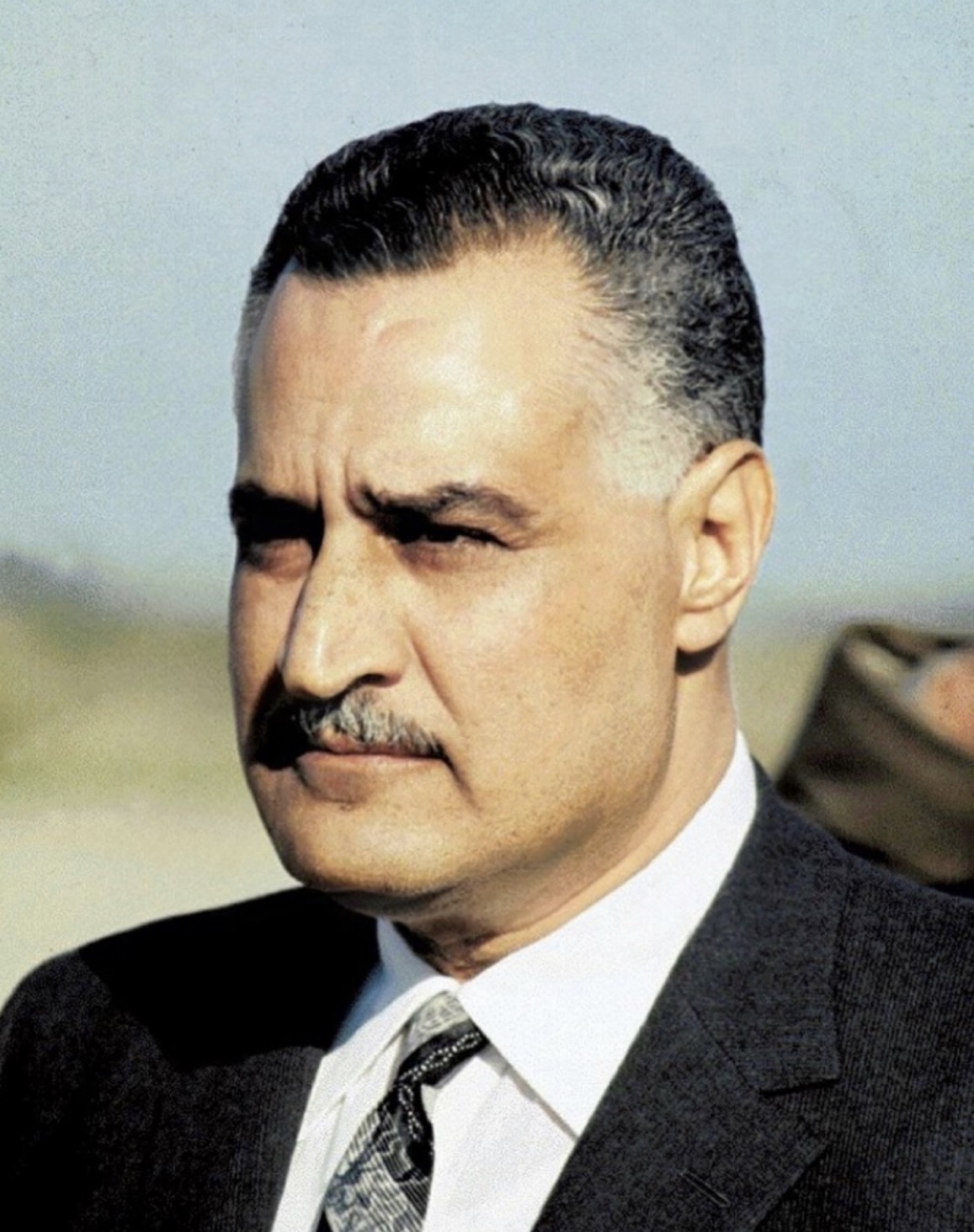
Gamal Abdel Nasser

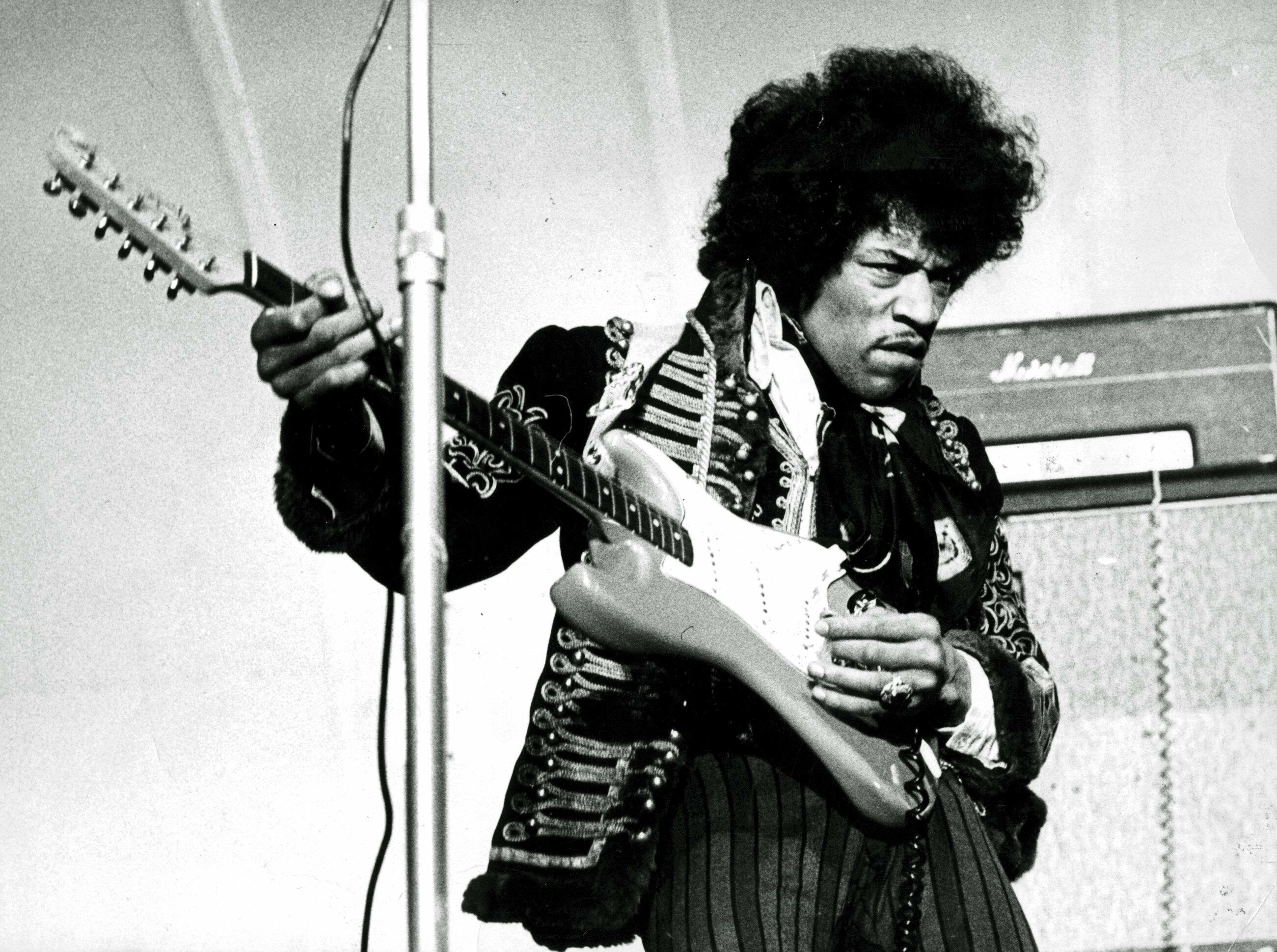
Jimi Hendrix

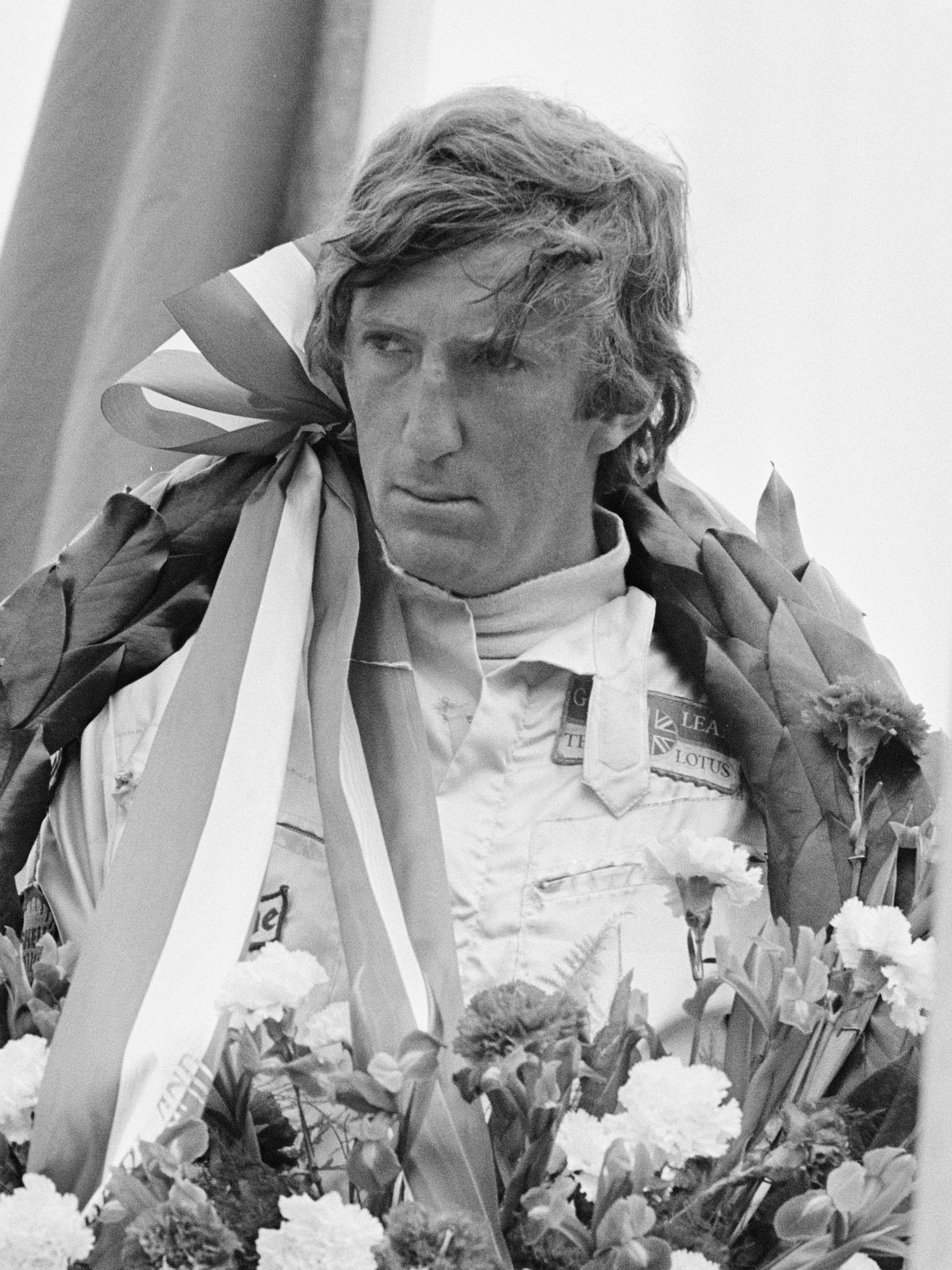
Jochen Rindt

- September 1 – François Mauriac, French writer, Nobel Prize laureate (b. 1885)
- September 2 – Marie-Pierre Kœnig, French general and politician (b. 1898)
- September 3
  - Vince Lombardi, American football player and coach (b. 1913)
  - Alan Wilson, American musician (Canned Heat) (b. 1943)
- September 5
  - Jesse Pennington, English footballer (b. 1883)
  - Jochen Rindt, Austrian racing driver, 1970 Formula One Driver's Champion (b. 1942)
- September 7 – Yitzhak Gruenbaum, leader of the Zionist movement in the interwar period (b. 1879)
- September 11 – Chester Morris, American actor (b. 1901)
- September 12 – Jacob Viner, Canadian economist (b. 1892)
- September 14 – Rudolf Carnap, German-born American philosopher and mathematician (b. 1891)
- September 18 – Jimi Hendrix, American rock musician (b. 1942)
- September 22
  - Alice Hamilton, the first woman appointed to the faculty of Harvard University (b. 1869)
  - Joe Hickey, American politician, jurist, governor and senator from Wyoming (b. 1911)
- September 23 – André Bourvil, French actor (b. 1917)
- September 25 – Erich Maria Remarque, German author (All Quiet on the Western Front) (b. 1898)
- September 28
  - John Dos Passos, American novelist (b. 1896)
  - Mahmud al-Muntasir, 1st Prime Minister of Libya (b. 1903)
  - Gamal Abdel Nasser, 31st Prime Minister of Egypt and 2nd President of Egypt (b. 1918)
- September 29 – Edward Everett Horton, American actor (b. 1886)
- September 30 – Benedetto Aloisi Masella, Italian Roman Catholic cardinal (b. 1875)

=== October ===
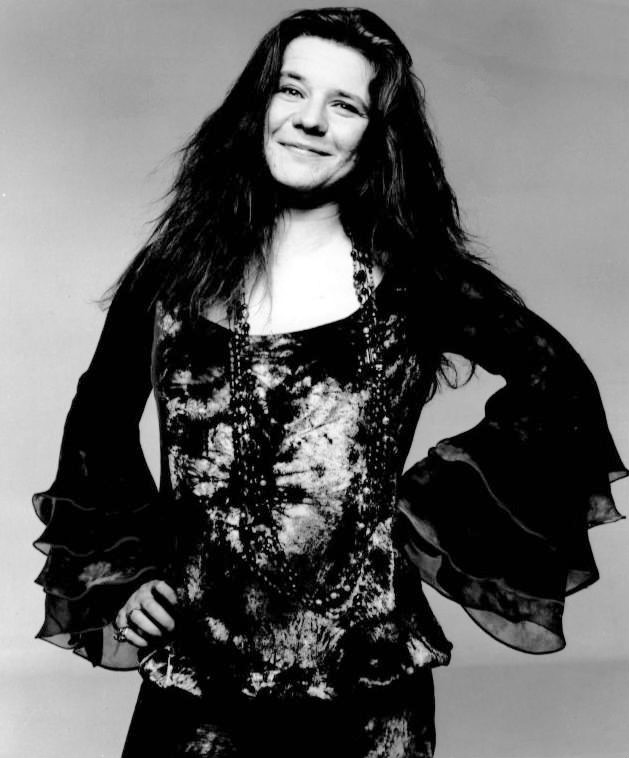
Janis Joplin

- October 1 – Petar Konjović, Yugoslav composer (b. 1883)
- October 4 – Janis Joplin, American rock singer (b. 1943)
- October 10 – Édouard Daladier, 72nd Prime Minister of France (b. 1884)
- October 12 – Feodor Stepanovich Rojankovsky, Russian illustrator (b. 1891)
- October 18 – Prince Zeid bin Hussein (b. 1898)
- October 19 – Lázaro Cárdenas, 44th President of Mexico (b. 1895)
- October 21
  - Li Linsi, Chinese educator and diplomat (b. 1896)
  - Ernest Haller, American cinematographer (b. 1896)
- October 24 – Richard Hofstadter, American historian (b. 1916)
- October 25 – René Schneider, commander-in-chief of the Chilean Army (b. 1913)
- October 29 – Mayme Ousley, American politician and the first female mayor in Missouri history (b. 1887)

=== November ===
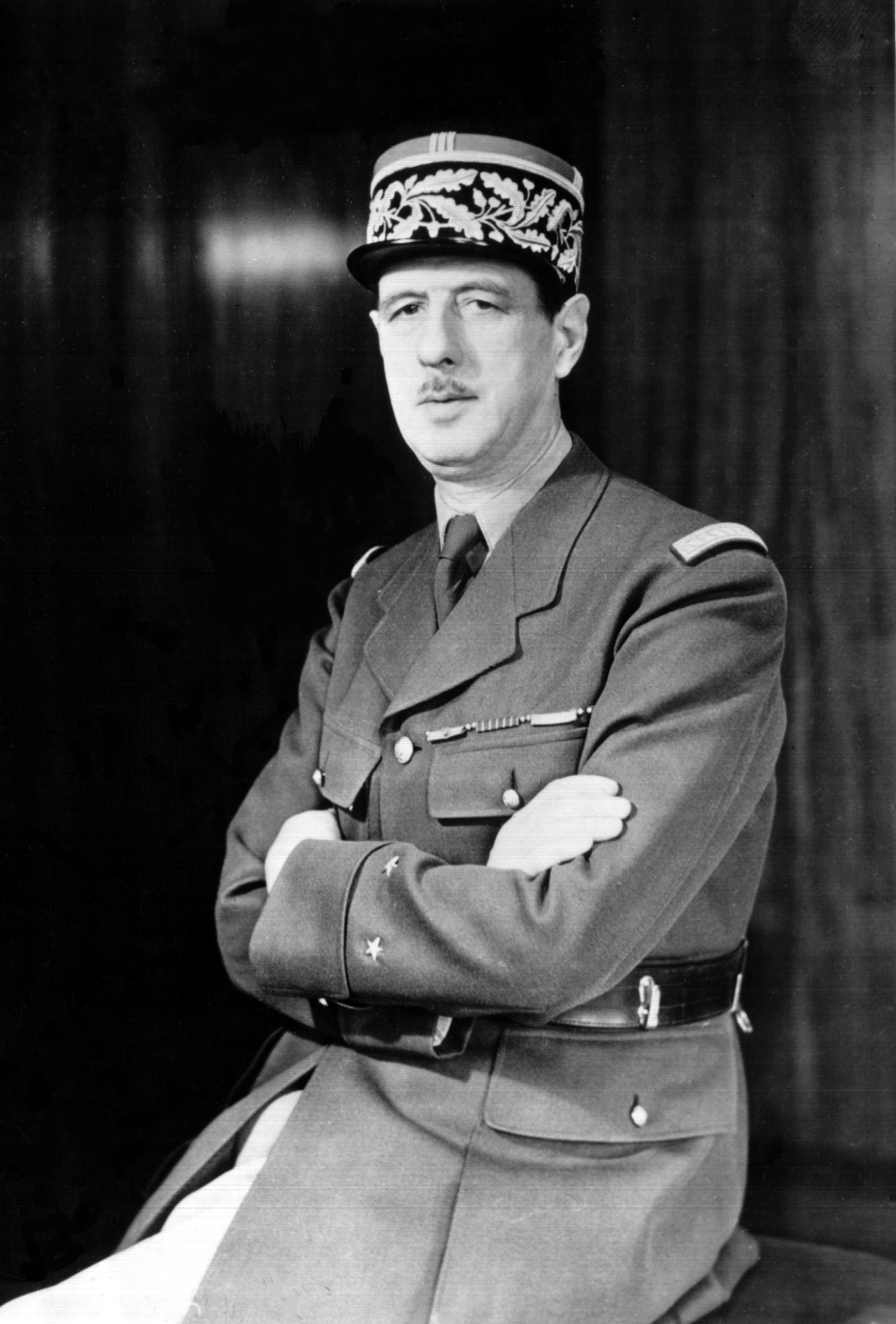
Charles de Gaulle

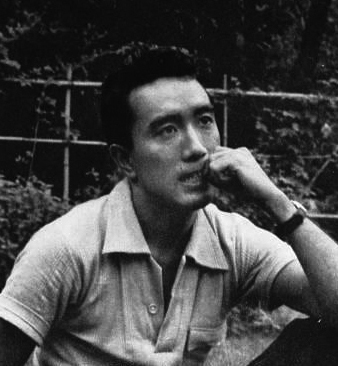
Yukio Mishima

- November 1 – Ivor Wynne (b. 1918)
- November 2
  - Abram Besicovitch, Russian mathematician (b. 1891)
  - Fernand Gravey, French actor (b. 1905)
- November 3 – Peter II of Yugoslavia (b. 1923)
- November 4 – Friedrich Kellner, German diarist (b. 1885)
- November 6 – Agustín Lara, Mexican composer (b. 1897)
- November 8 – Napoleon Hill, American author in the area of the new thought (b. 1883)
- November 9 – Charles de Gaulle, French general and statesman, 98th Prime Minister of France and 18th President of France (b. 1890)
- November 13
  - Bessie Braddock, British politician (b. 1899)
  - Hélène Sparrow, Polish-French medical doctor and bacteriologist (b. 1891)
- November 15 – Konstantinos Tsaldaris, Greek politician, 2-time Prime Minister of Greece (b. 1884)
- November 19
  - Andrei Yeremenko, Soviet military leader, Marshal of the Soviet Union (b. 1892)
  - Maria Yudina, Soviet pianist (b. 1899)
- November 21
  - C. V. Raman, Indian physicist (b. 1888)
  - Percy Ernst Schramm, German historian (b. 1894)
- November 23 – Yusof Ishak, Singaporean politician, 1st President of Singapore (b. 1910)
- November 24 – Tilly Devine, English-born Australian organised crime boss (b. 1900)
- November 25
  - Louise Glaum, American actress (b. 1888)
  - Yukio Mishima, Japanese novelist (b. 1925)

=== December ===
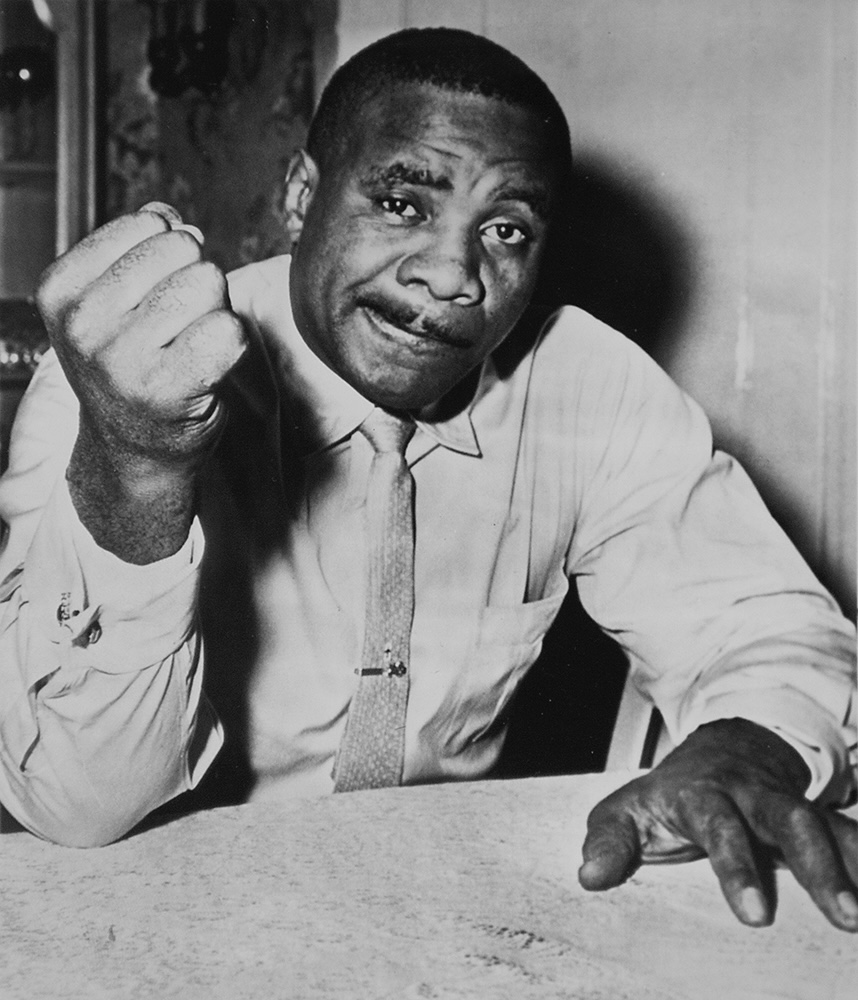
Sonny Liston

- December 7 – Rube Goldberg, American cartoonist (b. 1883)
- December 8 – Sir Christopher Kelk Ingold, British chemist (b. 1893)
- December 9 – Sir Feroz Khan Noon, 7th Prime Minister of Pakistan (b. 1893)
- December 10 – Chen Qiyou, chairman of the China Zhi Gong Party (b. 1892)
- December 14 – William Slim, 1st Viscount Slim, British field marshal and 13th Governor-General of Australia (b. 1891)
- December 15 – Sir Ernest Marsden, English-New Zealand physicist (b. 1889)
- December 16 – Friedrich Pollock, German social scientist and philosopher (b. 1894)
- December 23 – Charlie Ruggles, American actor (b. 1886)
- December 29 – Prince Adalbert of Bavaria (b. 1886)
- December 30
  - Sonny Liston, American boxer (b. c.1930)
  - Lenore Ulric, American actress (b. 1892)
- December 31 – Cyril Scott, English composer, writer and poet (b. 1879)

== Nobel Prizes ==

- Physics – Hannes Alfvén, Louis Néel
- Chemistry – Luis Federico Leloir
- Medicine – Sir Bernard Katz, Ulf von Euler, Julius Axelrod
- Literature – Aleksandr Solzhenitsyn
- Peace – Norman Borlaug
- Nobel Memorial Prize in Economic Sciences – Paul Samuelson
