= Bolivian literature =

Literature

The constant political turmoil that Bolivia has experienced throughout its history has slowed the development of Bolivian literature. Many talents have had to emigrate or were silenced by the internal conflict. In recent years the literature of Bolivia has been in a process of growth, with the appearance of new writers. Older writers such as Adela Zamudio, Oscar Alfaro, and Franz Tamayo continue to be important.

Nearly half of Bolivia's population speaks indigenous languages such as: Quechua, Aymara or Guarani. The indigenous peoples of Bolivia have a rich oral tradition, as expressed in myths, legends, and stories; these stories generally have not been transcribed in writing.

== Notable writers ==
Notable Bolivian writers include:

- Adela Zamudio
- Adolfo Costa du Rels
- Alcides Arguedas
- Alcira Cardona
- Antonio Díaz Villamil
- Armando Chirveches
- Armando Soriano Badani
- Augusto Céspedes
- Blanca Wiethüchter
- Carlos Medinaceli
- Edmundo Paz Soldán
- Eduardo Mitre
- Eduardo Scott
- Enrique Finot
- Fausto Reinaga
- Franz Tamayo
- Gabriel René Moreno
- Gary Daher Canedo
- Gastón Suárez
- Giovanna Rivero
- Gonzalo Lema
- Gustavo Adolfo Otero
- Gustavo Navarro
- Isabel Mesa de Inchauste
- Jaime Mendoza
- Jaime Sáenz
- Javier del Granado
- Jesús Lara Lara
- Juan Claudio Lechín
- Juan Pablo Piñeiro
- Juan Wallparrimachi
- Manuel Rigoberto Paredes
- María Josefa Mujia
- Natalia Palacios
- Nataniel Aguirre
- Oscar Cerruto
- Pedro Shimose
- Porfirio Diaz Machicao
- Ramón Rocha Monroy
- Renato Prada Oropeza
- Ricardo Jaimes Freyre
- Veronica Ormachea Gutierrez
- Victor Hugo Vizcarra
- Víctor Hugo Arévalo Jordán
- Víctor Montoya
- Óscar Alfaro

== The Bolivian Novel ==
In 2004, a book-length survey of the best Bolivian novels was published. It attempted to identify the top 10 novels in Bolivian literature, winnowing them down from a longer list of 91 novels. The study was done by Carlos Diego de Mesa Gisbert. Below is the list of top 30 novels as identified in the book.

1. Juan de la Rosa (1909) by Nataniel Aguirre
2. Raza de Bronce (1919) by Alcides Arguedas
3. La Chaskanawi (1947) by Carlos Medinaceli
4. Los deshabitados (1959) by Marcelo Quiroga
5. Aluvión de fuego (1935) by Oscar Cerruto
6. Metal del diablo (1946) by Augusto Cespedes
7. Matias el apostol suplente (1971) by Julio de la Vega
8. Manchay Puytu (1977) by Nestor Taboada Teran
9. Felipe Delgado (1979) by Jaime Saenz
10. Tierras hechizadas (1932) by Adolfo Costa du Reis
11. La candidatura de Rojas (1909) by Armando Chirveches
12. Tirinea (1969) by Jesus Urzagasti
13. Los fundadores del alba (1969) by Renato Prada Oropeza
14. En las tierras del Potosi (1911) by Jaime Mendoza
15. Yanakuna (1952) by Jesús Lara Lara
16. Socavones de angustia (1947) by Fernando Ramirez Velarde
17. Altiplano (1945) by Raul Botelho Gozalvez
18. La casa solariega (1916) by Armando Chirveches
19. La nina de sus ojos (1948) by Antonio Diaz Villamil
20. La sima fecunda (1933) by Augusto Guzman
21. Los Andes no creen en Dios (1973) by Adolfo Costa du Reis
22. Mallku (1974) by Gaston Suarez
23. El signo escalonado (1975) by Nestor Taboada Teran
24. Historia de la Villa Imperial (1736) by Bartolome Arzans
25. Su excelencia y su ilustrisima (1889) by Santiago Vaca Guzman
26. Paginas barbaras (1914) by Jaime Mendoza
27. Sangre de mestizos (1936) by Augusto Cespedes
28. Repete (1937) by Jesús Lara Lara
29. Prisionero de guerra (1938) by Augusto Guzman
30. Mateo Montemayor (1969) by Fernando Diez de Medina

== Bibliography ==
- Elizabeth Monasterios: "Chapter 42 La Paz- Chukiyawu Marka" in: Literary Cultures of Latin America. A comparative History, ed. by Mario J. Valdés and Djelal Kadir, Volume II: Institutional Modes and Cultural Modalities, Oxford: Oxford University Press, 2004, pp. 474–497
