= Del Granado =

Del Granado is a Spanish surname. Notable people with the surname include:

- Javier del Granado (1913–1996), Bolivian poet
- Juan del Granado (born 1953), Bolivian lawyer and politician
- Santiago Maria del Granado (1757–1823), Spanish physician
