= Gesta Bárbara =

Bolivian literary journal

Gesta Bárbara was a Bolivian literary journal that played an important role in Bolivian culture in the first half of the 20th century. It was established by Carlos Medinaceli in Potosí in 1918 (108 years ago). In its first iteration, the journal ran for ten issues. It then ceased publication and was revived many years later, in 1948 (78 years ago). The second run was managed by Gustavo Medinaceli and produced four issues before the magazine closed down permanently.

It is said to have been inspired by Ricardo Jaimes Freyre and his work Castalia Bárbara, and early meetings to set it up took place in the house of María Dolores de Inostrosa. The journal gave a platform to poets and critics who would go on to become important figures in Bolivian literature, among them: Armando Alba, Gamaliel Churata, Walter Dalence, Armando Palmero, María Medinaceli, Fidel Rivas, Enrique Viaña, Daniel Zambrana, Arturo Peralta, Víctor Valdivia, the cartoonist Rubinic de Vela, María Gutiérrez, Alberto Saavedra Nogales, Cecilio Guzmán de Rojas, Óscar Alfaro, Jacobo Libermann, Armando Soriano Badani, etc. Several anthologies, culled from the magazine's back issues, have been published in the decades since it closed.
