= Jesús Lara =

Jesús Lara may refer to:

- Jesús Alberto Lara (born 1994), Mexican footballer
- Jesús Lara Lara (1898–1980), Bolivian writer
