= Armando Soriano Badani =

Bolivian poet, writer, journalist and diplomat

- Born: 1923; Cochabamba, Bolivia
- Died: 2020 (aged 96–97)
- Education: Universidad Mayor de San Andrés (UMSA)
- Occupations: Poet, writer, journalist, diplomat

Armando Soriano Badani (1923–2020) was a Bolivian poet, writer, journalist and diplomat. He was born in Cochabamba, and studied at the Universidad Mayor de San Andrés (UMSA). He also pursued higher studies in Paris.

== Career ==
As a journalist, Badani ran the literary supplement of the newspaper Hoy and wrote for a variety of outlets, notably for Última Hora.

As a diplomat, he represented his country at the Organization of American States, and he was also posted to Paris as charge d'affaires. He held a number of important positions within Bolivia as a public servant.

He was a member of the Academia Boliviana de la Lengua from 1978. He was one of the last survivors of the cultural movement Gesta Bárbara founded by Carlos Medinaceli.

== Selected works ==
- Escondida en mis sueños (novel, 2004)
- Alba rota (poetry, 1969)
- Perfil del atardecer (poetry, 1976)
- Agonía de las viñas (poetry, 1985)
- Perennidad de los ensueños (poetry, 1991)
- La huella transparente (poetry, 1997)
- Rebelión de los anhelos (poetry, 1997)
- Caleidoscopio (poetry, 2000)
- Fuego incesante (poetry, 2002)
- Lumbre de invierno (poetry, 2005)
- El cuento boliviano (anthology, 2 vols, 1964–1969)
- Antología del cuento boliviano (anthology, 1975)
- El Illimani en la literatura (anthology, 1976)
- Poesía boliviana (anthology, 1977)
- Pintores bolivianos contemporáneos (essays, 1994)
- Ensayos sobre cultura boliviana (essays, 2007)
- Rumbo a la fatalidad (stories, 1989)
- Visiones de vida (stories, 1998)
- Unos pasos por el cielo (stories, 2003)
