= National Book Awards (disambiguation) =

The National Book Awards are a set of United States literary prizes.

National Book Awards may also refer to:

- National Novel Award (Bolivia)
- National Book Awards (Philippines)
- National Business Book Award, Canada
- British Book Awards
- National Outdoor Book Award, United States
