= National Novel Award (Bolivia) =

- Sponsored by: Alfaguara
- Country: Bolivia
- First award: 1998

The National Novel Award (Premio Nacional de Novela) is one of the main literary awards given annually in Bolivia. It is convened by the Ministry of Cultures, and originally sponsored by Grupo Santillana, through the Alfaguara publishing house. It was established in 1998 to promote the dissemination of Bolivian literature in the novel genre and better awareness of its authors.

All persons of Bolivian nationality who reside in the country, excluding authors awarded the previous two years, authorities, public officials, and Santillana employees, can qualify for the award. A jury composed of prominent members of the Bolivian and international literary and cultural world selects the winner.

In practice, it replaced the Erich Guttentag Award, which was organized by Los Amigos del Libro publishing house. Honorable mentions have been granted in some years.

In 2012, the prize was 89,300 bolivianos (US$12,923). Of the total sum, the Ministry of Cultures contributed 22,800 Bs., the Embassy of Spain 21,000, Banco Sol 21,000, BBA Previsión AFP 10,500, Red ATB 7,000, and Grupo Santilllana with the same amount.

== Winners ==
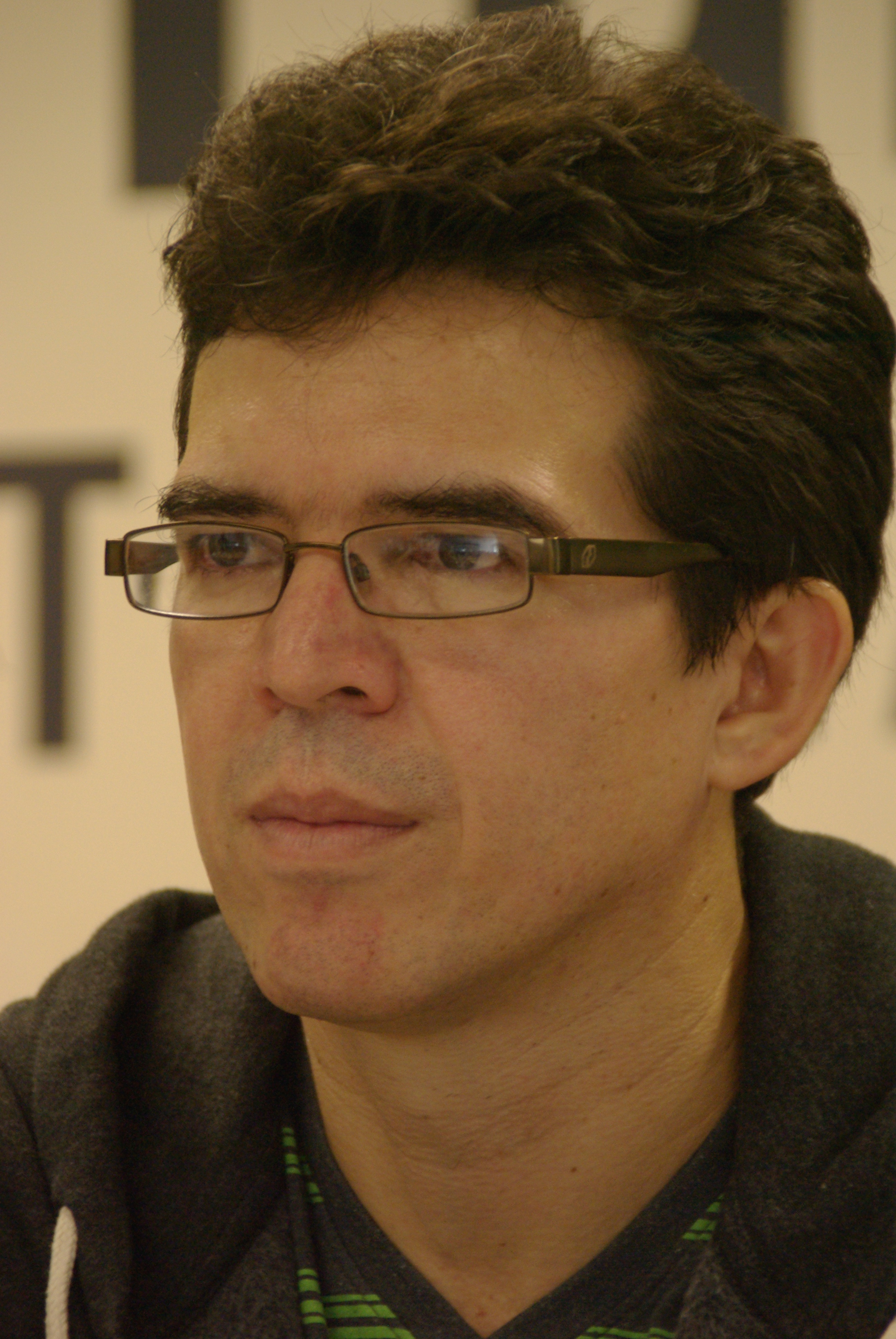
Edmundo Paz Soldán, winner in 2003

List of winners of the National Novel Award
Year	Novel	Author	Department
1999	La vida me duele sin vos	Gonzalo Lema	Tarija
2000	Alguien más a cargo	Cé Mendizábal	Oruro
2001	Magdalena en el Paraíso	Tito Gutiérrez Vargas	Cochabamba
2002	Potosí 1600	Ramón Rocha Monroy	Cochabamba
2003	El delirio de Turing	Edmundo Paz Soldán	Cochabamba
2004	La gula del picaflor	Juan Claudio Lechín	Cochabamba
2005	La doncella del barón Cementerio	Eduardo Scott-Moreno	Cochabamba
2006	El agorero de sal	Luisa Fernanda Siles	La Paz
2007	Fantasmas asesinos	Wilmer Urrelo	La Paz
2008	La toma del manuscrito	Sebastián Antezana	Mexico-La Paz
2009	He de morir de cosas así	Eduardo Scott-Moreno	Cochabamba
2010	La noche como un ala	Máximo Pacheco Balanza	Chuquisaca
2011	Diario secreto	Claudio Ferrufino-Coqueugniot	Cochabamba
2012	En el fondo tu ausencia	Rosario Barahona	Chuquisaca
2013	Pasado por sal	Cé Mendizábal	Oruro
2014	El sonido de la H	Magela Baudoin	Venezuela-Santa Cruz
2015	La Guerra del Papel	Oswaldo Calatayud	La Paz
2017	Soundtrack; glosario de términos relacionados	Camila Urioste	La Paz
2018	Días detenidos	Guillermo Augusto Ruiz Plaza	La Paz

List of Honorable Mentions
Year	Novel	Author	Department
1999	Altiplano Express	Juan de Recacoechea	La Paz
2000	Huesos y cenizas	Máximo Pacheco Balanza	Chuquisaca
2003	Periférica Blvd.	Adolfo Cárdenas Franco	La Paz
2006	Retrato de ciudad con calavera en mano	Máximo Pacheco Balanza	Chuquisaca
2007	Los ingenuos	Verónica Ormachea Gutiérrez	La Paz
2007	Mundo puto	Roberto Cuevas	La Paz
2008	La virgen de los deseos	Néstor Taboada Terán	La Paz
2010	Lluvia de piedra	Rodrigo Urquiola Flores	La Paz
2017	La ceguera del jaguar	Rodrigo Urquiola Flores	La Paz

== See also ==
- Yolanda Bedregal National Poetry Award
