= Oruro Symphony Orchestra =

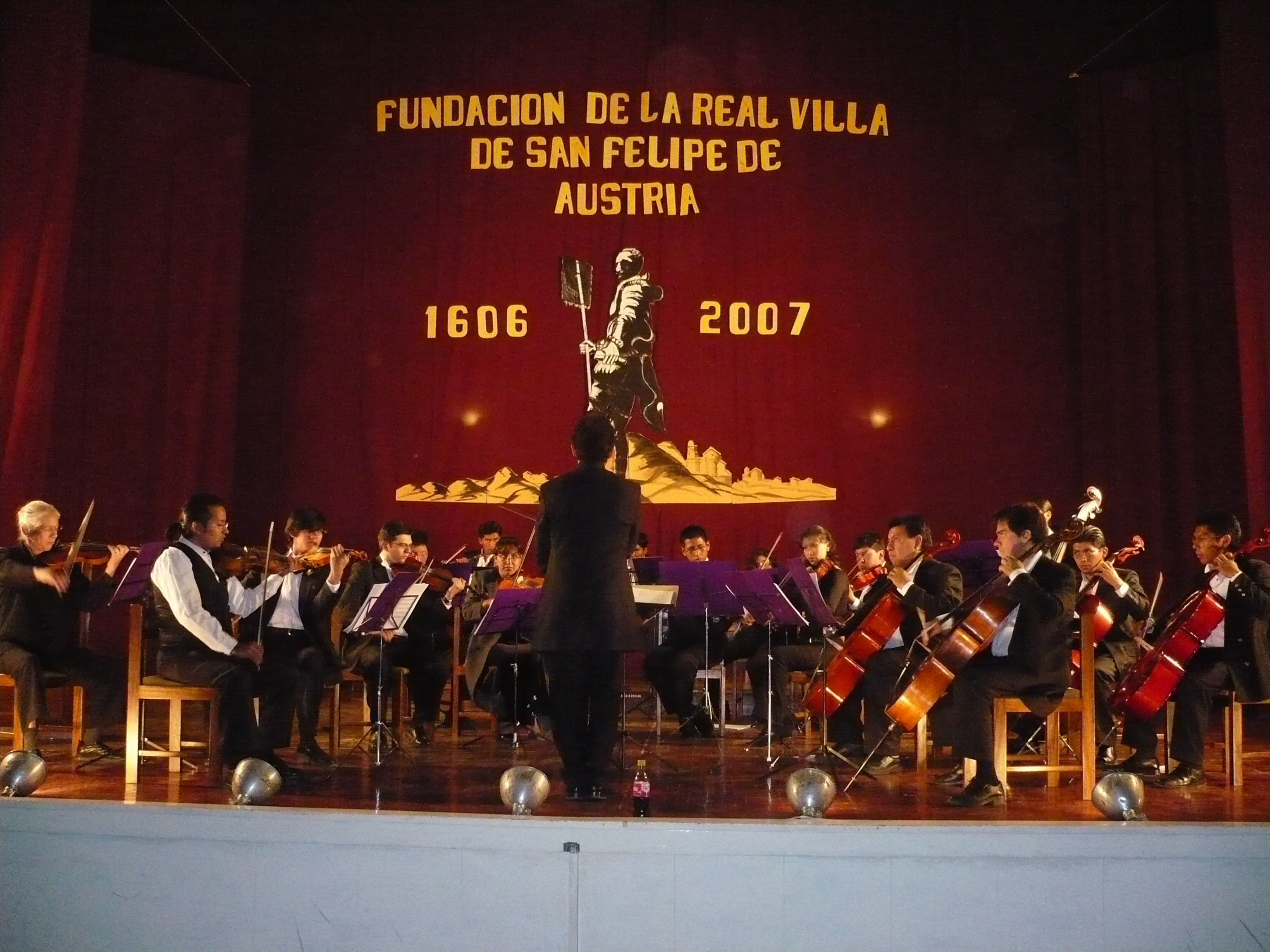
The Orquesta Sinfónica de Oruro in 2007.

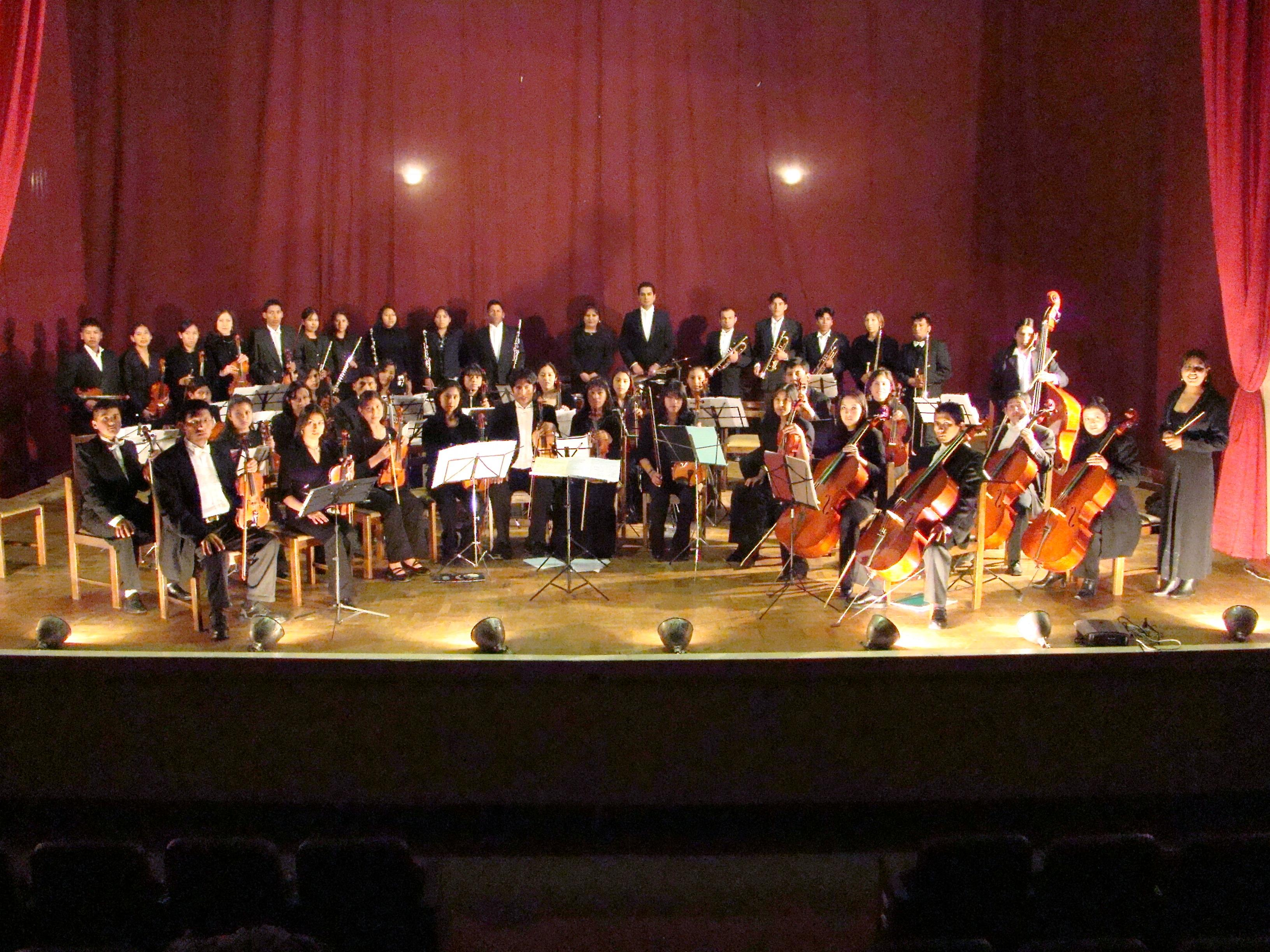
The Youth Symphony Orchestra of Oruro in 2007

The Oruro Symphony Orchestra (Spanish: Orquesta Sinfónica de Oruro) is a symphony orchestra based in Oruro, Bolivia. Under the directorship of Jesús Elías (2006–2008), they perform at the Teatro de la Casa Municipal de Cultura in Oruro.

== Background and history ==
Following the foundation of the Conservatorio Nacional de Música in La Paz in 1907, a strong insurgency for musical movements in the main cities of Bolivia originated. In Oruro, the teacher Pedro Rodriguez Santa Cruz in 1914, became the first director to conform an orchestra. Nevertheless, it was not until 1921 that the city saw the orchestra established in Oruro, directed by the violin teacher Linen Cañipa Ferreira, being reorganized in October 1930 by the Italian teacher Franco Russo. Amongst the orchestra members were acclaimed musicians such as Adrián Patiño Carpio, Franz Walk, Francisco Molo, Adolph Hirschmann, the Forns Samsó brothers, the French cellist Ginet Rougeot, the French violinists Mathilde Heimberg and Lydia Bernardini, Abel Elías and others.

=== Reformation ===
On August 19, 2006, the orchestra was refunded by a merger of classical musicians from the Ensemble Ad Libitvm, the Camacho of Oruro and the Camerata Concertante of Cochabamba. Jesús Elías became the director of the orchestra, and cellist Miguel Salazar, the violinists Jose Durán, Marcela Tórrez, and others joined its ranks.

The Symphonic Choir of Oruro was also formed under the directorship of Jesus Elías. Later, in December 2006, the Youthful Symphony orchestra of Oruro was founded under the directorship of the prestigious teacher Marcela Tórrez Sahonero.

== Orchestra directors ==
- 1921-1925 - Lino Cañipa Ferreira
- 1925-1930 - Miguel Bascopé
- 1930-1933 - Franco Russo
- 1940-1947 - Manuel Vidal

- 1952-1958 - José Cosío Maldonado
- 1962-1974 - Severo Durán
- 2006-2007 - Augusto Guzmán
- 2006-2008 - Jesús Elías

== Oruro Symphony Orchestra 2006-2008 ==
- Directors: Augusto Guzmán, Jesús Elías
- Violins I: José Durán, Marcela Tórrez, Christina Peláez, Patricia Flores, Flavio Mejía, Catherine Goumoens, Antonio Tórrez, Alejandra Zapata.
- Violins II: Pablo Villarroel, Antonio Tórrez, Sergio López, Cintya Bejarano, Andrea Zapata, Paola Sotelo, Paola Elías.
- Viola: Ramiro Jiménez, Rodolfo Elías, Fernanda Urrea, Daniel Fernández, Jessica Viscarra, Adriana López, Pedro Pérez.
- Cellos: Miguel Salazar, Ariana Stambuck, Jesús Elías, Richard Tórrez, Adriana Viscarra, Nohelia Cuellar, Gloria Soto.
- Double Bass: Raúl Jiménez, Franz Pontes.
- Flutes: Jorge Callejas, Oscar Elías Siles.
- Clarinets: José Luis Marin, Christian Choque, Isidro Quispe, Alvaro Quispe
- Oboes: Gabriela Claure, Walter Colque
- Trumpets: Iván Ticona, Henry Valda, Wellington Façanha, Grover Flores
- Trombone: Juan Carlos Condori, Saturnino Flores.
- Percussion: Freddy Quispe, Isidro Quispe.
