= Jesús Elías =

Oscar Jesús Elías Lucero
- Born: 1 December 1977 (age 48); Oruro, Bolivia
- Occupations: Cellist, composer, conductor
- Instruments: Cello, Viola, Guitar
- Years active: 1990s–present

Oscar Jesús Elías Lucero (born 1 December 1977) is a Bolivian cellist, classical guitarist, composer and conductor. He is the director of the Oruro Symphony Orchestra (2006–2008). His musical style is a combination of classical music and traditional Bolivian folk music.

== Biography ==
Elías was born in the city of Oruro, Bolivia in 1977. The son of a noted musical teacher Oscar Elías Síles, he went on to study classic harmony of the Italo-Bolivian composer Edgar Alandia and musical conducting and directing under Freddy Terrazas. He was a member of the Departmental Committee of Ethnography and Folklore of Oruro and of the Society of Geography and History of Oruro, all of which gave him important knowledge in traditional folk music. He then studied colonial music of the Altiplano region, and created transcriptions of Oruro baroque music. He was then a member of the group Conjunto Típico Sajama, and then director of the baroque classical group, the Ensemble Ad Libitvm.

On December 8, 2004, he was the founding member of the Scuola Cantorum Oruro, a choir with pianist Marcela Tórrez. On 19 August 2006, he became director of the Oruro Symphony Orchestra, next to Augusto Guzmán, a prestigious director from Cochabamba.

== Works ==
- 20 Estudios -for guitar (1997)
- Tres Fantasías for Cello and Piano (1998)
- "10 cuecas" 2001, "Anatas y fiestas" for piano (2002)
- "Ave María" a la Virgen del Socavón (2006)
- "Oruro" Concerte for piano and orchestra (2006)
- "Tres llantos lunares" for violin and guitar (2006) ("La Luna y el Argonauta", "Plenyluna", "Octubre Negro")
- Suite "El Huayna" (2007)
- Missa "Oruro" (2007)
