= National Novel Award =

National Novel Award may refer to:

- National Novel Award (Bolivia)
- National Novel Award (Colombia)
