= Adela Zamudio =

Bolivian poet, feminist, and educator (1854–1928)

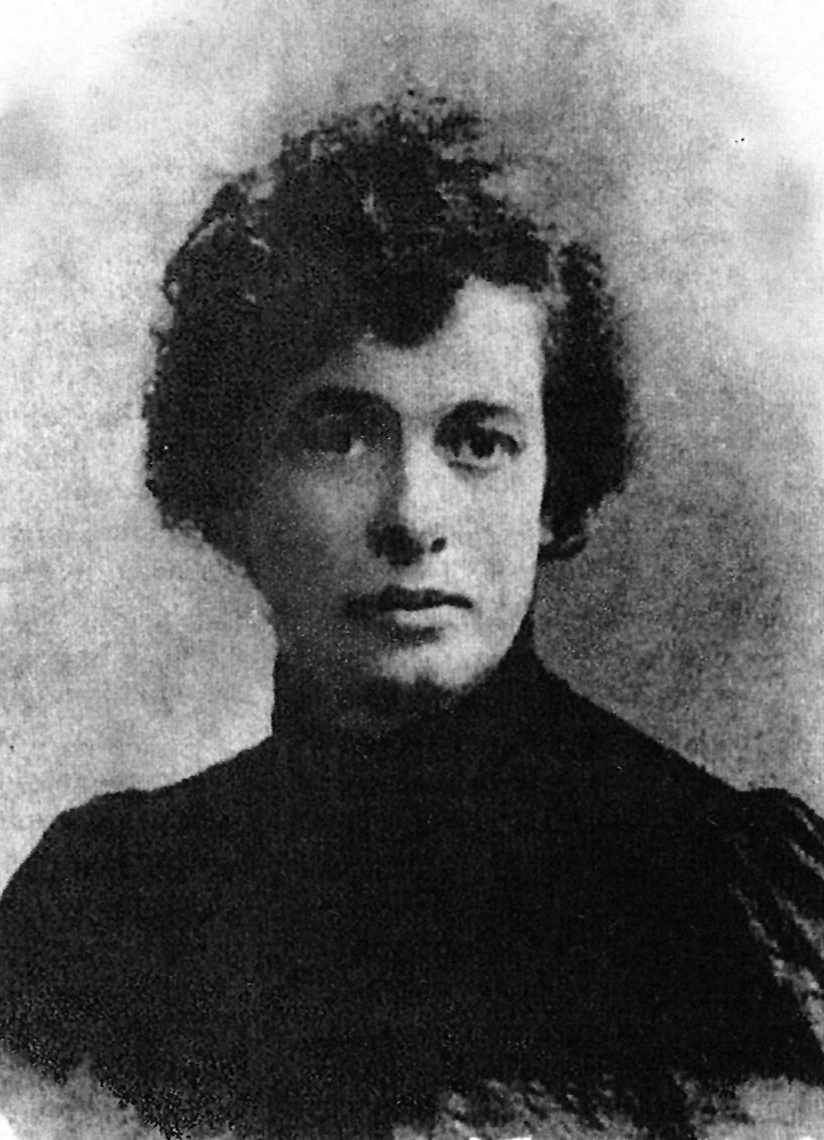
- Adela Zamudio
- Born: Paz Juana Plácida Adela Rafaela Zamudio Rivero; 11 October 1854; Cochabamba, Bolivia
- Died: 2 June 1928 (aged 73); Cochabamba, Bolivia
- Other name: Soledad
- Occupations: Poet, novelist, short story writer, essayist, teacher, activist
- Known for: Bolivia's most famous poet, founder of the Bolivian feminist movement.

Paz Juana Plácida Adela Rafaela Zamudio Rivero (11 October 1854 – 2 June 1928) was a Bolivian poet, feminist, and educator. She is considered the most famous Bolivian poet, and is credited with founding the country's feminist movement. In her writing, she also used the pen-name Soledad. Adela Zamudio's birthday, 11 October, is a national holiday in Bolivia to honor all working women.

== Early life ==
Adela Zamudio was born in Cochabamba, Bolivia, in 1854, to upper-class parents. Her father, Don Adolfo Zamudio, was an engineer of Basque ancestry who had emigrated to Bolivia from Argentina. Her mother, Doña Modesta Rivero de Zamudio, was the daughter of a wealthy La Paz mine owner, José Claudio Rivero, who employed Adolfo. Zamudio was first taught by a Londoner, Elizabeth Gové, who ran a small school in Coro Coro. After Zamudio's maternal grandfather, José Claudio Rivero died, and her father Adolfo Zamudio lost his job at Rivero's copper mines, the family's economic situation quickly fell. Zamudio attended the public elementary school El Beaterio de San Alberto for two years (a charity school for orphans, Indigenous children, and poor whites such as herself). Her formal education stopped in the third grade, as was the policy for girls. Zamudio was also tutored by her parents, a London English tutor (before her wealthy grandfather died), and was self taught, reading great quantities of literature, including feminist works.

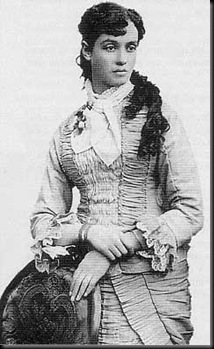
Zamudio in the 1870s

== Career ==
Zamudio published her first poem, Two Roses, when she was 15, but did not publish her first book until 20 years later.

In 1926 she was awarded the Bolivian Crown of Distinction award. Zamudio's first book of poetry was published in Buenos Aires in 1887. The next year, the La Paz Literary Circle named her an honorary member, along with Manuela Gorriti de Belzu. Over the next several years, Zamudio began painting, wrote and directed theatrical productions, published the humorist newspaper El alegre carneval (The Happy Carnival), and continued to write and publish major works. She used a pseudonym, Soledad (Solitude), to reflect her often lonely and misunderstood self, who sought to escape conservative Bolivian society.

In 1899, Zamudio began her teaching career at El Beaterio de San Alberto (where she had attended public school) as an art teacher. In 1901, she founded a women's art academy where she taught painting and drawing. In 1905, she became the principal of a new school for young women, the Escuala Fiscal de Señoritas (Public School for Young Women), which began women's education past adolescence in Bolivia. Zamudio further contributed to educational methodology by writing and publishing pedagogical materials about critical teaching skills. Zamudio went on to found Bolivia's first school of painting for women, Ávila, in 1911.

Zamudio conducted literary campaigns in mining communities, where rich mine owners (like her own grandfather had been) kept indigenous miners and their families illiterate. Her biographer Taborga de Villarroel credits this work with contributing the solidarity that helped them in future insurrections and with training the next generation of great Bolivian thinkers.

In 1912, Zamudio's sister Amalia died, and Zamudio stepped in to take care of her children.

In 1913, Zamudio was awarded with a gold pen by Bolivia's leading intellectuals in honor of her essays, which sparked national discourse regarding the moral failings of the local Bishop and Catholic Church. She also published her poetry collection Ráfagas in Paris, and her only novel, Íntimas.

Zamudio's writings critiquing World War I gained popularity and were published multiple times.

Her 1914 allegorical story "La reunión de ayer / Yesterday's Meeting" was very popular and published many times. Her animal trope to critique society was later used by George Orwell in Animal Farm (1945).

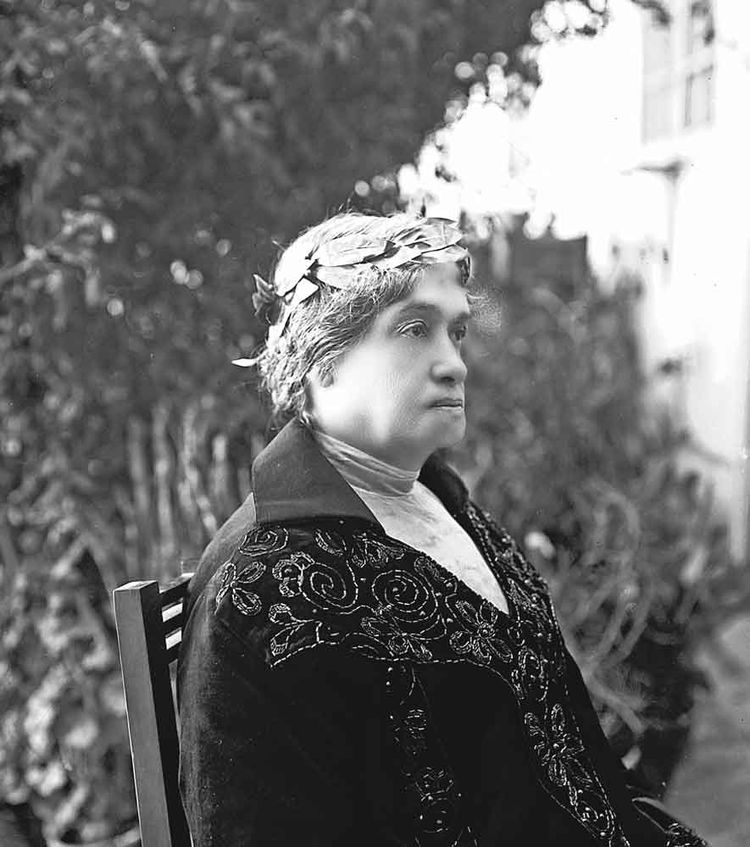
Zamudio crowned in gold laurels at the 1926 ceremony in her honor.

In 1920, Zamudio's call for girls' education was answered with the opening of the first public high school for women, which was later named Liceo Adela Zamudio. Zamudio was appointed principal, and continued teaching, training teachers, and promoting women's communities until she was forced to retire in 1925. In 1926, the president of Bolivia crowned Zamudio with gold laurel leaves to honor her as a thinker in a large ceremony.

Zamudio died on 2 June 1928, in Cochabamba.

== Activism ==
Throughout her teaching career, Zamudio conducted literary campaigns in Quechua-speaking mining communities, where rich mine owners (like her own grandfather had been) kept indigenous miners and their families illiterate. Her biographer and grand-niece Gabriela Taborga de Villarroel credits this work with contributing the solidarity that helped them in future insurrections and with training the next generation of great Bolivian thinkers.

Her poetry and fiction dealt primarily with the social struggles of Bolivia, often with a romantic feeling invoked towards revolution. Non-religious, her writing was highly intellectual. Her work Quo Vadis, caused a stir amongst upper-class women and clerics, increasing animosity towards her work. Her struggles with religion caused her to choose to no longer teach religion at the school she directed and the League of Catholic Women publicly condemned her.

Zamudio also wrote articles for publications and newspapers, promoting democratic reforms and women's rights, including the legalization of divorce.

== Legacy ==
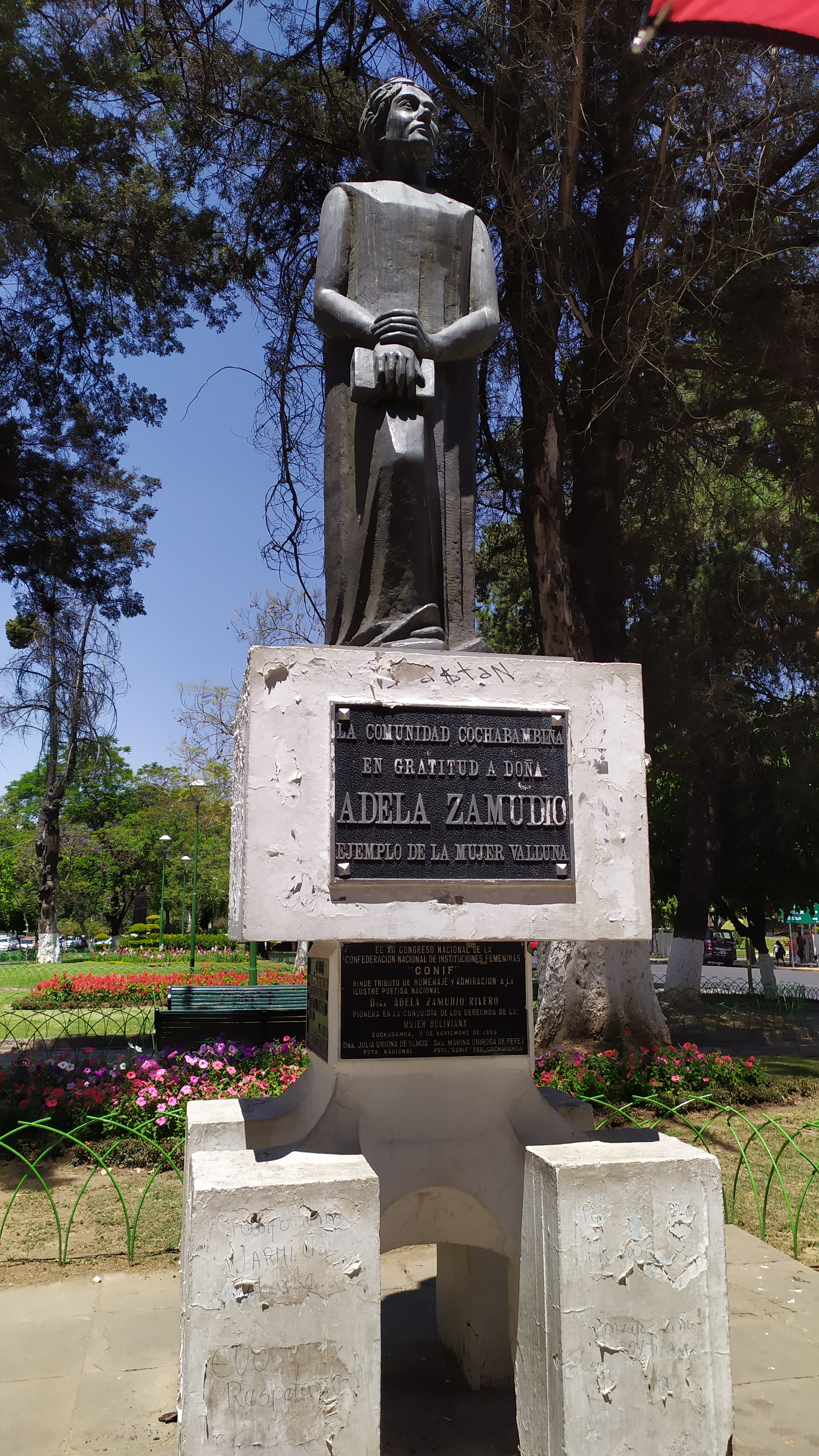
Statue of Adela Zamudio in Cochabamba.

Zamudio's family republished her poetry in 1942. In 1955, Augusto Guzman wrote the first biography about Zamudio. In 1977, Zamudio's grand-niece, Gabriela Taborga de Villarroel published another, La verdadera Adela Zamudio, which focuses more on her life using archival and family materials. In 2018, Virginia Ayllón published a more critical book El pensamiento de Adela Zamudio, which aimed to dispel misinformation within the popular understanding about Zamudio. While there is academic analysis of Zamudio's impact, it had been mostly in Spanish and circulated in Bolivia, until Lynette Yetter's 2020 Reed College Master's thesis, Domination and Justice in the Allegorical Story "La reunión de ayer" by Adela Zamudio (1854-1928), Bolivia.

The first book to bring Zamudio's life and work to the English-speaking world (and the Spanish-speaking world outside of Bolivia) is the 2023 PEN Award for Poetry in Translation finalist Adela Zamudio: Selected Poetry & Prose, translated from the Spanish by Lynette Yetter, bilingual edition (Fuente Fountain Books 2022). Adela Zamudio: Selected Poetry & Prose earned a Kirkus Starred review and was a BookLife for Publishers Weekly Editor's Pick.

On 2 November 1989, the Confederación de Instituciones Femeninas ("CONIF") erected a statue in honor of Zamudio in Chochabamba.

A plaza in the Sopocachi neighborhood of La Paz was named for Adela Zamudio, and her granite bust by sculptor Vítor Zapana was placed in the center of Plaza Adela Zamudio in 1979.

In 1980, Bolivia's first female president, Lidia Gueiler, declared Zamudio's birthday, 11 October, a national holiday. It is celebrated in Bolivia as the "Day of Bolivian Women."

In 1994, a crater on Venus was named Zamudio in honor of Adela Zamudio. Zamudio is also the namesake of an ant, Hylomyrma adelae.

Zamudio is a featured figure on Judy Chicago's installation piece The Dinner Party, being represented as one of the 999 names on the Heritage Floor. She is in the place setting dedicated to Virginia Woolf.

== Works ==
- Ensayos poéticos (Poetic Texts) (1887)
- Violeta o la princesa azul (Violeta or the Blue Princess) (1890)
- El castillo negro (The Black Castle) (1906)
- Intimas (Close Friends) (1913)
- Ráfagas (Squalls) (1914)
- Peregrinando (Travelling) (1943)
- Cuentos breves (Short Novels) (1943)
- Adela Zamudio: Selected Poetry & Prose, translated from the Spanish by Lynette Yetter, bilingual edition (Fuente Fountain Books 2022) (2023 PEN Award for Poetry in Translation, finalist)
