= José Aguirre de Achá =

Bolivian writer, politician, diplomat, and lawyer

José María Aguirre de Achá (24 March 1877 – 23 April 1941) was a Bolivian writer, politician and lawyer from Cochabamba. He was active as a lawyer during the 1898 revolution and later served as Minister of Education. He was also a diplomat to Colombia, Venezuela and Ecuador.

Aguirre was the son of Nataniel Aguirre and Margarita de Achá, daughter of Bolivian president José María de Achá.

== Works ==
- Platonía; la zona de arbitraje en el litigio boliviano-paraguayo.
- La antigua provincia de Chiquitos.

== References and sources ==
Sources

- Álvarez del Real, María Eloísa (1991). 12.000 minibiografías. Panamá: América, S.A. p. 18. ISBN 0-944499-76-7.
