= Armando Chirveches =

Bolivian writer

- Born: 1881; La Paz, Bolivia
- Died: 1926 (aged 44–45); Paris, France
- Occupation: Writer
- Notable work: Celeste (1905), La candidatura de Rojas (1908), La casa solariega (1916), La virgen del lago (1920)

Armando Chirveches (1881–1926) was a Bolivian writer.

He is known for novels such as Celeste (1905), La candidatura de Rojas (1908), La casa solariega (1916), La virgen del lago (1920), etc. Much of his work was published reissued recently by the Biblioteca del Bicentenario de Bolivia under the title Obra Reunida. La candidatura de Rojas and La casa solariega are considered by critics to be among the best novels in Bolivian literature.

He lived abroad for much of his life, and killed himself in Paris in 1926.
