= Nataniel Aguirre =

Bolivian lawyer, diplomat, politician (1843–1888)

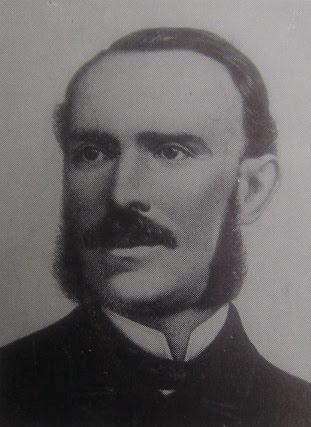
- Born: Nataniel Aguirre González (sometimes his second surname is represented as: González-Prada or González de Prada); October 10, 1843; Cochabamba, Bolivia
- Died: September 11, 1888 (aged 44); Montevideo, Uruguay
- Occupations: Writer, politician, diplomat, lawyer
- Spouse: Margarita Achá
- Children: 9
- Relatives: Miguel María de Aguirre (Father); María Manuela González de Prada (Mother)
- Writing career
- Genre: Novel
- Notable work: Juan de la Rosa

Nataniel Aguirre (Cochabamba, Bolivia, October 10, 1843 – Montevideo, Uruguay, September 11, 1888), was a Bolivian lawyer, diplomat, politician, writer, and historian. Menéndez y Pelayo considers his novel Juan de la Rosa the best 19th century novel in Spanish America.

== Early life ==
Born in the Hacienda de Huayllani, in the department of Cochabamba, the fourth of five children, he was the son of the financier and Bolivian politician Miguel María de Aguirre and María Manuela González de Prada, who died when he was only three years old.

He finished high school in Sucre in 1857 and shortly afterwards met Margarita de Achá, daughter of the president José María de Achá. Aguirre adored her and dedicated a poem to her, and married her on March 30, 1864, after graduating law school. They had nine children, one of which, José, also became a writer and politician.

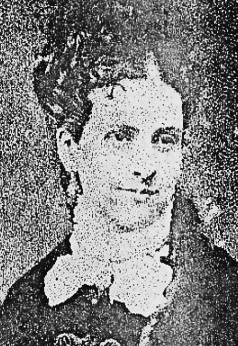
Margarita de Achá, Aguirre's wife

== Studies and politics ==
Aguirre studied law at the Universidad Mayor de San Simón, graduating in 1864. When he was a student; in 1862 he founded El Independiente, where he wrote for one column.

In 1864 he was named secretary of the Bolivian Delegation in Lima. The González Prada family, relatives of Aguirre on his mother's side, introduced him to intellectual and political circles in Peru.

That year he wrote a play called Visionarios y mártires, about two characters, the Peruvian patriots Manuel Ubalde and Gabriel Aguilar, who in 1805 had conceived in Cuzco the idea of independence of the homeland.

The following year he returned to Bolivia to contribute to the forces of his father-in-law, who had been overthrown by the military coup of Mariano Melgarejo.

After the violent death of the dictator Agustín Morales, he participated in the Constituent Assembly of 1871, and joined in the debates between the unitarians, the encabezados led by Evaristo del Valle, and the federalists of Lucas Mendoza de la Tapia; after some hesitation, the tendency that appeared most just to Aguirre, were the ideas of the liberals. He was the representative for Chapare Province (whose 1872 constitution he helped write), member of the President's Council of State Tomás Frías (1872), and prefect of Cochabamba (1879). In 1879 he left for the War of the Pacific and led the squadron Vanguardia. He directed the Convention of 1880, which ratified Narciso Campero as the constitutional president. He was named first Minister of War and then Minister of Foreign Relations. In this position he negotiated in 1884 the Pact of Truce between Bolivia and Chile of 1884 with Chile even though he was personally in favor of continuing the war.

He defended the necessity of a large agrarian reform and supported the indigenous people. He once said: “Hagamos del pobre indio un ciudadano como nosotros” (We will make the poor Indian a citizen like us). In 1885, the same year of the foundation of the Liberal Party, he was made the leader for it in Cochabamba.

== Literature ==
Member of the Generación de 1880, among whose works stood out were Represalia del Héroe, Biografía de Francisco Burdett O'Connor, Bolivia en la Guerra del Pacífico and the novel that was made famous, Juan de la Rosa. This novel —originally published with the title Cochabamba. Memoirs of the Last Soldier of the Independence Movement and whose authorship was doubted—, is, according to critics and experts, one of the fundamentals of Bolivian literature. He also wrote plays and poems.

== Later life ==
He died in Montevideo, on the way to Brazil, where the government of Gregorio Pacheco had sent him as plenipotentiary minister to the court of Pedro II. His remains were repatriated to Cochabamba, where they are buried now in the mausoleum of the public cemetery.

== Works ==
- Visionarios y mártires (1864), play, about the Peruvian patriots Manuel Ubalde and Gabriel Aguilar
- Represalia de un héroe (1868), play, about the patriot Nicolás Bravo, a piece based on an event in the independence movement in Mexico that occurred in Oaxaca in 1812
- El general Francisco Burdett O'Connor (1874), about an Irishman who arrived with the armies of Sucre and remained in Bolivia; Imprenta de la Unión Americana, La Paz (unfinished)
- Unitarismo y federalismo (1877), Imprenta del Siglo, Cochabamba
- Bolivia en la Guerra del Pacífico (1882–83), Imprenta de El Heraldo, Cochabamba (unfinished)
- El Libertador: comprendio histórico de la vida de Simón Bolívar (1883), Imprenta de El Heraldo, Cochabamba (unfinished)
- La bellísima Floriana (1886), novel
- Don Ego, short story
- Cochabamba. Memorias del último soldado de la independencia, novel, published in 1884 in installments by the newspaper El Heraldo under the pseudonym of Juan de la Rosa and whose printing press released the first edition in book the following year
- Juan de la Rosa. Memorias del último soldado de la independencia, second edition of the novel made by the bookshop of Vda. de C. Bouret, México/París, 1909, already with the authority of Aguirre
