= Renato Prada Oropeza =

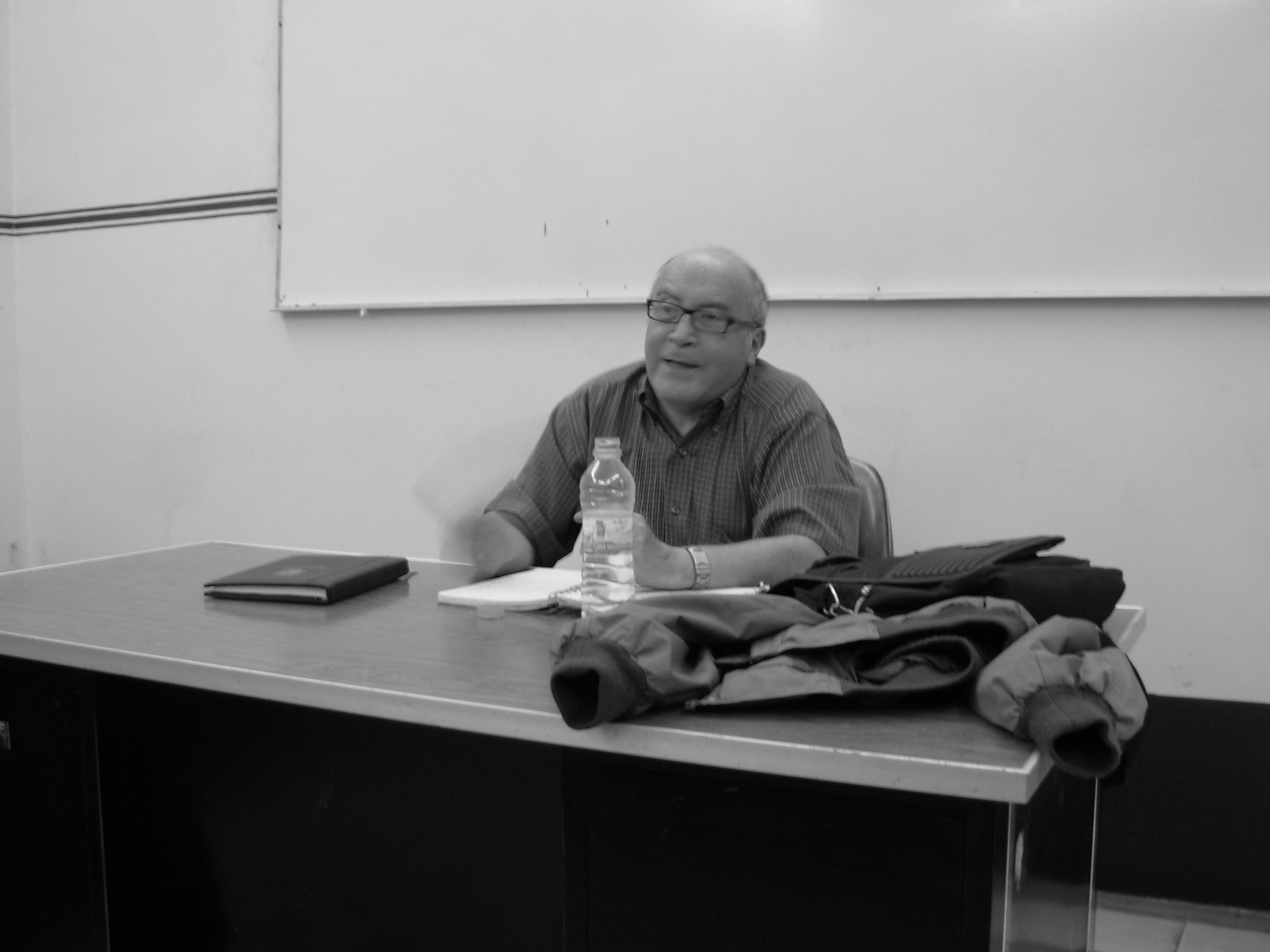
- Born: Renato Prada Oropeza; October 17, 1937; Potosí, Bolivia
- Died: September 9, 2011 (aged 73); Puebla, Puebla, Mexico
- Education: Doctorate in Linguistics
- Alma mater: Sapienza University of Rome; Catholic University of Leuven
- Occupations: Novelist, poet, literary critics, professor
- Spouse: Elda Rojas Aldunate
- Children: Ingmar, Fabrizio, Ixchel
- Writing career
- Language: Spanish
- Period: 1969–2011
- Genres: novel, short story, poetry
- Notable work: Los fundadores del alba
- Literary movement: Post-Modernism

Renato Prada Oropeza (born October 17, 1937 – September 9, 2011) was a Bolivian and Mexican scientist-literary researcher and writer, author of novels, short stories and poetry books, hermeneutics, semiotics and literary theory. Many of his literary works have been translated into several languages. He was one of the most distinguished semioticians in Mexico and Latin America.

== Biography ==
He was born in Potosí, Bolivia, in 1937. In 1976, due to the dictatorship in Bolivia, he moved to Mexico, where in 1983 he became a citizen. From 1976, Prada was a professor at the Autonomous University in Xalapa, Mexico, and at the Autonomous University of Puebla. He was also an academician of the National Council for Science and Technology of Mexico (an analog of the Academy of Sciences in other countries).

He was married to the Mexican art historian Elda Rojas Aldunate. Their children are Ixchel Vanessa, who is a designer (especially a theatre designer); Ingmar, a researcher and professor of physics; and Fabrizio Prada, who is a Mexican film director.

Oropeza died in Puebla, Mexico, on September 9, 2011; the cause of death was kidney cancer.

== Science and literature ==
Oropeza held the degree of Doctor of Philosophy from the Sapienza University of Rome and a Doctor of Linguistics from the Catholic University of Leuven in Belgium.

He was the head of the scientific school of semiotics in the Autonomous University of Puebla and editor of some Mexican academic journals on literary theory and linguistics and semiotics. He directed doctoral researches, and his disciples work in Mexico, the United States, Italy, Russia, Guatemala, Spain and other countries.

Some novels and short stories by Renato Prada have been translated into English and other languages. In addition to his literary and scientific work, he wrote the screenplays of some Mexican feature films, such as Tiempo Real (2002) and Chiles Xalapeños (2008), and several short films.

His novel Los fundadores del alba, winner of Prize Casa de las Américas in 1969, is considered one of the most significant works of Bolivian literature.

== Awards ==
- Casa de las Américas (1969) for the novel Los fundadores del alba
- Premio Nacional de Novela Erich Guttentag (1969)
- Premio "Franja de Oro" of La Paz (Bolivia) (1970)
- State Prize of Mexico (2008)

== Publications ==
=== Novels ===
- El último filo (1975, Planeta, Barcelona; 1985, Plaza & Janés, Barcelona; 1987, Arte y literatura, La Habana)
- Los fundadores del alba (published in Spain, Cuba, Bolivia, Mexico)
- Larga hora: la vigilia (1979, Premiá)
- Mientras cae la noche (1988, UV, Xalapa)
- ...Poco después, humo (1989, BUAP, Col. Asteriscos, Puebla)

=== Short stories ===
- Argal (1967, Los Amigos del Libro, Cochabamba)
- Ya nadie espera al hombre (1969, Don Bosco, La Paz)
- Al borde del silencio (1970, Alfa, Montivedeo)
- La ofrenda y otros relatos (1981, Premiá)
  - (in German) single story: "Faruke". Transl. José Antonio Friedl Zapata. In: Ein neuer Name, ein fremdes Gesicht. 26 Erzählungen aus Lateinamerika. Luchterhand. Neuwied 1987, pp 198–211
- Los nombres del infierno (1985, Universidad Autónoma de Chiapas)
- La noche con Orgalia y otros cuentos (1997, Universidad Iberoamericana y Universidad Autónoma de Tlaxcala)
- A través del hueco (1998, UNAM, Col. Rayuela, México)
- El pesebre y otros cuentos (2003, UNAM Col. Rayuela, México)
- Las máscaras de 'el Otro' (2008, UV, Col. Ficción y BUAP).

=== Poetry ===
- Palabras iniciales (2006, Editora de Gobierno, México)
- Ritual (2009, Secretaría de Cultura del estado de Puebla, México)

=== Screenplays ===
- En el umbral (1995)
- Más abajo (1998)
- La noche con Orgalia (2000)
- Tiempo Real (2002)
- Chiles Xalapeños (2008)

=== Semiotics ===
- La autonomía literaria (1970, Los Amigos del Libro, Cochabamba)
- El lenguaje narrativo. Prolegómenos para una semiótica narrativa (1979, Educa, Costa Rica)
- Poética y liberación en la narrativa de Onelio Jorge Cardoso (1988, UV, Xalapa)
- Los sentidos del símbolo I (1990, UV, Xalapa)
- El lenguaje narrativo (1991, Departamento Editorial, Universidad Autónoma de Zacatecas)
- Análisis e interpretación del discurso narrativo-literario (1993, Departamento Editorial, Universidad Autónoma de Zacatecas)
- La narrativa de Sergio Pitol: los cuentos (1997, UV, Xalapa)
- Los sentidos del símbolo II (1998, Iberoamericana Golfo)
- Literatura y realidad (1999, F.C.E/UV/BUAP)
- El discurso-testimonio (2001, UNAM)
- Hermenéutica. Símbolo y conjetura (2003, Ibero/BUAP)
- La constelación narrativa de Ignacio Solares (2003, Ediciones y Gráficos Eón, Benemérita Universidad Autónoma de Puebla)
- La narrativa de la revolución mexicana. Primer periodo (2007, Universidad Veracruzana/UIA Puebla)
- Los sentidos del símbolo III (2007, UV)
- Estética del discurso literario (2010, F.C.E.-BUAP)
