= Jaime Sáenz =

Bolivian writer, dramaturge, and professor (1921–1986)

Jaime Saenz
- Jaime Saenz by Javier Molina, from Imágenes paceñas (1979)
- Born: 8 October 1921; La Paz, Bolivia
- Died: 16 August 1986 (aged 64); La Paz, Bolivia
- Occupations: Writer, poet, storyteller

Jaime Sáenz Guzmán (8 October 1921 – 16 August 1986) was a Bolivian writer, poet, novelist, journalist, essayist, illustrator, dramaturge, and professor, known best for his narrative and poetic works. His poetry, though individual to the point of being difficult to classify, bears some similarities with surrealist literature.

He was born, lived, and died in the city of La Paz, which would come to be the setting permanently in the background of each of his works. He is recognized as one of the most important authors in Bolivian literature, as both his life and his work prominently highlighted 20th century Bolivian culture. There are a number of academic studies on his work, as well as translations in English, Italian, and German.

Throughout his life, Sáenz struggled with alcoholism, a struggle which he frequently wrote about in his poems. Accordingly, he is often viewed as a poète maudit or "cursed poet". Sáenz was openly, "unashamedly" bisexual.

== Biography ==
Sáenz was born on 8 October 1921 in La Paz, Bolivia. His father was Genaro Sáenz Rivero, the lieutenant colonel of the Bolivian Army, and his mother Graciela Guzmán Lazarte. His humanistic and artistic formation began in La Paz, being sent to the Muñoz School in 1926 for primary school, and then to the American Institute of La Paz for secondary, which he finished in 1937.

In 1938, he traveled to Germany with some classmates and cadets from the Military School of Bolivia. This trip to Europe greatly affected the direction of his work, as he was strongly influenced by the works of philosophers Arthur Schopenhauer, Hegel, Martin Heidegger, and writers Thomas Mann, William Blake, and Franz Kafka; as for his music tastes, Saenz enjoyed Richard Wagner and Anton Bruckner.

In 1939, he returned to Bolivia and in 1941 he started to work in the Bolivian Department of Defense, then in the Bolivian Treasury. In 1942, he joined the United States Information Service (USIS) at the U.S. Embassy in La Paz. Two years later, he married a German citizen, Erika Käseberg, and in 1947 they had a daughter named Jourlaine. In 1948, due to Sáenz's relapses into dipsomania, Erika left Sáenz and returned to Germany with their daughter. In 1944, he published the first volume of his magazine Cornamusa. In 1952 he left his job at the USIS. In 1955, he published El escalpelo (The Scalpel) and in 1957 Muerte por el tacto (Death by Touch). Around then he also published Aniversario de una visión (Anniversary of a Vision) (1960), Visitante profundo (Immanent Visitor) (1964), and the first volume of his magazine Vertical (1965). In 1967, he published El frío (The Cold), and the Arca Gallery exhibited his illustrations of skulls, of which there were various. In 2002, his selected poems, Immanent Visitor (trans. Forrest Gander and Kent Johnson), was brought out in a bilingual edition by University of California Press; and in 2007, Princeton University Press published a bilingual volume of "The Night" (trans. Forrest Gander and Kent Johnson).

In 1967, he befriended Carlos Alfredo Rivera, with whom he shared a very close friendship, so much so that it is said Sáenz was the only one who paid attention to Dr. Rivera. And for that same reason, Rivera forbade him to drink. Sáenz began following that order, but died after a few weeks due to two crises of delerium tremens.

=== Saenz and his professorship ===
In 1970, he earned a professorship in Bolivian Literature with a dissertation on Alcides Arguedas at the Universidad Mayor de San Andrés (UMSA) in La Paz. In 1974, he presented a theatrical play called La noche del viernes (Friday Night) and a libretto for his opera Perdido viajero (Lost Traveler).

With the support of scholars, and invited by some students, Sáenz opened a Poetry Workshop in the Literature Program of the UMSA in 1978. That same year, he published Imágenes paceñas (Images from La Paz).

A notable exhibition was of his work Calaveras (Skulls), in which he presented about twenty pictures, including: Calavera que resistía a ser calavera (Skull that Resisted Being a Skull), Calavera con dolor de muelas (Skull with Toothache), Calavera en vitrina (Skull in Showcase), Calavera desnutrida (Malnourished Skull), Calavera en desgracia (Skull in Misfortune), Calavera de un muerto (Dead Man's Skull), among other skulls done in indigenous styles.

=== The Krupp Workshops ===
Nighttime reunions with Jaime Sáenz were hosted for years, and until the moment of his death they were a space for the marginalized and the rebellious to have rich intellectual exchange. The famous "Krupp Workshop", the venue where Sáenz received his visitors, was converted into an institution, where the publication of literary magazines, games of dice, music by Anton Bruckner or Simeón Roncal, chats about Milarepa, and lectures on poetry were the permanent foundation.

=== Sáenz, alcohol, and his death ===
Fascination with death was something experiential for Sáenz. Like he himself reports in his most autobiographical book, La piedra imán (The Lodestone) (1989), visiting the morgue to contemplate the dead was one of the extravagant activities he participated in as a youth. But one should not see this as a necrophilic act, but as an obsession to understand life and death as a unity, which he came to call "La Verdadera Vida (True Life)".

Sáenz claimed to have reached true life, which is also access to the transcendental conscience that he aspired to have.

"While alive, the man will not be able to understand the world; the man ignores that as long he does not stop living, he will not be wise". [...] "What does living have to do with life; living is one thing and life is another thing, life and death are one and the same".

The impact of alcohol is greatly explored in two works: the poem La noche (The Night) (1984) and the novel Felipe Delgado (1979). Sáenz denied many times that this novel was autobiographical in nature, but one cannot fail to see some aspects of his personal life within it, especially the references to his time as an alcoholic.

His voluntary renunciation of alcohol, which took place sometime in the 1960s, was one of his greatest achievements of his life. Save for sporadic relapses, Sáenz did not go back to drinking until just before his death in 1986. The years where he was distanced from alcohol were when he was most productive. In 1980, one of his relapses brought him to the brink of death, thus sparking inspiration for La noche (The Night), a collection of poems that can be classified as "frightening" due to its subject matter rooted in his near-death experience.

Sáenz died in La Paz on 16 August 1986, surrounded by his dearest friends and colleagues. He was buried the next day in the city's General Cemetery.

== Homages ==
In La Paz, a street in the Cota Cota neighborhood is named after Jaime Sáenz. A plaza in the macrodistrict San Antonio is also named in his memory, and is near the Jaime Sáenz Cultural District House.

== Works ==
=== Poetry books ===
- (1955) El escalpelo
- (1957) Cuatro poemas para mi madre
- (1957) Muerte por el tacto
- (1960) Aniversario de una visión
- (1964) Visitante profundo; English Translation: Immanent Visitor: Selected poems of Jaime Saenz (2002)
- (1967) El frío English Translation: The Cold (2015)
- (1973) Recorrer esta distancia (anthology)
- (1978) Bruckner
- (1978) Las tinieblas
- (1982) Al pasar un cometa
- (1984) La noche; English Translation: The Night (2007)

=== Short stories ===
- (1972) El aparapita de La Paz
- (1979) Imágenes paceñas
- (1985) Los cuartos
- (1986) Vidas y Muertes (posthumous)
- (1989) La piedra imán (posthumous)
- (1996) Obras inéditas (posthumous compilation)
  - Carta de amor
  - Santiago de Machaca
  - El señor Balboa
- (2009) Tocnolencias (posthumous)

=== Novels ===
- (1979) Felipe Delgado
- (1991) Los papeles de Narciso Lima-Achá

=== Theatre ===
- (2005) Obra dramática (posthumous compilation)
  - La máscara
  - Perdido viajero
  - La noche del viernes

==== Visual art ====
- (2005) Obra plástica (posthumous compilation)

==== Collections of Sáenz's work ====
It is worth noting that Sáenz never re-released his own works. These collections were compiled and published with no connection to Sáenz himself. The copyright status of many of these works is vague.

- (1975) Plural Editores, Obra poética
- (2000) Café y mosquitero
- (2004) Recorrer esta distancia: Antología poética
- (2005) La bodega de Jaime Sáenz
- (2007) El escalpelo; Aniversario de una visión; Visitante profundo; El frío
- (2008) Prosa breve
- (2011) La crítica y el poeta
- (2015) Poesía reunida

== See also ==
- Bolivian literature
