= General Cemetery of La Paz =

Cemetery in La Paz, Bolivia

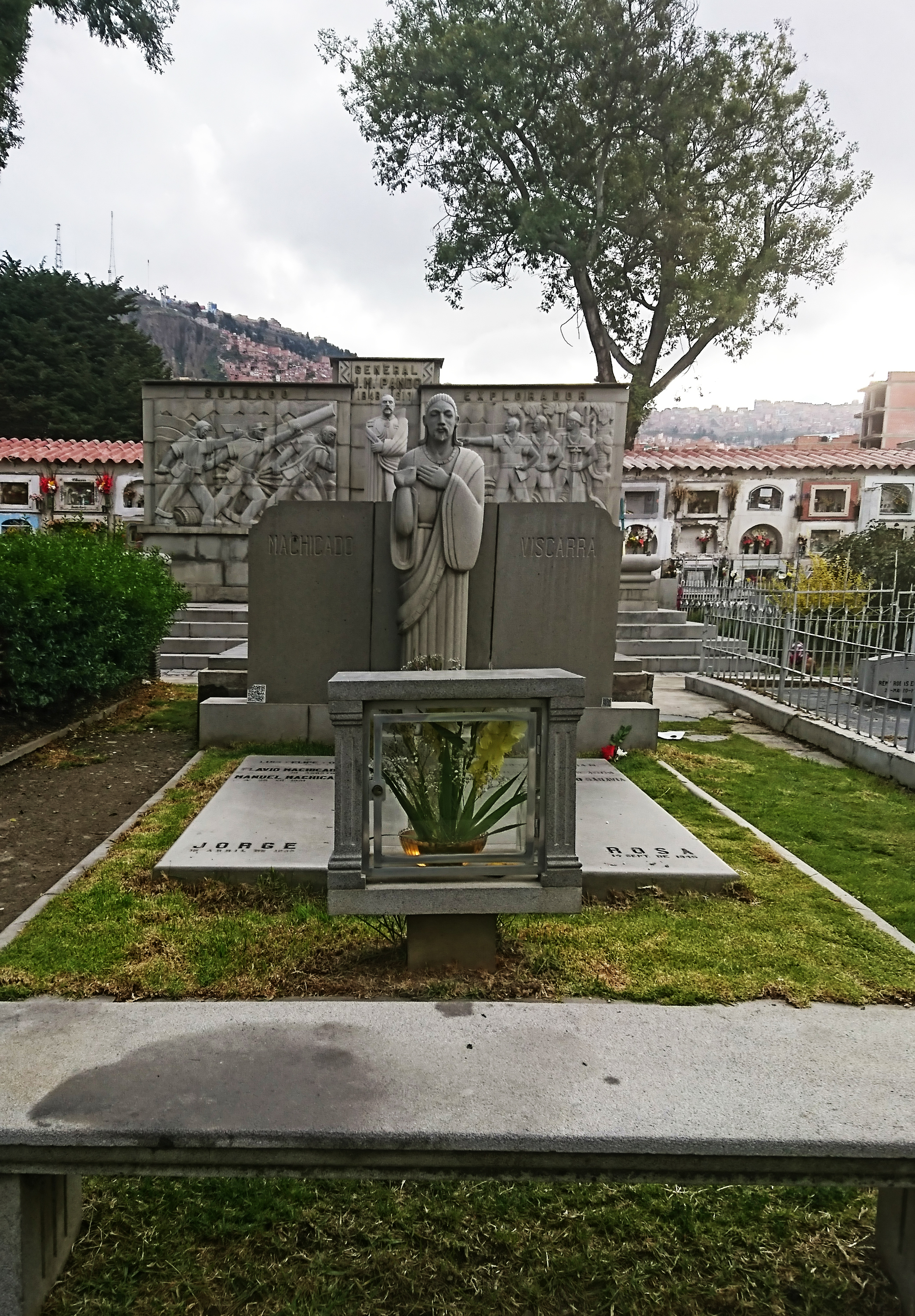
- Tomb of Flavio Machicado in the General Cemetery of La Paz
- Interactive map of General Cemetery of La Paz

Details
- Established: 1826
- Location: La Paz
- Country: Bolivia
- Coordinates: 16°29′49″S 68°09′06″W
- Type: Public

The General Cemetery of La Paz (Cementerio General de La Paz) is a public cemetery located in the Max Paredes macro-district, in the northwest area of La Paz, Bolivia, and has an area of 92,000 square meters.

== History ==
The General Cemetery of La Paz was established during the presidency of Andrés de Santa Cruz, according to D.S. of Antonio José de Sucre which establishes the implementation of cemeteries throughout the country.

== Characteristics ==
The General Cemetery has a main entrance for the entrance of the funeral processions, this entrance has an arch that marks the access from Avenida Baptista, the entrance leads directly to the main chapel, a Catholic temple designed by the urban architect Julio Mariaca Pando. The configuration and structure of the cemetery corresponds to different stages of construction and includes different styles. The layout presents pedestrian pathways of different materials that connect group pavilions called barracks, as well as family and personal mausoleums and tributes to prominent figures.

== Notable interments ==
- José Manuel Pando (1849–1917) president of Bolivia (1899-1904).
- Jaime Sáenz (1921–1986), writer
