= Fernando Ramirez Velarde =

Bolivian writer

- Born: 8 May 1913
- Died: 23 August 1948 (aged 35)
- Occupation: Writer
- Known for: Novel Sinkholes of Anguish (1947)

Fernando Ramirez Velarde (8 May 1913 – 23 August 1948) was a Bolivian writer. He attended a Jesuit college and began studying law in Cochabamba, before he was drafted into the Chaco War. From 1937, he worked in industry and trade. He is best known for his novel Sinkholes of Anguish (1947) which depicts the misery and tragedy of indigenous peoples in Bolivia. The book is considered to be among the best novels in Bolivian literature.
