= Cé Mendizábal =

Bolivian author (born 1956)

Cé Mendizábal (born 1956) is a Bolivian poet and writer. He was born Carlos Félix Mendizábal Rivera, in the city of Oruro. He is a two-time winner of the National Novel Award for his books Alguien más acargo (2000) and Pasado por sal (2014). He has also published several books of poetry and short stories.
