= Néstor Taboada Terán =

Bolivian writer

Néstor Taboada Terán (8 September 1929 – 8 June 2015) was a Bolivian writer, novelist, historian, journalist and university professor.

== Biography ==
He was born in La Paz and, in his youth, worked as a linotypist before he became a journalist. A prolific author, he wrote some 128 books in his long life, among them the novels Manchay Puytu (1977) and El signo escalonado (1975), both of which are considered among the best novels in Bolivian literature. He also won the National Novel Award for his work La Virgen de los Deseos (2008). His work inspired the book by the doctor in Latin American literature, Keith Richards, Lo imaginario mestizo: aislamiento y dislocación de la visión de Bolivia de Néstor Taboada Terán (1999), originally presented in 1994 as a doctoral thesis (The mestizo imaginary) at King's College, University of London.

In 1993, the musical Manchay Puytu, the Sound of Fear premiered at the Museum of Modern Art in New York, and in 1995, Bolivian composer Alberto Villalpando premiered the lyric opera Manchay Puytu, based on Taboada Terán's novel.

Among many honours, both domestic and international, he was a member of the Bolivian Academy of Language.
