= Santiago Vaca Guzman =

Bolivian writer

Santiago Vaca Guzmán
- Born: c. 1847; Sucre, Bolivia
- Died: 1896 (aged 48–49); Buenos Aires, Argentina
- Occupation(s): Writer, Lawyer, Journalist
- Notable work: Su excelencia y su ilustrisima

Santiago Vaca Guzman (Sucre, c. 1847 – Buenos Aires, 1896) was a Bolivian writer. He trained as a lawyer and worked as a journalist, founding the newspaper La Patria in Sucre in 1871. As a writer, he published both fiction and poetry. His novel Su excelencia y su ilustrisima is regarded as one of the finest in Bolivian literature.

His political stance against the caudillos Mariano Melgarejo and Agustin Morales forced him to go into exile. He died in Argentina in 1896.
