= Juan de la Rosa (novel) =

Juan de la Rosa: Memoirs of the Last Soldier of the Independence Movement is a book by the writer Nataniel Aguirre about the Bolivian War of Independence, published in 1885. It's considered to be written with some of the style from the Romanticism period, despite having been published about thirty years after the considered 'end' of this period. The tone is often idealistic, spurring on pride towards the Bolivian identity and culture.

The novel is told from the perspective of an aged revolutionary--Colonel Juan de la Rosa--reminiscing over the outbreak of insurrection against the Spanish Empire in Bolivia. It was one of the first major works of Bolivian literature, and even today is highly ranked among classic Bolivian literature due to its patriotic nature. Some of the events portrayed in the book include de la Rosa's childhood, the death of his mother Rosita, alongside military battles and events experienced by de la Rosa.
