= Magela Baudoin =

Bolivian author

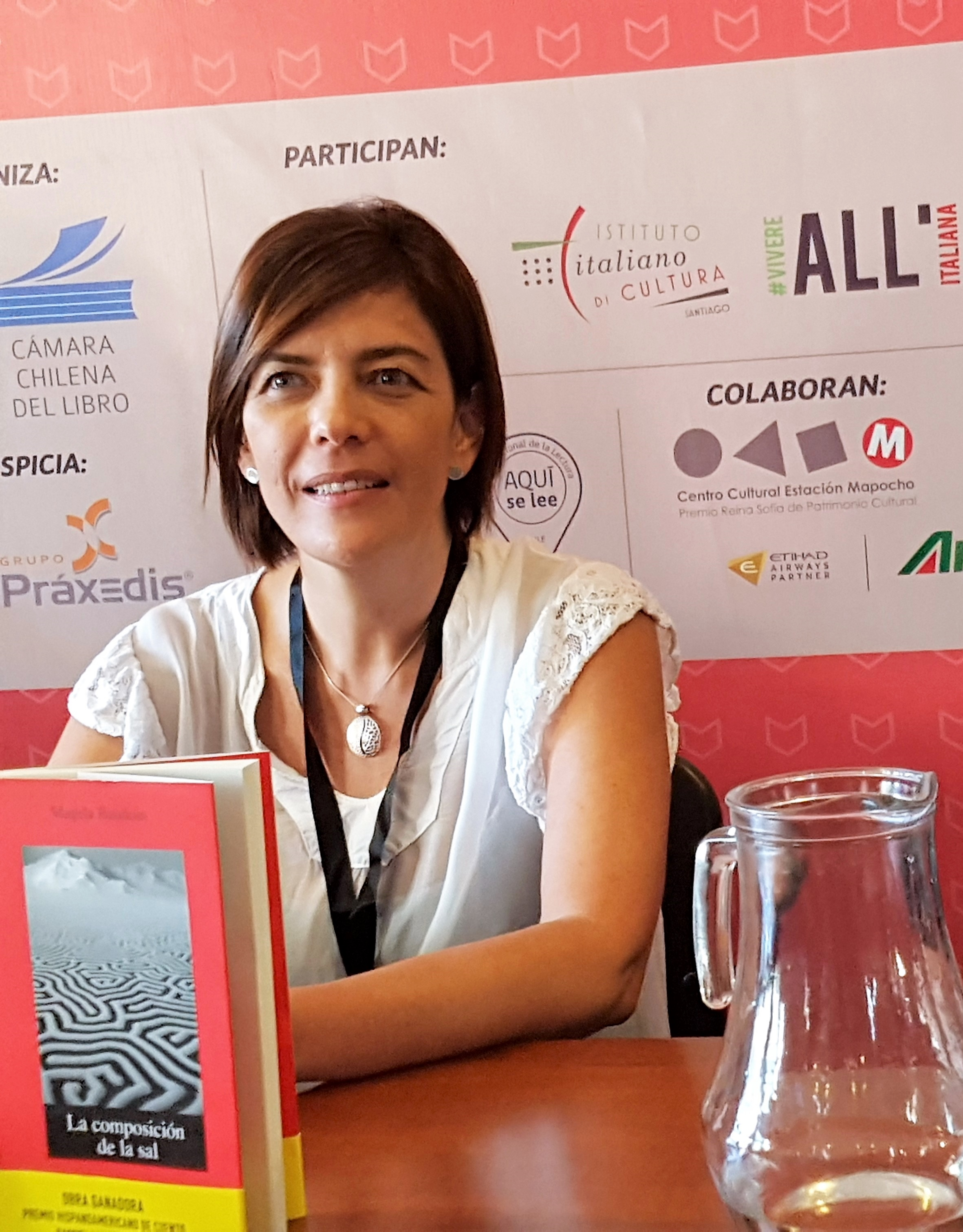
Baudoin at the Santiago International Book Fair 2017

Magela Baudoin Teran (Caracas, January 3, 1973) is a Bolivian author who has won the Gabriel García Márquez Spanish American Short Story Award for her collection La composición de la sal (Salt's Composition).

Her book El sonido de la H won the National Novel Award in 2014.

She currently teaches at the University of Oregon.

== Books ==
- El sonido de la H
- La composición de la sal (published in English as Sleeping Dragons)
