= Armando Alba Zambrana =

Bolivian writer, journalist, historian, and politician

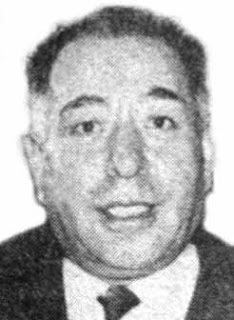

Minister of Education and Indigenous Affairs
- In office 10 March 1947 – 14 January 1948
- President: Enrique Hertzog
- Preceded by: Manuel Elías P.
- Succeeded by: Alberto Salinas López

Personal details
- Born: 9 February 1901
- Died: 10 October 1974 (aged 73)

Armando Alba Zambrana (9 February 1901 – 10 October 1974) was a Bolivian writer, journalist, historian and politician from Potosí. He won Bolivia's National Culture Award in 1969. He was an important member of Gesta Bárbara and founded the Editorial Potosí group of writers. During the administration of President Enrique Hertzog, Alba was appointed Minister of Education and Indigenous Affairs. He was also the Bank Secretary of Potosí and the 100th anniversary of birth was celebrated in 2001.

== Works ==
- Voces áulicas (poetry, 1918).
- Temple de la montaña y otros cuentos (stories, 1926).
- Imagen de Potosí y de su Casa Real de Moneda (essays, 1946).
- Enumeración del Proceso Potosino y "Gesta Bárbara" (essays, 1946).
- Del viejo hontanar (poetry, 1970).
- Bolívar (anthology, 1970).
- Prólogos escogidos (2001).
- Imagen de Potosí (2001).

== Bibliography ==
- Álvarez del Real, María Eloísa (1991). 12.000 minibiografías. Panamá: América, S.A. p. 21. ISBN 0-944499-76-7.
- Blanco Mamani, Elías (2005). Enciclopedia Gesta de autores de la literatura boliviana. La Paz: Plural Editores. p. 15. ISBN 99905-63-62-4.
- Gisbert, Carlos D. Mesa (2003). Presidentes de Bolivia: entre urnas y fusiles : el poder ejecutivo, los ministros de estado (in Spanish). Editorial Gisbert. pp. 344–347.

Political offices
Preceded by Manuel Elías P.	Minister of Education and Indigenous Affairs; 1947–1948	Succeeded by Alberto Salinas López
