= Antonio Díaz Villamil =

Bolivian writer

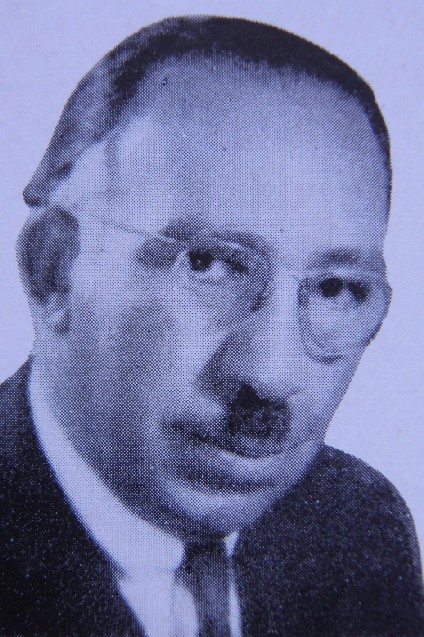
Image of Antonio Díaz Villamil

Antonio Díaz Villamil (Note: In this Hispanic American name, the first or paternal surname is Díaz and the second or maternal family name is Villamil.) (1897–1948) was a Bolivian writer. He graduated from the Instituto Nacional Superior, and became a teacher. He rose to become director of the Colegio Bolivar, La Paz. A prolific writer, he wrote fiction and drama, and also textbooks. His most important work is the costumbrista novel La nina de sus ojos (1948), widely regarded as one of the best novels in Bolivian literature.
