= Juan Wallparrimachi =

Bolivian poet (c. 1793–1814)

Juan Wallparrimachi Mayta (Potosí, c. 1793–1814) was a Bolivian poet and pro-independence guerrilla fighter who wrote in Quechua. He worked in his people's tradition while also producing décima in indigenous language. His work fell into relative neglect.

== Biography ==
Wallparrimachi was born in the village of Macha, in the Chayanta Province of the Potosí Department in Bolivia. The grandson of a Portuguese Jew, and the son of an indigenous mother from Cuzco, Peru, and a Spanish father, who both died shortly after his birth. He was raised by indigenous people and later recruited by the guerrillas Manuel Ascensio Padilla and Juana Azurduy de Padilla, with whom he fought against the Spanish government. As he only knew the surname of his maternal grandfather, he adopted it.

He died at the age of 20, in an 1814 battle in the Bolivian War of Independence, under the command of his leader and protector, Juana Azurduy. He has passed into immortality as a "poet-soldier" in Bolivian literature.
