= Raza de Bronce =

Novel by Alcides Arguedas

Raza de Bronce (Race of Bronze) is a 1919 novel by the Bolivian writer Alcides Arguedas. It is considered one of the most important novels in Bolivian literature, and has been recognized as such by a number of critical studies as well as by the Bolivian government. The novel was published by Prometeo; a French translation appeared in 1919 but as of 2023, no English translation exists.

Divided in two parts, the novel is a sympathetic treatment of the plight of the Aymara Indians living in the hostile yet beautiful landscape of the Andean altiplano. Arguedas explores the social, economic and ecological conditions facing the highland Indians, focusing as well on the racism and exploitation of white colonizers.

Written at a time of great political turbulence, Raza de Bronce is considered to be the first text in the indigenismo movement in Bolivia, and a notable work even in the wider context of Latin America. It has been a standard text in the Bolivian school curriculum for many decades. In 1976, it was adapted by the theatre company La Máscara into an award-winning play that has remained popular with audiences.
