= Gary Daher Canedo =

Bolivian writer

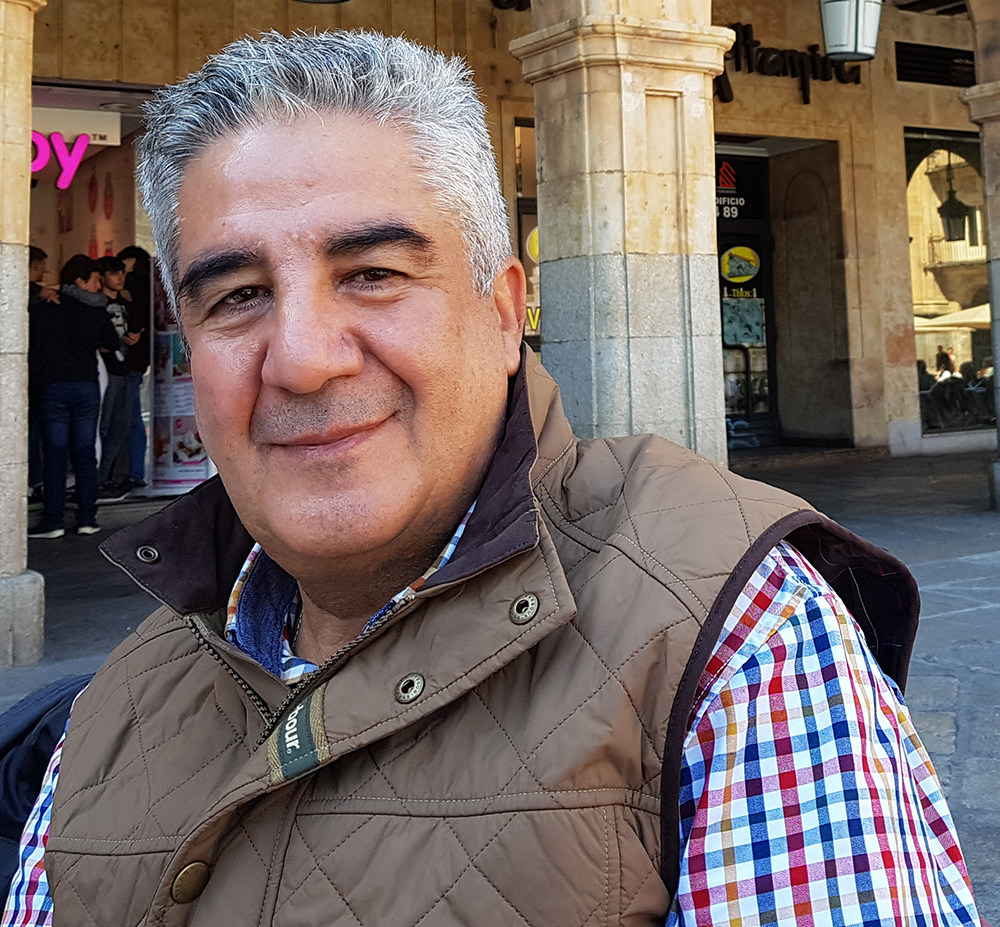
Gary Daher Canedo

Gary Daher Canedo (born 31 October 1956) is a Bolivian writer.

== Career ==
Together with the poets Ariel Perez and Juan Carlos Ramiro Quiroga, he formed the poetry circle that came to be known as Club del Café or Club del Ajenjo. They published the poetry collection Errores compartidos (1995) and the poetry magazine called Mal menor. In the early 1990s, he ran with the poets Vilma Tapia Anaya and Álvaro Antezana the literary weekly El Pabellón del Vacio, notable for its contributions to literary criticism in Bolivian literature.

== Selected works ==
Novels:

- El Olor de las llaves (Ed. Milenio, 1999)
- El huésped (Ed. La Hoguera, 2004)
- El lugar imperfecto (Ed. Gente Común, 2005).

His poetry titles include:

- Poemas y Silencios (1992)
- Los Templos (Ed. Arol, 1993)
- Desde el otro lado del oscuro espejo (Ed. Acción, 1995)
- Cantos desde un campo de mieses (FEMSC, 2001, Ed. El Perro y la Rana, 2008)
- Tamil (Ed. Gente Común, 2006)
- Oruga Interior (Ed. Plural, 2006)
- Territorios de Guerra (Ed. Gente Común, 2007)
- Viaje de Narciso (Ed. Plural, 2009)
- La Senda de Samai (Ed. Gente Común 3600, 2013

He is also a translator, and has translated Sappho and Catullus among others.
