= Fernando Diez de Medina =

Bolivian writer (1908–1990)

Fernando Diez de Medina (1908–1990) was a Bolivian writer.

After serving in the Chaco War, he became a journalist. He was involved with broadcast and print outlets such as Radio Illimani, Ultima Hora, Cordillera and Novo. He was a member of the Revolutionary Nationalist Movement after the 1952 Bolivian revolution. He chaired the Educational Reform Commission that drafted the Bolivian Education Code (1955). He served as Minister of Education in 1956–1957.

As a writer, he published novels, poetry, stories, essays and plays. Among his best-known works is his novel Mateo Montemayor (1969), considered among the finest novels in Bolivian literature.
