= Veronica Ormachea Gutierrez =

Bolivian writer and journalist

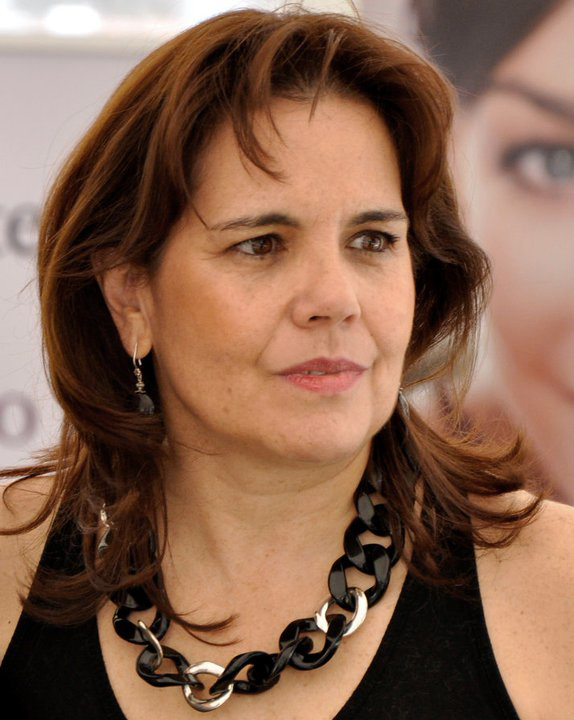
- Born: 30 July 1956 (age 69); New York City
- Spouse: Ramiro Montes Sáenz
- Children: 2

Veronica Ormachea Gutierrez (born 30 July 1956) is a Bolivian writer and journalist. She is a member of the Bolivian Academy of Royal Spanish Academy.

== Biography ==
Ormachea was born in New York City on July 30, 1956. She was born there because of the exile of her parents in the wake of the 1952 revolution. She is the daughter of industrialist Víctor Ormachea Zalles and Martha Gutiérrez. She married Ramiro Montes Sáenz and has two children: Verónica and Ramiro Montes Ormachea. As of June 2023 she is a grandmother to 1 child: Rafaella Maxime.

Ormachea graduated in Interdisciplinary Studies in Communications, Legal Institutions, Economics and Government at the American University in Washington, D.C. 1980. She obtained the Higher Diploma of French Language and Civilization at the Sorbonne in 1983. She graduated from the Master's in Political Science, Mention in Bolivian Studies at the University of San Simón de Cochabamba (CESU CEBEM) in 1997. She participated in the Executive Program for Development Leaders of the Harvard Kennedy School of Government in 1999. She worked as a diplomat in the Ministry of Foreign Affairs of Bolivia. She had children and she dedicated herself to writing. She received the Franz Tamayo Prize for Literary Creation from the Association of Journalists of La Paz (APLZ) in 2001.

Since that year, Ormachea began as a columnist in the newspaper La Razón de Bolivia until 2010, when the independent newspaper Pagina Siete de Bolivia was founded where she wrote until the newspaper shut down in June 2023. The Ministry of Culture and Tourism of Bolivia awarded her the diploma "In recognition of his career and literary production as a valuable contribution to artistic and cultural development in the country" in 2009. She also writes in digital newspapers such as El Debate, SudamericaHoy and Mundiario. She was a jurist of the Cervantes Prize in 2015. She is presently a columnist for the newspaper El Nacional and a member of PEN International.

== Works ==
- Entierro sin muerte - El secuestro de Doria Media por el MRTA, La Paz Crónica. ISBN 99905-2-038-0 (1998)
  - Buried Alive. The kidnapping of Doria Medina by the MRTA. Translation Leif Yourston. Non-fiction. ISBN 978-99954-52-89-6 (2012)
- Los ingenuos La Paz, Alfaguara, Novela. ISBN 978-99905-924-3-6 (2007)
- Los ingenuos. USA, Ed. La Pereza. Spanish Edition, Novela Histórica. ISBN 978-1623751616 (2020)
- Los infames La Paz, Ed. Gisbert. ISBN 978-99974-834-5-4 (2016)
- Los infames Madrid, Ed. Lord Byron, Novela. ISBN 978-84-9949-891-1 (2016)
- El Che, Miradas personales Participan otros autores. Ed.Plural. Ensayo. ISBN 978-99954-1-802-1 (2017)
- Hochschild´s Passports. USA. Lazy Publisher. Historical novel. Translation Katie Fry. ISBN 9781623751357 (2019)
- Neruda y su laberinto pasional. Madrid. Sial Pigmalion. Novel. ISBN 978-84-19370-66-2 (2023)

== Awards ==
- Ganadora (Premio Franz Tamayo, 2001)
- Ganadora (Premio al Mérito y a la trayectoria, 2009)
- Finalista (Premio Nacional de Novela, 2007)
- Reconocimiento: Al compromiso y vocacion de servicio en beneficio a la comunidad Rotary Club, La Paz, Bolivia, marzo 2021.
- Ganadora: Premio Escriduende a la mejor autora iberoamericana Feria del Libro, Madrid, ESP, junio 2023.
- Ganadora: 'Neruda y su laberinto pasional. Novela ganadora a la mejor autora del premio ILBO International Latino Book Award, EEUU, septiembre 2024.
