= Gastón Suárez =

Bolivian novelist and dramatist

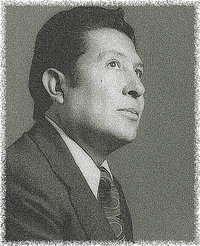
Gastón Suárez Gastón Suárez pictured in La Paz in 1976
- Born: Juan Gastón Suárez Paredes; 27 January 1929; Tupiza, Bolivia
- Died: 6 November 1984 (aged 55); La Paz, Bolivia
- Spouse: Edmy Santalla Pabón
- Children: Patricia, Rossana, Ronald and Ruy Omar
- Writing career
- Genres: Novels, short stories, drama
- Notable works: Mallko; Vértigo; The Gesture; Despues del Invierno
- Literary movement: Latin American Boom, magic realism

Gastón Suárez (January 27, 1929 – November 6, 1984) was a Bolivian novelist and dramatist. Suárez was born in the town of Tupiza, in the southern part of Potosí, Bolivia in 1929.

A self-taught writer, Suárez abandoned elementary school in third grade, following a traumatizing event in which his teacher suffered an epilepsy attack while reading to him. His mother, who was also a rural teacher, then decided to homeschool him. When he was ten, after reading formative literary works such as Dick Sand, A Captain at Fifteen and Jerry of the Islands, he promised himself that he would someday become a writer.

By the end of the 1950s, he began making strides to fulfill that goal. He quit his job as a banking employee from the Bolivian Mining Bank, then purchased a truck to travel and better understand his country. Throughout almost two years of trips across Bolivia, he simultaneously wrote several of his short stories while also finalizing the first draft of his play Vértigo. A few months later, he made the decision to fully dedicate himself to writing as a career.

He performed a wide range of professional roles throughout his life, including work as a railroader, rural teacher, miner, bank employee, truck driver, and journalist. His life experience granted him the opportunity to live and feel the Bolivian life in its diverse social layers. This is perhaps best reflected with a particular vision in the subjects he wrote about most: urban life, the country, and the mines.

"... Suárez goes beyond the simple fact and further than the anecdote. He subtly unveils transcendental situations. Acute observer of the human behavior, he is the most outstanding writer of psychological introversion amongst the boom of Bolivian narrators."

His first work was a storybook entitled "A vigil for the last trip" (Vigilia para el último viaje), from which "Illuminated" (Iluminado) was extracted to be included in several anthologies of Latin American writers, as a remarkable example of brief narration.

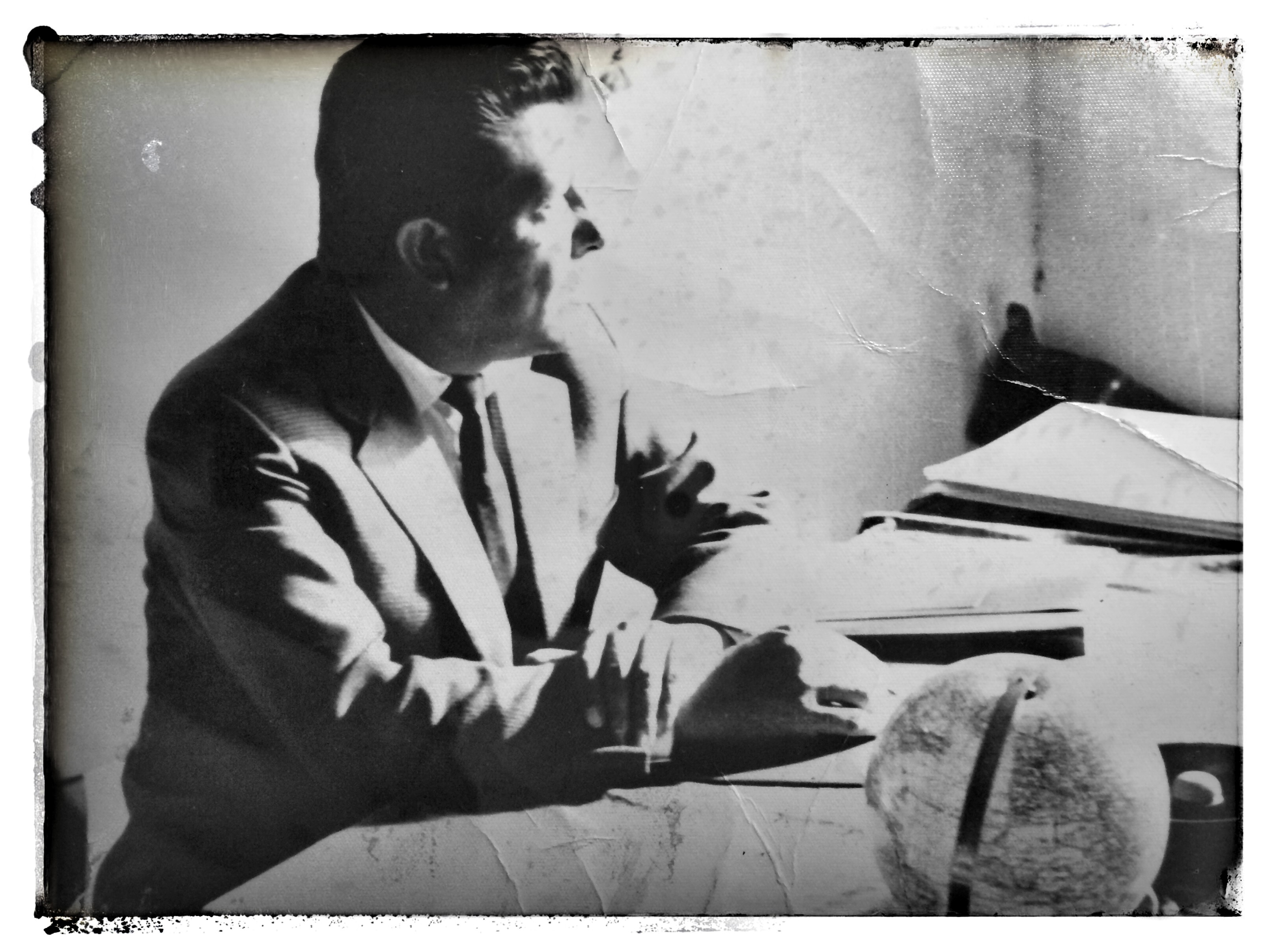

Other standout works include "The Gesture" (El Gesto), another book of short stories from which "The stranger and the silver candelabrum (El forastero y el candelabro de plata)" and "The diary of Mafalda" (El diario de Mafalda) are thought to be among the most notable.

In 1967, Suárez published his first piece for theatre, Vértigo, a drama of social and philosophical depth that depicts the life of a man being freed after twenty years in prison, as well as his efforts to gather his seven estranged children. Vertigo was made into a screenplay and presented in Jornadas Julianas de la Juventud in 1967, winning the first prize.

His most famous novel is Mallko, published in 1974. It narrates the life of a humanized Condor ("a Mallko," as it is named in the Amerindian language Aymara). The novel has elements of fiction and magic realism, using allegory to dissect the struggle for freedom and personal fulfillment. It is simultaneously considered a vivid, realistic and crude narration of the life of the Andean man. A philosophical reflection on the man's faith, meeting his own destiny, and the need to survive in isolation and constant need, the work is considered a poetic fable. It is virtually a compulsory text in Bolivia, Spain and in the signatory countries of the Andean Zone. In 1976, Mallko was included in the Honor Roll of the Hans Christian Andersen Award and described as "an exceptional example of literature with international importance".

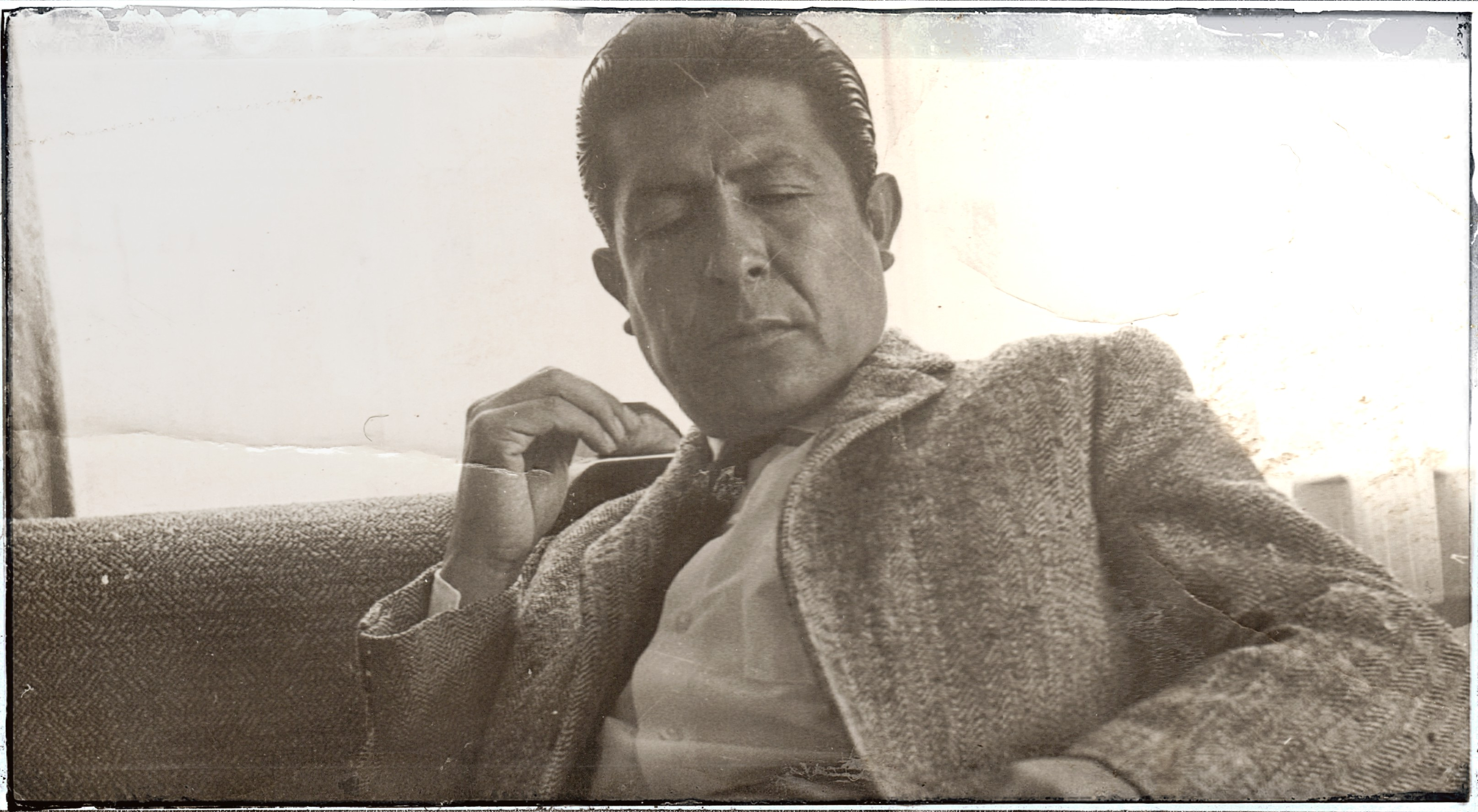

In 1979, the International Year of the Child, he published another novel, The Adventures of Miguelín Quijano (Las aventuras de Miguelín Quijano), in which Suárez utilizes metaphors and references coupled with quixotic characters to craft a parable made to ignite the creative imagination of the children, and in turn incite their interest for the work of Miguel de Cervantes.

In 1981, he published Beyond the Winter (Despues del Invierno), a drama portraying the dilemma of two brothers (Melitón and Benjamin) facing the decision of staying and caring for their ailing father or carrying on with their own lives.

Suárez died in the city of La Paz in November 1984, from sudden heart failure.

== Bibliography ==
- 1964 – The gesture (El Gesto)
- 1966 – A vigil for the last trip (Vigilia para el último viaje)
- 1967 – Vértigo
- 1969 – The girl from Hamburg (La muchacha de Hamburgo)
- 1974 – Mallko
- 1979 – The adventures of Miguelin Quijano (Las aventuras de Miguelín Quijano)
- 1980 – Beyond the winter (Después del Invierno)
