= Gamaliel Churata =

Peruvian writer

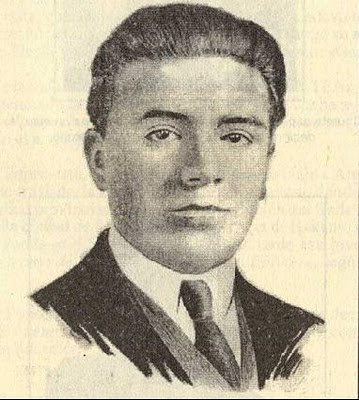
Gamaliel Churata

Arturo Peralta Miranda (born June 10, 1897; died in Lima, November 9, 1969) was a Peruvian writer. He had an active literary and political life in his country, mostly in his native city: Puno. Some say that at his time, he was one of the four major representatives of the Peruvian indigenous movement. He was known in the world of literature and journalism both in Peru and Bolivia under the pseudonyms "John Cajal", "P", "Gonzalez Saavedra," "The Man in The Street" and "Gamaliel Churata."

He arrived in Bolivia for the first time in 1917, exiled from his country for political reasons. After a short stay in La Paz, he stayed in Potosi, where he developed an intense and fruitful literary work. He returned to Bolivia in 1932, after several political conflicts succeeded in their country, this time to stay for more than thirty years in that country until 1964. In 1957 (La Paz), published "El Pez de Oro" (The Golden Fish), a mix of Andean myths with avant-garde narratives. He died in Lima on November 9, 1969.

== Literary production ==
- El pez de oro (1957)
- Resurrección de los muertos: Alfabeto del incognoscible (2010)
