= Santiago del Granado, 1st Count of Cotoca =

Santiago del Granado
- 1st Count of Cotoca
- Full name: Santiago María del Granado y Navarro Calderón
- Born: 1757; Cádiz, Spain
- Died: 1823 (aged 65–66); Santa Cruz de la Sierra, Bolivia

Santiago María del Granado y Navarro Calderón, 1st Count of Cotoca (1757–1823), was a Spanish nobleman and physician, who at the beginning of the 19th century traveled through some of the most remote regions of South America where epidemics were raging, to inoculate Native Americans with the recently discovered vaccine and prevent the spread of smallpox.

His humanitarian efforts paralleled Dr. Francisco Javier de Balmis and Dr. Josep Salvany i Lleopart's 19th-century Spanish expedition to deliver smallpox vaccine to the Spanish colonies in the Americas. He saved thousands upon thousands of lives, as reported by the Spanish viceroy at Rio de la Plata Santiago de Liniers and public health official Miguel O'Gorman to the Supreme Central and Governmental Junta of Spain and the Indies during the political upheaval of the Napoleonic invasions.

Granado was the great-great-grandfather of the Bolivian poet laureate Javier del Granado.
