= Gonzalo Lema =

Bolivian writer

Gonzalo Lema Vargas
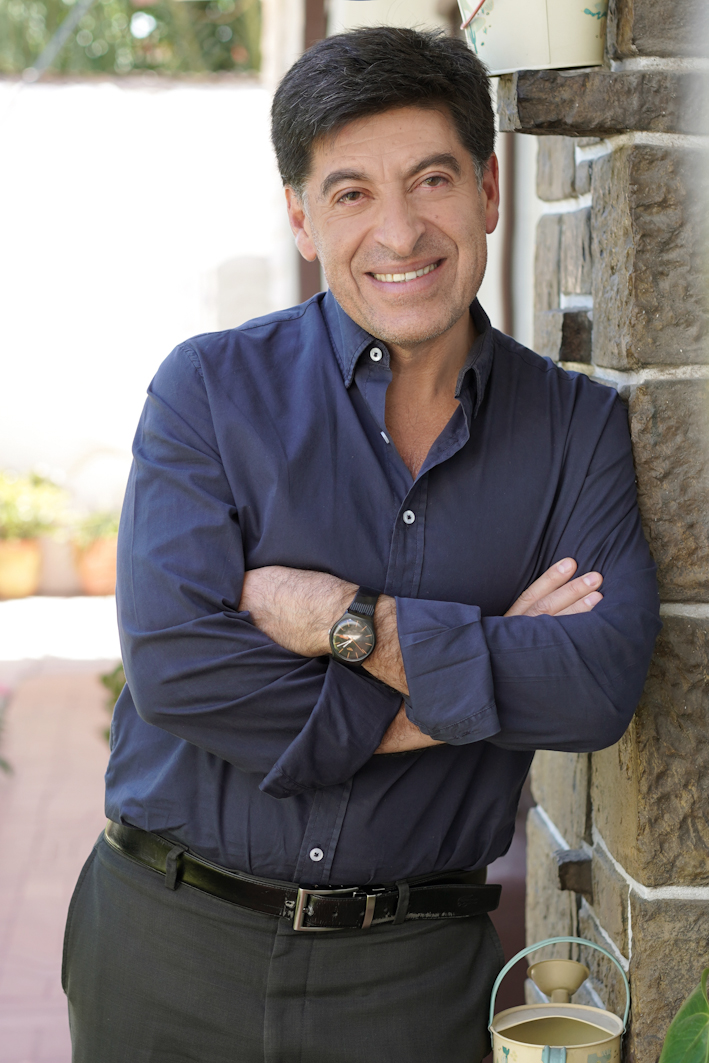
- Born: 1959 (age 65–66); Tarija, Bolivia
- Occupation: Writer
- Notable work: La vida me duele sin vos, La huella es el olvido, El hombro gordo de La Paz, Los dioses vacíos del Raspa Ríos, Que te vaya como mereces
- Awards: National Novel Award

Gonzalo Lema Vargas (born 1959, Tarija, Bolivia) is a Bolivian writer. A prolific author, Lema is best known for his novel La vida me duele sin vos which won the National Novel Award. Other works include:

- La huella es el olvido
- El hombro gordo de La Paz
- Los dios vacios del Raspa Rios
- Que te vaya como mereces

He is the creator of the fictional detective Santiago Blanco. In 2018, he contributed to the volume 11 escritores del Wilstermann celebrating the Wilstermann football club.

He received Bolivia's National Culture Award in 2014.
