= Ramón Rocha Monroy =

Bolivian writer (born 1950)

Ramón Rocha Monroy (born 1950, Cochabamba, Bolivia) is a Bolivian writer.

== Early life and education ==
He studied law at Higher University of San Simón (Universidad Mayor de San Simón) in Cochabamba, and did postgraduate studies at National Autonomous University of Mexico (Universidad Nacional Autónoma de México) in Mexico City.

== Career ==
He has been a journalist, a university professor and a politician, first with the Revolutionary Left Movement (Movimiento de Izquierda Revolucionaria) and then with the Movimiento al Socialismo.

As a writer, he is known for the 2002 historical novel Potosi 1600, which won the National Novel Award in Bolivia.
