= Barrage of Fire =

Novel by Óscar Cerruto

- Author: Óscar Cerruto
- Publication date: 1935

Barrage of Fire (Spanish: Aluvión de Fuego) is a novel written by Óscar Cerruto and published in 1935.

== Summary ==
Barrage of Fire recounts the cruel reality of Bolivian life during the Chaco War. The novel narrates the experiences of Mauricio Santa Cruz, a young man getting ready to go to war, whose expectations are turned around as he discovers the realities of a suffering nation, the great injustices being done to an entire people, and the ultimate reality of a nation engulfed in a flood of fire.

== Reviews ==
A critical review of the book can be found in the "Ibero-American Magazine" of the University of Pittsburgh ISSN 2154-4794
