= Óscar Cerruto =

Bolivian writer and diplomat (1912–1981)

- Born: 13 June 1912; La Paz, Bolivia
- Died: 10 April 1981 (aged 68); La Paz, Bolivia
- Occupation(s): Poet, novelist, short story writer, journalist, diplomat
- Notable work: Barrage of Fire

Óscar Cerruto (13 June 1912 – 10 April 1981) was a Bolivian poet, novelist, short story writer, journalist and diplomat.

== Biography ==
Cerruto was born in the city of La Paz in 1912. He wrote Barrage of Fire, named one of the greatest novels ever written in Bolivia.

Considered as one of the five most important Bolivian writers of the past century, Oscar Cerruto is the author of the main social novels published in Bolivia. His work not only includes literature, but also Journalism as well as Spanish grammar studies.

Cerruto died in La Paz in 1981.
