= María Josefa Mujía =

Bolivian poet

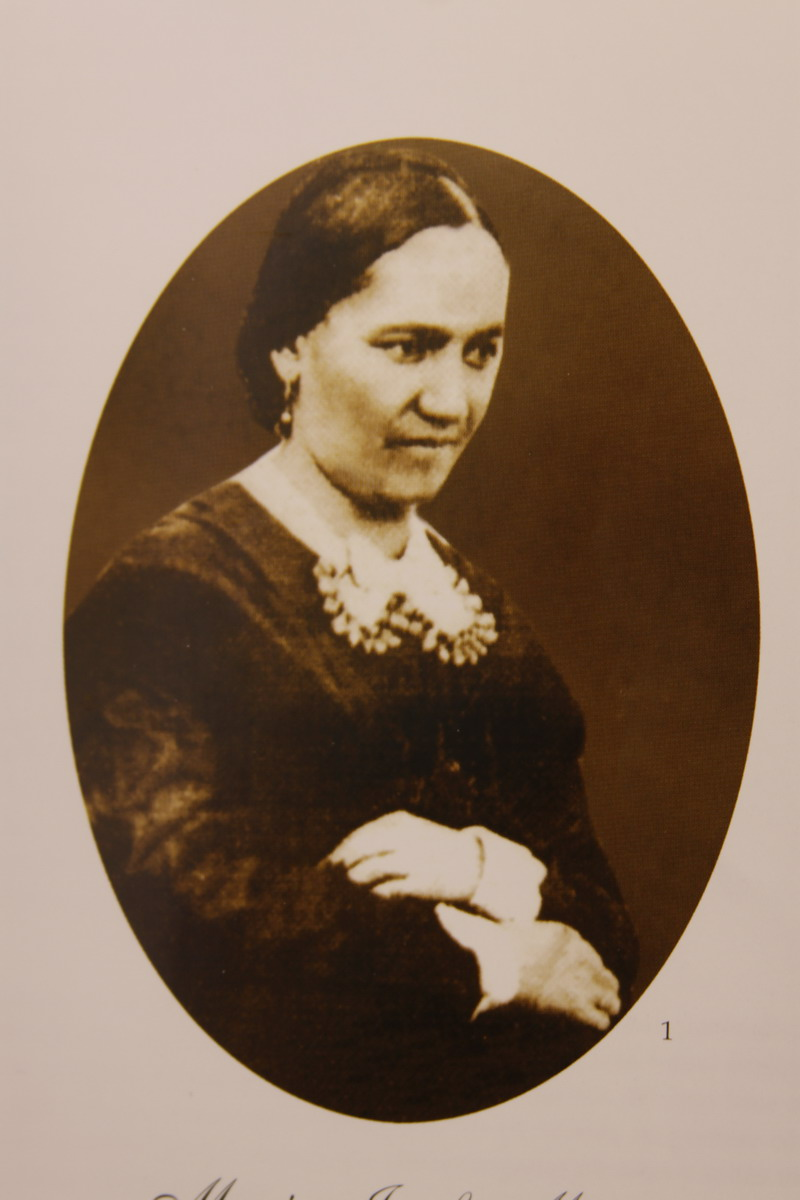
- Born: 1812
- Died: 1888 (aged 75–76)
- Occupation: Poet
- Writing career
- Language: Spanish
- Genre: Romantic

María Josefa Mujía (1812–1888) was a Bolivian poet. Blind from the age of 14, she was one of Bolivia's first Romantic poets and is considered the country's first woman writer following its independence. Her poetry was lauded for its sincerity and lyricism, while its dark and sorrowful content earned her the moniker "la Alondra del dolor" (the "Lark of pain").

== Biography ==
María Josefa Catalina Estrada Mujía was born in Sucre in 1812 to Miguel Mujía and Andrea Estrada. She grew up during the Bolivian War of Independence (1809–1825) and was the eldest of six brothers. Her early education included Spanish literary classics and the writings of Pedro Calderón de la Barca. Following the death of her father, she became blind at the age of 14. She later underwent eye surgery, to no avail.

Her brother Augustus spent afternoons reading religious and literary works to her. He also wrote letters for her and transcribed her poetry. Though she made him promise to keep her works secret, he taught her poem "La ciega" ("Blind Woman") to a friend. It was then published in the Eco de la Opinión newspaper in 1850 and became one of Mujía's most celebrated poems. According to Gabriel René Moreno, after this she participated in a national competition to compose an inscription for the tomb of Simón Bolívar.

Mujía had depression following the death of Augustus in 1854. Her mother and two of her other brothers died as well. She ceased composing poetry for a time until her nephew Ricardo Mujía took on the role of transcribing and disseminating her verse. He later remarked on the improvisational nature of her poems, recounting that they were never revised or corrected.

Mujía died in Sucre on 30 July 1888.

== Works ==
Mujía authored over 320 poems and wrote a novel. She translated Italian and French works, including those by Alphonse de Lamartine and Victor Hugo. Her compositions were printed in magazines and newspapers such as El Cruzado. She is considered the first woman writer of Bolivia after its independence and was one of the country's first Romantic poets. Alongside minor poets Néstor Galindo, Ricardo José Bustamante, and Manuel José Tovar, she formed the foundation of Bolivian Romanticism.

Mujía's personal and sorrowful style of poetry draws on her own blindness. Her melancholic verses betray a deep pessimism and due to the tragic character of her verse, she was referred to as "la Alondra del dolor" (the "Lark of pain").

Enrique Finot, in his Historia de la Literatura Boliviana, described her work as being impregnated with a profound sincerity and having a charming simplicity of form. In praise of her poem "Arbol de la esperanza", Spanish literary critic Marcelino Menéndez y Pelayo wrote that her verses had more intimacy of lyrical feeling than anything else in the Parnasso Boliviano.

Her body of work was collected by Gustavo Jordán Ríos in 2009 into María Josefa Mujía: Obra Completa.
