= Raúl Botelho Gosálvez =

Bolivian writer

Raúl Botelho Gosálvez (1917–2004) was a Bolivian writer. Trained in law, he published his first novel Borrachera verde at the age of 20. This won the Primer Premio de Literatura Nacional award in 1937, and went through a record number of reissues. He is also known for his novel Altiplano set in the Andean highlands. In all, he wrote more than a dozen books.

== Selected works ==
- Gosálvez, Raúl Botelho (1938). Borrachera verde: (motivos benianos) (in Spanish).
- Gosálvez, Raúl Botelho (1941). Coca: (motivos del Yunga paceño) (in Spanish)
- Gosálvez, Raúl Botelho (1957). Tierra chúcara (in Spanish)
- Gosálvez, Raúl Botelho (1948). Potosí colonial: historia y fantasía : (Conferencia dictada en el Paraninfo de la Universidad de Montevideo, con lo auspicios de la Asociación Internacional de Prensa) (in Spanish)
- Gosálvez, Raúl Botelho (2005). El corregidor Miguel de Cervantes en La Paz y otros textos (in Spanish)
