= Javier del Granado =

Francisco Javier del Granado y Granado
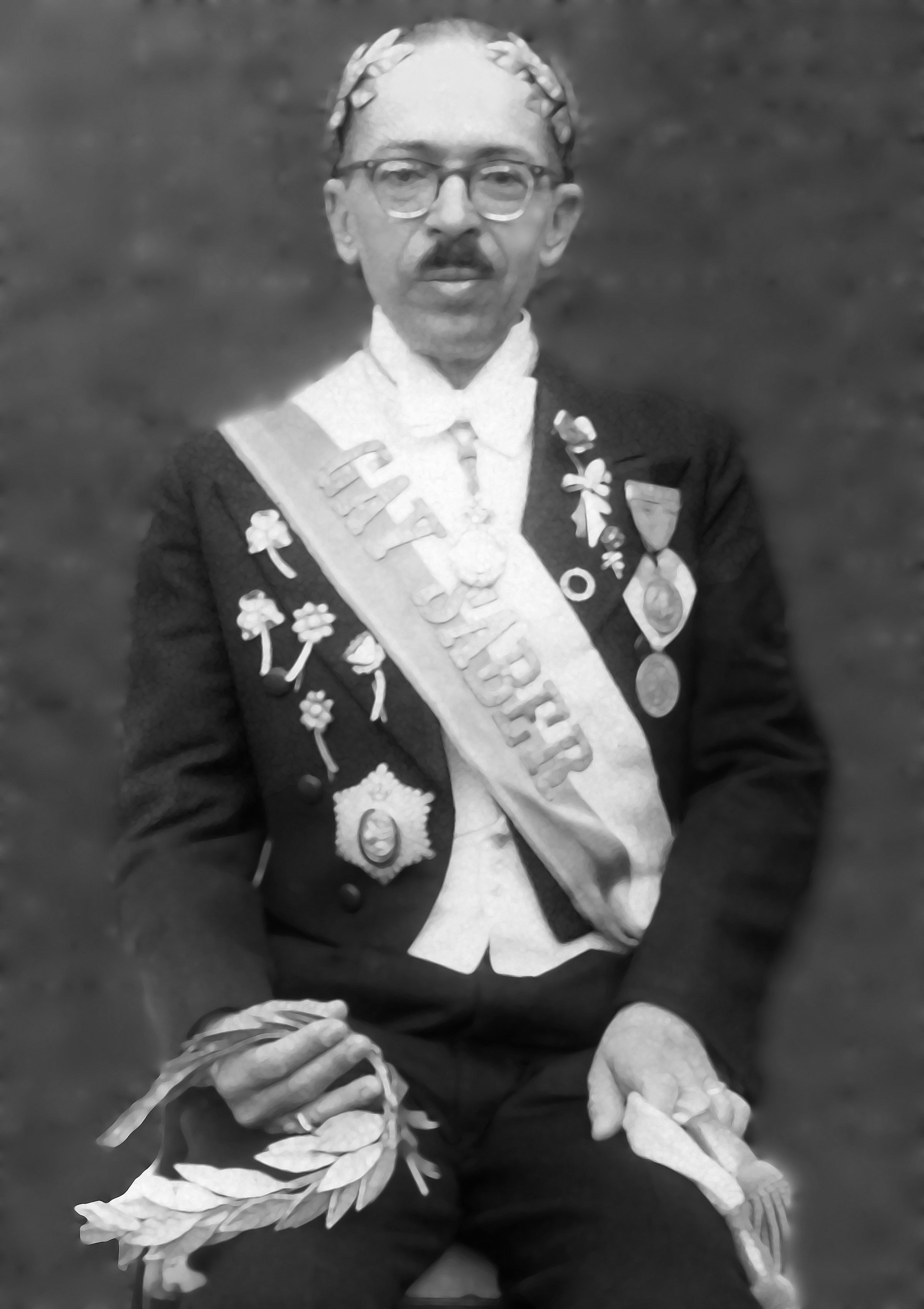
- Born: 27 February 1913; Cochabamba, Cercado Province (Cochabamba), Bolivia
- Died: 15 May 1996 (aged 83); Cochabamba, Cercado Province (Cochabamba), Bolivia
- Occupations: poet laureate, Favorite Son of Bolivia

Don Francisco Javier del Granado y Granado (27 February 1913 – 15 May 1996), was a poet laureate and favorite son of Bolivia.

== Biography ==
Born into an aristocratic family with a rich literary pedigree, he spent most of his youth on his family's hacienda near Arani, in the department of Cochabamba, Colpa-Ciaco, a colonial-era estate in existence since the 16th century. A quiet life filled with the joys of living in the countryside greatly influenced his works, which combine epic imagery and storytelling with bucolic settings as well as rural and indigenous themes and the use, in addition to Spanish, of indigenous languages, primarily Quechua (the language of the Incas). In its turn toward native subjects as well as in its use of a formal battery of traditional forms, such as the ballad and the sonnet, his extensive body of poetry has been compared with that of Mexico's preeminent man of letters Alfonso Reyes.

Bolivia's leading poetic light achieved widespread acclaim and recognition, receiving a multitude of national and international awards over a career that spanned more than half a century. His death was marked by three national days of mourning, and his funeral was a state event. Bolivia has dedicated a plaza and two avenues (one of them, La Paz's longest boulevard) in his honour, and put up a monument to his memory.

== Poet of the Bolivian Revolution ==
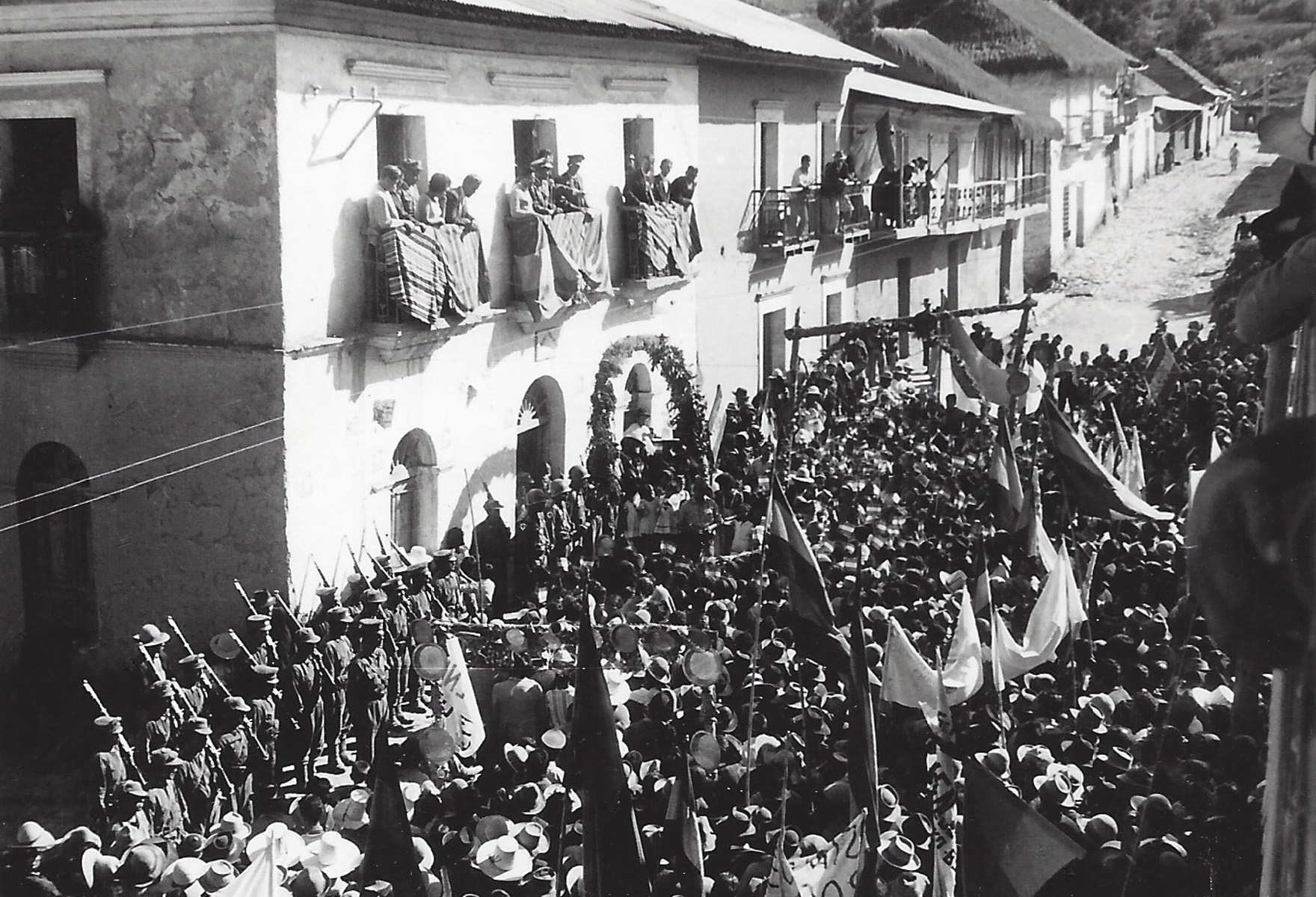
A massive peasant rally held in Arani, a rural municipality in the Upper Valley of Cochabamba, with Paz Estenssoro in 1942

Along with Víctor Paz Estenssoro and others, del Granado formed the Movimiento Nacionalista Revolucionario. The MNR was at the forefront of the Bolivian Revolution of 1952, which radically changed the country, bringing about land redistribution, universal suffrage, and nationalization of the major tin mines.

== Granado family ==
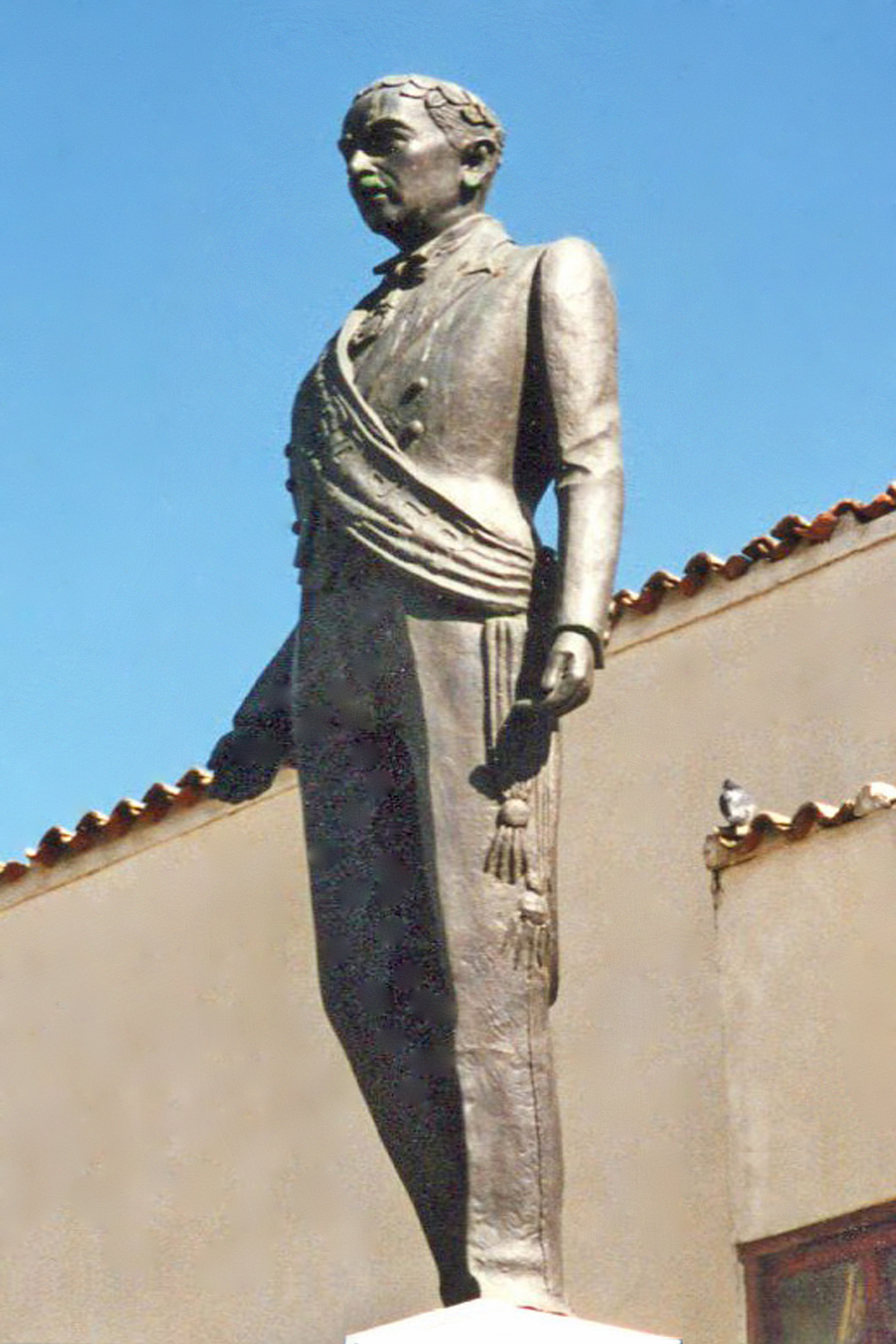
"Monument to the poet", a work by the artist César Terrazas Pardo, on its pedestal in the Plaza del Granado, before being moved to Javier del Granado Avenue in Cochabamba

He comes from a literary family that traces its roots back in colonial America to that outstanding humanitarian figure who was the Count of Cotoca. His father, Félix del Granado, a notable writer in his own right and rector of the University of San Simón, founded the Bolivian Academies of Language and History. His uncle, the Venerable Francisco María del Granado, a man of deep compassion and a deeply spiritual and holy bishop, was also a gifted orator and writer; particularly dedicated in his concern and love for the poor and Native Americans, he was instrumental in steering the Catholic Church amid a critical era of anticlerical persecution during the 19th century. Bolivian human-rights lawyer Juan del Granado is also a member of this family.

== Bibliography ==
The major collections of his poems are:

- Rosas pálidas (1939)
- Canciones de la tierra (1945)
- Santa Cruz de la Sierra (1947)
- Cochabamba (1959)
- Romance del valle nuestro (1964)
- La parábola del águila (1967)
- Antología poética de la flor natural (1970)
- Terruño (1971)
- Estampas (1975)
- Vuelo de Azores (1980)
- Canto al paisaje de Bolivia (1982)
- Cantares (1992)

== Sources ==
Caceres Romero, Adolfo, Diccionario de la Literatura Boliviana, Second Edition, La Paz, 1997
