= Academia Boliviana de la Lengua =

Academic association

The Academia Boliviana de la Lengua (Spanish for Bolivian Academy of Language) is an association of academics and experts on the use of the Spanish language in Bolivia. It is a member of the Association of Spanish Language Academies.

The academy was founded in La Paz on August 25, 1927, by a group of linguists and writers, including Víctor Muñoz Reyes (the minister of industry and finance at the time) and Francisco Iraizós y Rosendo Villalobos (named as the academy's first director). Other founding members included Hernando Siles (Bolivia's president at the time), Félix del Granado (the father of the future poet laureate and influential academic Javier del Granado), Ricardo Mujía, and Florián Zambrana. Other distinguished members throughout the academy's history include Enrique Kempff Mercado and Porfirio Díaz Machicao, who also served as director from 1957 to 1975.

== See also ==
- Bolivian literature
- Royal Spanish Academy
- Association of Spanish Language Academies
