= Jesús Lara (writer) =

Jesús Lara Lara (January 1, 1898 - September 6, 1980) was a Bolivian writer, poet, novelist, linguist, indigenist, journalist and politician. He was a member of the Unión Nacional de Poetas y Escritores de Cochabamba.

== Biography ==
Born in Muela (now Villa Rivero), Cochabamba, Lara attended primary school there and secondary school in the city of Cochabamba. During the Chaco War with Paraguay he fought on the front lines, an experience that would mark the rest of his life. He was imprisoned several times for his activities as a member of the Communist Party. In 1956 he was the Party’s candidate for Vice President of Bolivia.

Lara’s literary work, which deals mainly with the social problems of indigenous people, earned him numerous prizes and distinctions, including an honorary doctorate from the University of San Simón de Cochabamba in 1979.
