= Carlos Medinaceli =

Bolivian writer and intellectual

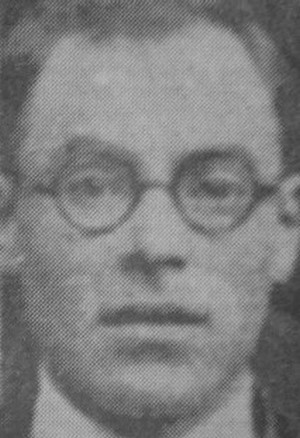

Senator of the National Convention for Potosí
- In office 23 May 1938 – 24 April 1939

Personal details
- Born: 1899
- Died: 1949
- Political party: Popular Front of Potosí

Carlos Medinaceli (1899–1949) was a Bolivian writer and intellectual. His 1947 novel La chaskañawi (la de los ojos de estrella) deals with sexual entanglements between "cholas" and Criollo people.

== Selected works ==
- Medinaceli, Carlos (1955). Páginas de vida (in Spanish). Editorial "Potosí,".
- Medinaceli, Carlos (1942). La educación del gusto estético (in Spanish). Universidad de San Francisco Xavier.
- Medinaceli, Carlos (1947). La Chaskañawi: (novela de costumbres bolivianas) (in Spanish). Fundación Universitaria "Simón I. Patiño".
- Medinaceli, Carlos (1963). Dialogos Y Cuentos de Mi Paisaje. Empresa Editora "Universo".
- Carlos Medinaceli escoge: la prosa novecentista en Bolivia; antología crítica (in Spanish). Editorial "Los Amigos del Libro, ". 1967.
- Medinaceli, Carlos (1968). Apuntes sobre el arte de la biografía (in Spanish). J. Camarlinghi.
- Medinaceli, Carlos (1972). La inactualidad de Alcides Arguedas y otros estudios biográficos (in Spanish). Editorial "Los Amigos del Libro,".
- Medinaceli, Carlos (1972). El huayralevismo: o, La enseñanza universitaria en Bolivia (in Spanish). Editorial "Los Amigos de Libro".
- Medinaceli, Carlos (1975). La reivindicación de la cultura americana (in Spanish). Editorial Los Amigos del Libro.
- Medinaceli, Carlos (2021). Ensayos reunidos: (1915-1930) (in Spanish). Plural Editores. ISBN 978-9917-605-27-0.
