= Augusto Guzmán =

Bolivian writer and historian

- Born: 1 September 1903; Totora, Cochabamba, Bolivia
- Died: 24 December 1994 (aged 91); Cochabamba, Bolivia
- Occupations: Writer, historian, soldier
- Notable work: La sima fecunda (1933), Prisionero de Guerra (1937), Bellacos y paladines (1964)

Augusto Guzmán Martínez (1 September 1903 – 24 December 1994) was a Bolivian writer and historian. He was a soldier during the Chaco War (1932–1935). He wrote three novels, La sima fecunda (1933), Prisionero de Guerra (1937) and Bellacos y paladines (1964). The first two novels are considered among the best novels in Bolivian literature. One of his short stories "La cruel Martina" was adapted into a film by John Miranda.

He taught at the Universities of Cochabamba and San Andrés de La Paz. For his services to literature, he was awarded the National Literature Prize of Bolivia. He was also elected a member of the National Academy of History and the National Academy of Letters. He died in 1994.
