= Biblioteca del Bicentenario de Bolivia =

Series of books on Bolivian history

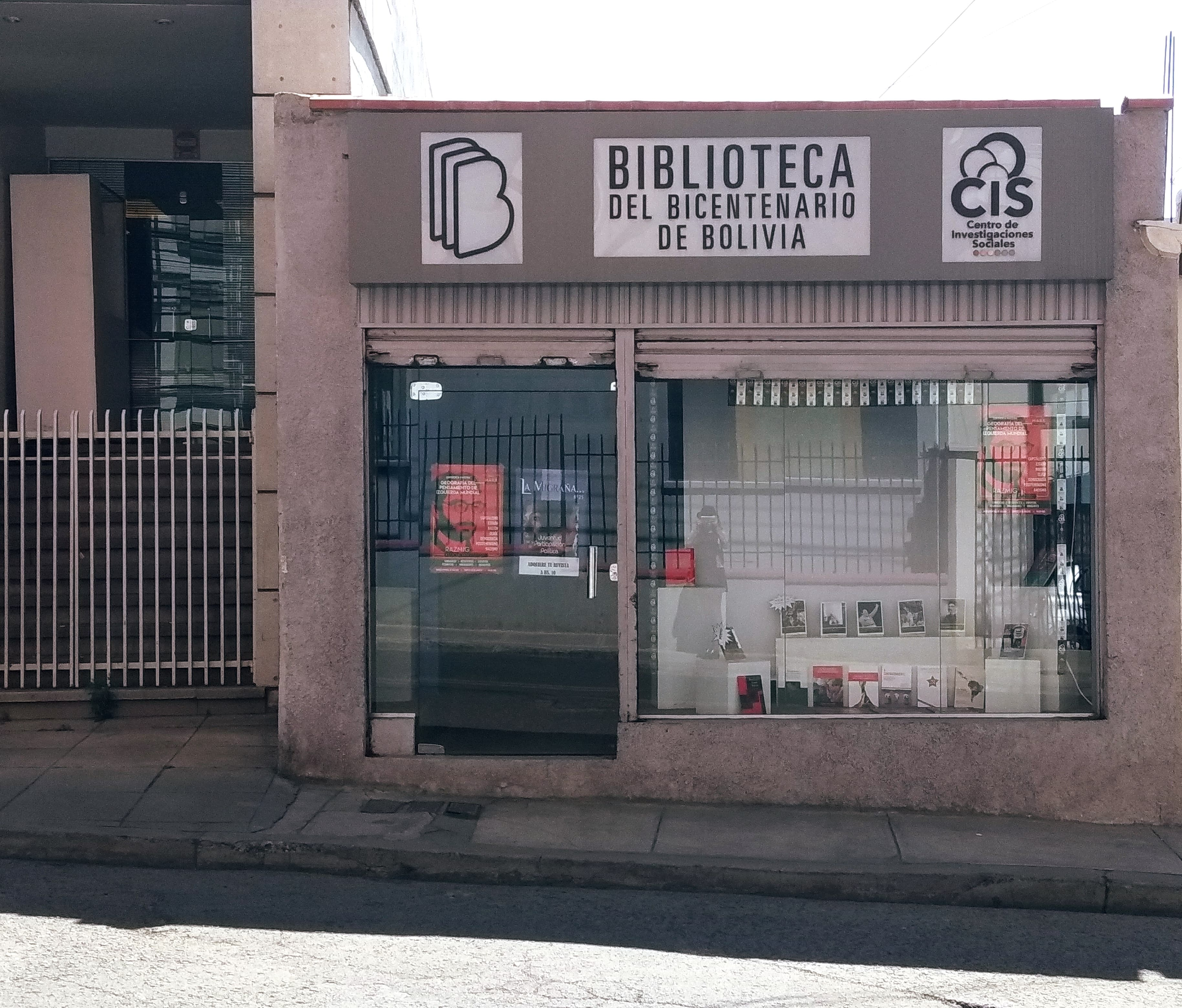
Store of the Bicentennial Library of Bolivia (BBB) and the Center for Social Research (CIS) in the city of La Paz, Bolivia

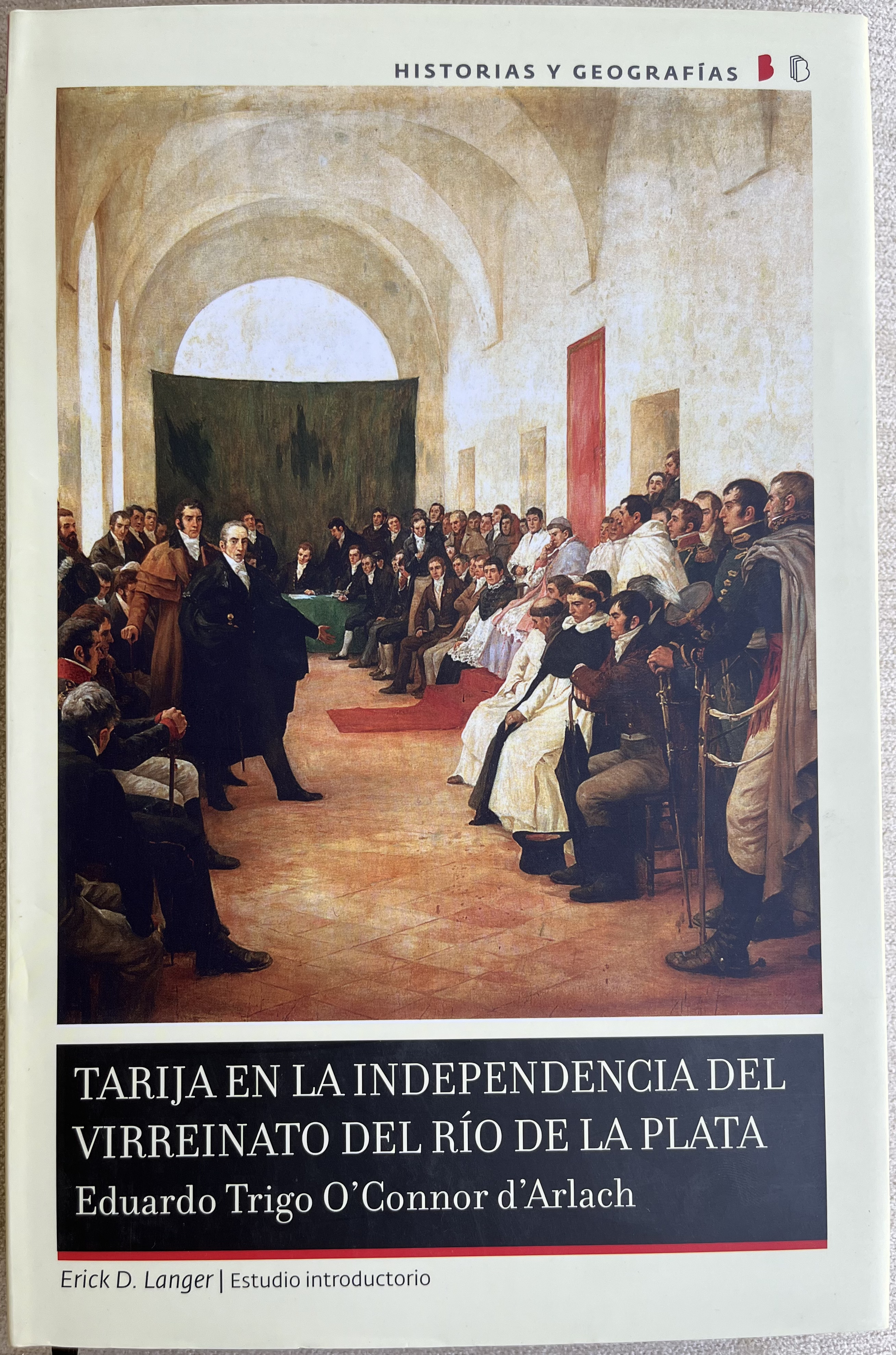
Tarija en la independencia del Virreinato del Río de la Plata (BBB)

Biblioteca del Bicentenario de Bolivia (BBB; “Bicentennial Library of Bolivia”) is a large-scale historical book series on Bolivian history, published by the Centro de Investigaciones Sociales (CIS; "Center for Social Research") of the Vice Presidency of the Plurinational State of Bolivia.

This series contains around 200 volumes, comprising representative works on the history, society, culture, and other aspects of Bolivia. It was compiled to commemorate the 200th anniversary of Bolivia’s independence (2025). The collection covers approximately 400 years of historical research and publications about Bolivia and is thematically divided into four groups: History and Geography (69 titles), Literature and Arts (72 titles), Society (49 titles), and Dictionaries and Compendiums (10 titles).

== Overview ==
Only a part of the volumes has been published so far.

No.	Title	Author
1	Bolivia en el primer centenario de su independencia [Bolivia in the first century of its independence]	Alarcón A., J. Ricardo
2	La cara india y campesina de nuestra historia [The Indigenous and Peasant Face of Our History]	Albó, Xavier y Barnadas, Josep
3	Informe sobre Bolivia (1827); Anónimo: Bosquejo del estado en que se halla la riqueza nacional de Bolivia; (libro fusionado) [Report on Bolivia (1827); Anonymous: 'Outline of the State of National Wealth in Bolivia' (merged book)]	Pentland, Joseph B
4	Relación histórica de las Misiones Franciscanas de Apolobamba [Historical Account of the Franciscan Missions of Apolobamba]	Armentia, Nicolás
5	Historia de la Villa Imperial de Potosí	Arzáns de Orsúa y Vela, Bartolomé
6	Participación popular en la Independencia de Bolivia	Arze Aguirre, René
7	Mineros de la montaña roja. El trabajo de los indios en Potosí	Mitre, Antonio
8	Los patriarcas de la plata	Tandeter, Enrique
9	Coacción y mercado. La minería de la plata en el Potosí colonial, 1692-1826 (libro fusionado)	Bakewell, Peter
10	Cartas para comprender la historia de Bolivia	Baptista Gumucio, Mariano
11	Charcas. Orígenes históricos de una sociedad colonial	Barnadas, Josep
12	Espacio urbano y dinámica étnica. La Paz en el siglo xix	Barragán, Rossana
13	La cultura reduccional de los llanos de Mojos	Block, David
14	La provincia de Atacama	Cajías, Fernando
15	Crónica moralizada	Calancha, Antonio
16	La masacre de Jesús de Machaqa	Choque, Roberto
17	Si me permiten hablar...	Chungara, Domitila (Moema Viezzer)
18	Siringa. Memorias de un colonizador del Beni ; Pinto Parada, Rodolfo: Arreando desde Mojos (libro fusionado)	Coímbra, Juan
19	Etno-historias del Isoso. Chané y chiriguanos en el Chaco boliviano	Combès, Isabelle
20	Zárate, el “temible” Willka	Condarco, Ramiro
21	El escribano de los caciques apoderados; Taraqu, 1866-1935: Masacre, guerra y renovación en la biografía de Eduardo L. Nina Qhispi; El indio Santos Marka T’ula… (libro fusionado)	Condori, Leandro; Mamani, Carlos y thoa
22	Esclavos negros en Bolivia; Inge Buisson-Wolff: Negerklavereiundnegerhandel in Hochperu 1545-1640 [Esclavitud y tráfico de negros en Alto Perú] (libro fusionado)	Crespo, Alberto
23	Bosquejo estadístico de Bolivia	Dalence, José María
24	Moxos: Descripciones e historia fiel de los indios, animales e plantas de la provincia de Moxos en el virreinato del Perú	De Ribera, Lázaro
25	Descripción geográfica y estadística de Santa Cruz de la Sierra; Comajuncosa, Antonio; Hanke, Tadeo y La Cueva, Francisco: Otros (libro fusionado)	De Viedma, Francisco
26	Historia de la rebelión de Túpac Catari	Del Valle, María Eugenia
27	Viajes por Bolivia	D’ Orbigny, Alcide
28	Rebelión en las venas	Dunkerley, James
29	Historia diplomática de Bolivia	Escobari, Jorge
30	Historia de la conquista del oriente boliviano; García Recio, José María: Análisis de una sociedad de frontera: Santa Cruz de la Sierra en los siglos XVI-XII (libro fusionado)	Finot, Enrique
31	Amazonia norte de Bolivia: economía gomera (1870-1940)	Gamarra, Pilar
32	Diario del Che en Bolivia	Guevara, Ernesto
33	“A bala, piedra y palo”: La construcción de la ciudadanía política en Bolivia	Irurozqui, Marta
34	Orígenes de la revolución nacional boliviana	Klein, Herbert
35	Colonialismo y transformación agraria en Bolivia: Cochabamba 1550-1900	Larson, Brooke
36	La Presidencia de Sucre en Bolivia	Lofstrom, William
37	Historia del movimiento obrero	Lora, Guillermo
38	Obra reunida	Mendoza, Gunnar
39	El Macizo Boliviano y El factor geográfico en la nacionalidad boliviana	Mendoza, Jaime
40	Álbum de paisajes, tipos humanos y costumbres de Bolivia (1841-1869)	Mercado, Melchor María
41	Geografía y recursos naturales de Bolivia	Montes de Oca, Ismael
42	Últimos días coloniales en el Alto Perú	Moreno, Gabriel René
43	Andrés de Santa Cruz y la Confederación Perú-Boliviana	Parkerson, Phillip
44	Tawantinsuyo	Pärssinen, Martti
45	Estado boliviano y ayllu andino. Tierra y tributo en el Norte de Potosí	Platt, Tristan
46	Qaraqara-Charka	Platt, Tristan; Harris, Olivia y Bouysse-Cassagne, Thérèse
47	Nueva corónica y buen gobierno	Guamán Poma de Ayala, Felipe
48	Guano, salitre y sangre. Historia de la Guerra del Pacífico	Querejazu, Roberto
49	Masamaclay: Historia política, diplomática y militar de la Guerra del Chaco	Querejazu, Roberto
50	Ni con Lima ni con Buenos Aires. La formación de un Estado nacional en Charcas	Roca, José Luis
51	Teoponte, la otra guerrilla guevarista en Bolivia	Rodríguez, Gustavo
52	Obra reunida (En busca de El Dorado; Apiaguaiqui Tumpa. Biografía del pueblo chiriguano y su último caudillo; Breve historia de Santa Cruz)	Sanabria, Hernando
53	Revolución en los Andes. La era de Túpac Amaru	Serulnikov, Sergi
54	El complejo proceso hacia la independencia de Charcas	Soux, María Luisa
55	Anotaciones y documentos sobre la campaña del Alto Acre, 1902-1903	Suárez, Nicolás
56	Cuando solo reinasen los indios. La política aymara en la era de la insurgencia	Thomson, Sinclair
57	Tarija en la independencia del Virreinato del Río de la Plata	Trigo, Eduardo
58	Diario de un comandante de la Guerra de la Independencia	Vargas, José Santos
59	Obra reunida	Vázquez Machicado, Humberto
60	El regreso de los antepasados. Los indios urus de Bolivia del siglo xx al xvi. Ensayo de historia regresiva	Wachtel, Nathan
61	Antología de arqueología	
62	Antología de biografías	
63	Antología de ciencias de la tierra	
64	Antología de cronistas coloniales de Charcas	
65	Antología de diarios de viajes y expediciones	Lema Garrett, Ana María
66	Antología de documentos fundamentales históricos de Bolivia	Arze, José Roberto
67	Antología de estudios regionales	
68	Antología de folletos	
69	Antología de la problemática marítima	
70	Atlas general e histórico de Bolivia	
71	Nueva historia general de Bolivia	
72	Juan de la Rosa	Aguirre, Nataniel
73	Obra reunida	Alfaro, Óscar
74	Ensayos escogidos	Antezana J., Luis H
75	Raza de bronce	Arguedas, Alcides
76	Obra reunida	Bascopé Aspiazu, René
77	Obra reunida	Bedregal, Yolanda
78	El Loco	Borda, Arturo
79	Obra reunida	Camargo, Edmundo
80	Periférica Blvd.	Cárdenas, Adolfo
81	Obra reunida (dos volúmenes)	Cerruto, Óscar
82	Sangre de mestizos	Céspedes, Augusto
83	Obra reunida	Chirveches, Armando
84	El embrujo del oro	Costa du Rels, Adolfo
85	Matías, el apóstol suplente	De la Vega, Julio
86	Poesía completa	Echazú, Roberto
87	Bolivia: 150 grabados en cobre	Gerstmann, Roberto
88	Historia del arte en Bolivia	Gisbert, Teresa y Mesa, José
89	Iconografía y mitos indígenas en el arte	Gisbert, Teresa
90	Historia del cine boliviano	Gumucio, Alfonso
91	Obra reunida	Guzmán, Augusto
92	Obra reunida	Jaimes Freyre, Ricardo
93	Yanacuna (Yawarninchij)	Lara, Jesús
94	La Chaskañawi	Medinaceli, Carlos
95	Obra reunida	Medinaceli, Carlos
96	Obra reunida	Mitre, Eduardo
97	Jonás y la ballena rosada	Montes, Wolfango
98	Obra reunida	Moreno, Gabriel René
99	Obra reunida	Mundy, Hilda
100	Obra reunida	Otero Reiche, Raúl
101	Río fugitivo	Paz Soldán, Edmundo
102	Bolivia: los caminos de la escultura	Pentimali, Michella; Gisbert, Teresa; Paz, Valeria; Calatayud, Jacqueline
103	Cuando Sara Chura despierte	Piñeiro, Juan Pablo
104	Interior mina	Poppe, René
105	Los deshabitados	Quiroga Santa Cruz, Marcelo
106	Las misiones jesuíticas de Chiquitos	Querejazu, Pedro
107	Pintura boliviana en el siglo xx	Querejazu, Pedro
108	Obra reunida	Reynolds, Gregorio
109	El run run de la calavera	Rocha Monroy, Ramón
110	Felipe Delgado	Saenz, Jaime
111	Obra reunida	Saenz, Jaime
112	La pintura contemporánea en Bolivia	Salazar Mostajo, Carlos
113	Literatura contemporánea y grotesco social en Bolivia	Sanjinés, Javier
114	Obra reunida	Shimose, Pedro
115	Añejerías paceñas	Sotomayor, Ismael
116	De cuando en cuando Saturnina	Spedding, Alison
117	Obra reunida	Suárez, Jorge
118	Obra reunida	Suárez Araúz, Nicomedes
119	Obra reunida (dos volúmenes)	Tamayo, Franz
120	Obra reunida	Terán Cabero, Antonio
121	Obra reunida (dos volúmenes)	Urzagasti, Jesús
122	Obra reunida	Vaca Guzmán, Santiago
123	Cuando vibraba la entraña de plata	Viaña, José Enrique
124	Mineros	Wicky, Jean Claude: Bolivia
125	Hacia una historia crítica de la literatura en Bolivia	Wiethüchter, Blanca y Paz Soldán, Alba María
126	Obra reunida	Wiethüchter, Blanca
127	Obra reunida	Zamudio, Adela
128	Antología de la arquitectura en Bolivia	
129	Antología de la caricatura en Bolivia	
130	Antología de crónica literaria y periodística	
131	Antología del cuento boliviano	
132	Antología de la crítica y del ensayo literarios en Bolivia	Souza, Mauricio
133	Antología de fotografía boliviana	
134	Antología de gastronomía boliviana	Rossells, Beatriz
135	Antología de literatura aymara	
136	Antología de literatura colonial	
137	Antología de literatura infantil y juvenil Bolivia	
138	Antología de literatura quechua	
139	Antología de literatura tierras bajas	
140	Antología sobre la música en Bolivia	
141	Antología de poesía boliviana	
142	Antología de tradición oral en Bolivia	
143	Antología de teatro boliviano	
144	Sociología boliviana contemporánea	Albarracín, Juan
145	Obra reunida	Albó, Xavier
146	Obra reunida	Almaraz, Sergio
147	El manuscrito de Huarochirí	Anónimo
148	Pueblo enfermo	Arguedas, Alcides
149	Obra reunida	Arze, José Antonio
150	Páginas escogidas	Baptista Caserta, Mariano
151	Tres reflexiones sobre el pensamiento andino	Bouysse-Cassagne, Thérèse; Harris, Olivia; Platt, Tristan y Cereceda, Verónica
152	Compendio de etnias indígenas y ecorregiones Amazonia, oriente y Chaco	Díez Astete, Álvaro
153	Obra reunida	Francovich, Guillermo
154	Unas fotografías para dar a conocer al mundo la civilización de la república guaraya	García Jordán, Pilar
155	Obra reunida	García Linera, Álvaro
156	Historia natural, etnográfica, geográfica, lingüística del Chaco boliviano	Gianecchini, Doroteo
157	Warisata, la escuela ayllu; Utama (libro fusionado)	Guillén-Peñaranda y Pérez, Elizardo
158	Nómadas del arco largo: los sirionó del oriente boliviano; No más nómadas (libro fusionado)	Holmberg, Allan y Stearman, Allyn
159	El katarismo	Hurtado, Javier
160	Compendio de historia eclesiástica de Bolivia; La Iglesia Católica en Bolivia (libro fusionado)	López Menéndez, Felipe y Barnadas, Josep
161	Obra reunida	Marof, Tristan
162	Nacionalismo y coloniaje	Montenegro, Carlos
163	Formaciones económicas y políticas del mundo andino	Murra, John
164	Sobre el problema nacional y colonial de Bolivia	Ovando, Jorge
165	Obra reunida	Quiroga Santa Cruz, Marcelo
166	La revolución india	Reinaga, Fausto
167	Historia social del indio boliviano. “El pongueaje”	Reyeros, Rafael
168	Obra reunida	Riester, Jürgen
169	Oprimidos pero no vencidos	Rivera, Silvia
170	Obra reunida	Romero Pittari, Salvador
171	Obra reunida	Saignes, Thierry
172	Obra reunida	Urquidi, Arturo
173	Obra reunida	Van den Berg, Hans
174	La lengua de Adán	Villamil de Rada, Emeterio
175	Obra reunida	Zavaleta Mercado, René
176	Antología de antropología de tierras altas	
177	Antología de antropología de tierras bajas	
178	Antología de ciencias políticas bolivianas	Mayorga, Fernando
179	Antología de ciencias de la vida	
180	Antología sobre ciudad, mestizaje y economía popular	
181	Antología del deporte boliviano	
182	Antología de economía en Bolivia	
183	Antología de educación en Bolivia	
184	Antología de farmacopea indígena	
185	Antología de filosofía boliviana	
186	Antología sobre las Fuerzas Armadas y la Policía	
187	Antología sobre la hoja de coca	Spedding Pallet, Alison
188	Antología sobre el minero y la minería en Bolivia	
189	Antología del periodismo y estudios de comunicación	
190	Antología de sociología boliviana	
191	Antología de tradiciones, folklore y mitos	
192	Antología sobre textiles	
193	Diccionario histórico de Bolivia	Barnadas, Josep
194	Vocabulario de la lengua aymara	Bertonio, Ludovico
195	Diccionario de bolivianismos	Coello, Carlos
196	Diccionario chiriguano-español, español-chiriguano	Gianecchini, Doroteo
197	Vocabulario de la lengua general de todo el Perú	Gonzales Holguín, Diego
198	Diccionario quechua	Herrero, Joaquín y Sánchez, Federico
199	Diccionario aymara	Layme, Félix
200	Diccionario de lengua mojeña	Marbán, Pedro

== See also ==
- Anexo:Obras de la Biblioteca del Bicentenario de Bolivia (Spanish)
- Anexo:Comité Editorial de la Biblioteca del Bicentenario de Bolivia (Spanish)
- Centenario de Bolivia (Spanish)
- Biblioteca de la Presidencia de Colombia
