= 1969 Bolivian coup d'état =

Military coup in Bolivia

Date	September 26, 1969
Location	Bolivia
Status	Siles Salinas overthrown

Belligerents
(Bolivia) Bolivian government	(Bolivia) Bolivian Army

Commanders and leaders
(Bolivia) Luís Adolfo Siles Salinas	(Bolivia) Alfredo Ovando Candía (Bolivia) Juan José Torres

1969 Bolivian coup d'état (also known as the 26 September Revolution by supporters) was a military coup carried out by the Bolivian commander Alfredo Ovando Candía that deposed President Luís Adolfo Siles Salinas, former vice-president of René Barrientos who had taken office after his death. Ovando seized power in the name of a "nationalist and revolutionary" program formulated in the Revolutionary Mandate of the Armed Forces. Ovando's coup belonged to a trend of military regimes of nationalist and progressive orientation in Latin America, represented by Juan Velasco Alvarado and Omar Torrijos Herrera.

== Context ==
=== 1964 coup and military polarization ===
On November 4, 1964, generals René Barrientos Ortuño and Alfredo Ovando Candía overthrew Víctor Paz Estenssoro and formed a military junta. Ovando was the key actor of the coup and aspired to become president, but Barrientos emerged as the new ruler due to his popularity. In May 1965, the Barrientos-Ovando co-presidency was created by the governing junta, with the objective of containing discontent and division in the Armed Forces. In 1966, Barrientos resigned from the junta and ran for election on a ticket with the civilian Luis Siles Salinas, which he won and assumed the new government with Siles Salinas as his vice president.

At this time, two military currents prevailed in the Armed Forces, the conservative line, linked to the repression of the Ñancahuazú Guerrilla and represented by Barrientos and the institutionalist line, linked to the ideals of the 1952 Revolution and represented by Ovando.

=== Presidency of Siles Salinas ===
On April 27, 1969, President Barrientos died in a controversial helicopter crash. His vice president, civilian Siles Salinas, took office in accordance with the Constitution and received approval from the High Command. For his part, Ovando was absent because his wife was having surgery at a clinic in the United States When he was informed of Barrientos' death, Ovando returned to La Paz and accepted the inauguration of Siles Salinas. The civilian government of Siles Salinas was born without any solid political base and lacked independence from the Armed Forces, which limited much of the president's actions.

This period was full of tensions between the government and commander Ovando Candía. A new guerrilla focus was born in Bolivia, the so-called Teoponte Guerrilla carried out several attacks, a situation that would lead Commander Ovando Candía to accuse President Siles Salinas of leading a weak government.

Elections were promised for 1970. Ovando ran for these elections, supported by peasants through the Peasant Military Pact and military personnel close to him. The popular mayor of La Paz and also a military man Armando Escobar Uría also ran.

On September 19, FSB deputy Ambrosio García Rivera made an accusation in the Bolivian Parliament. According to García, General Ovando Candía had received $600,000 from the Gulf Oil Company to finance his presidential campaign. In response to the serious accusation, Ovando resigned as commander to enable an investigation, reaffirming his position - his resignation was refused by the president. Peasant protests arose in Oruro and Cochabamba demanding the resignation of Siles Salinas.

Faced with the possibility of losing the elections, Ovando chose to take power by force. Prior to this action, it is believed that Ovando had studied the Peruvian military regime headed by Juan Velasco Alvarado, admiring his authoritarian and nationalist model.

== Coup ==
On September 26, the Armed Forces junta carried out a military coup. The events were peaceful and there were few shots fired, with the Government Palace, the Municipal Mayor's Office and other state offices being taken over. The Armed Forces assumed power through the proclamation of a document called Revolutionary Mandate of the Armed Forces. Siles Salinas, who was visiting Santa Cruz de la Sierra, was sent into exile boarding a plane to Arica, Chile. Army justified their takeover of power to "avoid the danger of anarchy, capitulation and disorder."

The revolutionary junta appointed Alfredo Ovando Candía as President of the Republic and Juan José Torres as Commander of the Armed Forces. A civic-military cabinet was formed that contained figures from nationalist, progressive and right-wing positions. Ovando's cabinet was surrounded by intellectuals, among them Marcelo Quiroga Santa Cruz. The first decisions of Ovando, now President of the Revolutionary Government, were to cancel the 1970 elections and invalidate the oil statute.

There was no resistance to the coup, which was viewed with disbelief by the Bolivian population, who received the news of the Viloco tragedy through the media. It was also cautiously embraced by left-wing organizations such as the Bolivian Workers' Center (COB).

=== Ovando-Torres nationalism ===
The Revolutionary Mandate of the Armed Forces, the ideological basis of the new government, was presented to the Bolivian nation. The manifesto was written by Juan José Torres and signed by officers Rogelio Miranda, David Lafuente Soto and Admiral Alberto Albarracín. It was a "nationalist and revolutionary" program, which meant the resumption of ideals of the Bolivian National Revolution and the reflection of the influence of the Peruanismo of Juan Velasco Alvarado. This document spoke of a transformation of Bolivia's economic, political and sociocultural structures. The document also explains the construction of an independent foreign policy and a campaign to eradicate the guerrilla threat.

The Armed Forces under the direction of Commander Torres drafted a Revolutionary Mandate of the Armed Forces No. 2, requesting the government to nationalize Gulf Oil. On October 17, President Ovando by Supreme Decree 08956 issued the revocation of all concessions of the Gulf Oil Company, active in Bolivia since 1956. The control of the nationalized company was transferred to YPFB. The nationalization of Gulf was planned by the minister of mines and oil Marcelo Quiroga Santa Cruz and supported by the commander Juan José Torres, who sent troops to occupy the facilities. This event was designated by the Ovando regime as “Day of National Dignity”.

== Consequences ==
The 1967 Constitution was suspended after the September 26 coup - only being restored with the takeover of David Padilla's transitional government in 1978. During the first months of the Ovando regime, three mysterious murders occurred in Bolivia. The first of these occurred in November 1969, against the pro-Barrientos peasant leader Jorge Soliz Román, an opponent of Ovando. The other two took place between February and March 1970, against journalist Jaime Otero Calderón and couple Alfredo and Martha Alexander.

Despite popular measures such as the nationalization of Gulf, the Ovando government failed to consolidate political support from both the left and the right. This would lead to a polarized environment in the Armed Forces, ending with the deposition of Ovando during a military coup crisis in October 1970. General Juan José Torres, a former collaborator of Ovando, emerges as the new President of Bolivia - with his government continuing Ovando's nationalist and reformist policies.

== Bibliography ==
- James Dunkerley, Rebelión en las venas, la lucha politica en Bolivia 1952-1982, La Paz, Biblioteca del Bicentenario de Bolivia, Plural Editores, 2016.
- Adys Cupull et Froilán González, La CIA contra el Che, Bolivie, Editora Política, 1993 (ISBN 978-9-590-10093-2)
