= Shimose =

Shimose may refer to:

- 11492 Shimose (1988 VR3), a main-belt asteroid
- Shimose powder or shimosite, a type of explosive shell filling, and a form of picric acid
- Pedro Shimose A Japanese-Bolivian poet and author.
