= National Culture Award (Bolivia) =

National award

- Native name: Premio Nacional de Cultura
- Country: Bolivia
- First award: 1969
- Website: http://www.minculturas.gob.bo

The National Culture Award (Premio Nacional de Cultura) is the Bolivian government's highest honor for arts, literature, and science.

== History ==
The award was established in 1969 to recognize artistic, literary, and scientific achievements in Bolivia. The prize consists of a solid gold medal, a diploma of honor, and a monetary sum that is determined at the time of the announcement.

== Winners ==
- 1969: Armando Alba Zambrana, historian
- 1973: Porfirio Díaz Machicao, historian, writer, and journalist
- 1975: Adolfo Costa du Rels, historian and writer
- 1976: Guillermo Francovich, journalist and playwright
- 1977: Carlos Ponce Sanginés, archaeologist and researcher; and Marina Núñez del Prado, sculptor
- 1988: Gunnar Mendoza, historian and archivist
- 1989: Alberto Crespo Rodas, historian; and Julia Elena Fortún, anthropologist
- 1990: Pedro Susz Kohl, film critic and researcher
- 1991: Mariano Baptista Gumucio, journalist and writer
- 1992: Mario Estensoro Vásquez, musician and teacher
- 1993: Joaquín Gantier, historian
- 1994: Plácido Molina Barbery, writer and historian; and Franklin Anaya Arze, musician
- 1995: Jorge Sanjinés, filmmaker; José de Mesa, historian; and Teresa Gisbert, art historian
- 1996: Wilson Mendieta Pacheco, historian; Pedro Rivero Mercado, writer and journalist; and Enrique Kempff Mercado, writer
- 1997: Ricardo Pérez Alcalá, visual artist
- 1998: Alberto Villalpando
- 1999: Pedro Shimose, poet and journalist
- 2000: Roberto Querejazu Calvo, historian and writer
- 2001: Jorge Ruiz Calvimonte, filmmaker
- 2002: Rubén Carrasco de la Vega, essayist and writer
- 2003: Jorge Siles Salinas, writer and historian; and Nilo Soruco, singer-songwriter
- 2004: Gil Imaná, visual artist; Inés Córdova, visual artist; and Ramiro Condarco Morales, historian and sociologist
- 2005: Juan Carlos Calderón Romero, architect; and Julio de la Vega, writer
- 2006: Alfredo La Placa, visual artist
- 2008: Néstor Taboada Terán, writer
- 2009: Tonchy Antezana, filmmaker
- 2010: (not given)
- 2011: (not given)
- 2012: Celestino Campos Iglesias, musician and composer
- 2013: Luis Rico, singer-songwriter
- 2014: Gonzalo Lema, writer
- 2016: Matilde Casazola, poet and composer
- 2017: Silvia Peñaloza, visual artist
- 2018: Ernesto Cavour, musician
- 2019: Jorge Mansilla Torres, poet and journalist
- 2025: Eusebio Choque, visual artist; and Alfredo Coca, musician
