= Biblioteca de la Presidencia de Colombia =

Colombian literary and historical book series

Biblioteca de la Presidencia de Colombia (Library of the Presidency of Colombia) is a state-sponsored literary and historical Colombian book series published in the mid-1950s.

== History ==
It was published between 1954 and 1958, that is, during the presidency of Gustavo Rojas Pinilla. Issued in Bogotá, the series comprises key works of Colombian literature and historiography, including classics such as those by José Manuel Restrepo (1781–1863). The series comprises fifty titles.

The volumes were published by the Empresa Nacional de Publicaciones de Colombia, under the management of Jorge Luis Arango. The published literary works are of special interest for the literature and history of that country, "some of them unpublished for centuries; some printed, but today very rare and difficult to obtain”.

The Autobiografia (Autobiography) of the acclaimed Colombian politician, historian and investigator José Manuel Restrepo f.e. gives information on Colombian military and political history. The five volumes Historia documentada de la iglesia en Urabá y el Darién; desde el descubrimiento hasta nuestros días (Documented history of the Church in Urabá and Darién; from the Discovery to the present day) of Father Severino de Santa Teresa f.e. contain the history from the Discovery up to 1810, and the period of Independent Spanish America (1810–1956). An other volumes ist the famous Recopilación historial — Historia de Santa Marta y Nuevo Reino de Granada (Historical Compilation — History of Santa Marta and the New Kingdom of Granada) by Frey Pedro de Aguado, originally published in 1568.

== Overview (in selection) ==
- 1-4 Diario político y militar: memorias sobre los sucesos importantes de la época para servir a la historia de la Revolución de Colombia y de la Nueva Granada, desde 1819 para adelante. José Manuel Restrepo. 1954
- 21 Antología del pensamiento filosófico en Colombia, 1647 a 1761, Juan D. García Bacca. 1955
- 23 Historia de las misiones de los Llanos de Casanare y los ríos Orinoco y Meta. Juan Rivero. 1956
- 26 Teatro del desengaño, Juan de Ribero (S. J.), prólogo de Mario Germán Romero. 1956
- 28-29 Maravillas de la naturaleza. 2 vols. Juan de Santa Gertrudis. 1956
- 30 Autobiografia. José Manuel Restrepo. 1957 (Autobiografia: apuntamientos sobre la emigración de 1816 e índices del "Diario político")
- 39-43 Historia documentada de la iglesia en Urabá y el Darién. Father Severino de Santa Teresa. 1956–1957
- 44 Fundación del Monasterio de la Enseñanza: Epigramas y otras obras inéditas o importantes. Manuel del Socorro Rodríguez. 1957 (about this Benedictine nuns’ monastery, dedicated to the education of girls, located in Bogotá and founded in the year 1783)
- 46 Estudios grammaticales. Marco Fidel Suárez. Una advertencia y noticia bibliográfica por D. Miguel Antonio Caro. 1957

(unsorted)

- Memoria sobre la vida del general Simón Bolívar, Tomás C. de Mosquera
- Elegías de varones ilustres de Indias, Juan de Castellanos
- Peregrinación de Alpha, Manuel Ancízar
- Estudios arqueológicos y etnográficos, Carlos Cuervo Márquez
- Recopilación historial, fray Pedro de Aguado, segunda edición (1956–1957), 4 volúmenes, con introducción, notas y comentarios de Juan Friede; obra publicada originalmente en 1906
- Historia de la provincia del Nuevo Reino y Quito de la Compañía de Jesús, Pedro de Mercado. 1957, 4 vols.
- Colombia, Eliseo Reclus, traducción de F. J. Vergara y Velasco. 1958
- Una excursión al territorio de San Martín, Emiliano Restrepo Echavarría, 1957
- Historia de la Literatura en Nueva Granada. Desde la Conquista hasta la Independencia (1583–1820), José María Vergara y Vergara, segunda edición, 1958, 3 vols.
- De Instauranda aethiopum salute. Alonso de Sandoval. El mundo de la esclavitud negra in América, préf. Ángel Valtierra, 1956

== See also ==
- Sepan cuantos (Mexico)
- Biblioteca Ayacucho (Venezuela)
- Colección de libros y documentos referentes a la historia del Perú (Peru)
- Colección de historiadores de Chile y documentos relativos a la historia nacional (Chile)
- Biblioteca del Bicentenario de Bolivia (Bolivia)
