= Teoponte Guerrilla =

1970 armed conflict in Bolivia

- Part of the Cold War
Date	July 19, 1970 – November 1, 1970
Location	Bolivia
Result	Bolivian government victory

Belligerents
ELN (Teoponte)	Bolivia

Commanders and leaders
Osvaldo Peredo; Elmo Catalán	Alfredo Ovando Candía (Until October 6); Juan José Torres (From October 6)

Casualties and losses
67; Osvaldo Peredo exiled	unknown

The Teoponte Guerrilla was an armed conflict that occurred in 1970. After the failure of Che Guevara's guerrilla, radical leftists in Bolivia began to organize again to set up guerrilla resistance, but suffered severe persecution that left many incarcerated, dead, or in exile. Despite this, radical university students in Bolivia organized a new insurgency attempt in Teoponte in 1970, trying to overcome mistakes made by Guevara's guerrilla. The participants were mostly Bolivians, but Chileans, Argentines, and Peruvians also partook. The guerrilla, which took form in an expedition into the lowlands starting from the Altiplano, lasted from July 19 to November 1 and saw most of its inexperienced participants die by attacks from the military or from disease. When Salvador Allende assumed office in Chile on November 4, his very first decree was to give asylum to the survivors.

== History and activities ==
The ELN continued its work after the deaths of its two principal leaders, this time under the military command of Osvaldo "Chato" Peredo. Under his leadership, a group of about ten members of the Executive Committee of the Bolivian University Confederation (CUB), along with a handful of Bolivian, Chilean, and Peruvian combatants, launched the second insurrectionist offensive in five years.
