= Rogelio Miranda =

Bolivian general and diplomat (born 1922)

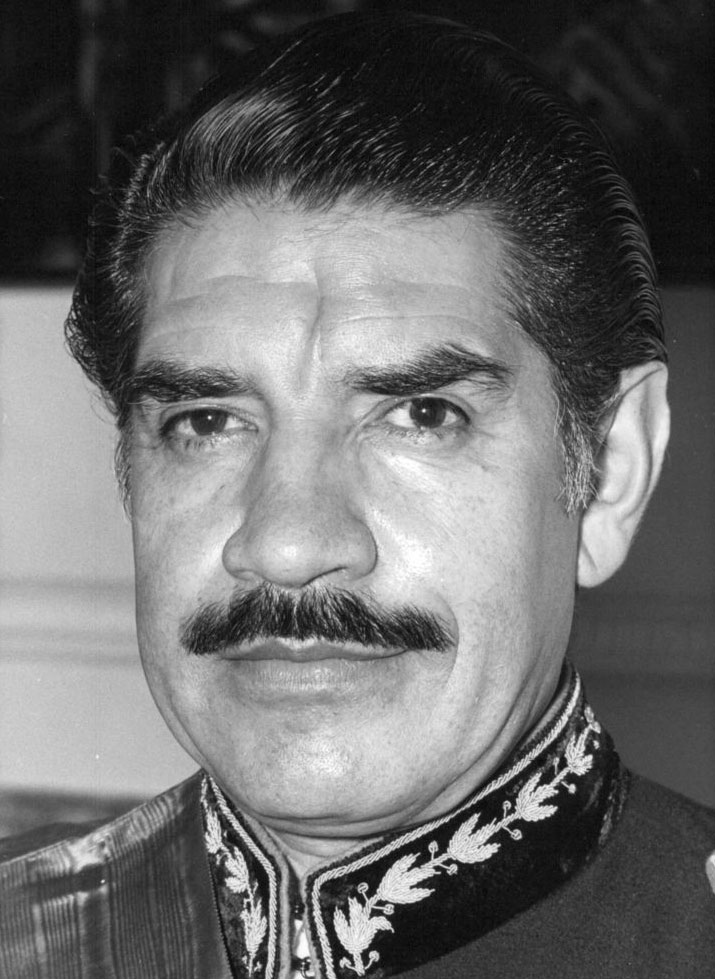
- General Miranda in 1974.

President of Bolivia
- In office 6 October 1970 – 6 October 1970
- Preceded by: Alfredo Ovando Candía
- Succeeded by: Junta of Commanders of the Armed Forces 1970 (Bolivia)

Personal details
- Born: Rogelio Miranda Baldivia; 15 October 1922 La Paz, Bolivia
- Spouse: Gladys Adet Zamora
- Children: 2

Military service
- Allegiance: Bolivia
- Branch/service: Bolivian Army
- Years of service: 1938–1970
- Rank: General

Rogelio Miranda Baldivia (born 15 October 1922) was a Bolivian general. He was also Bolivian Ambassador to the United Kingdom (1974–1978).

== Life and career ==
Rogelio Miranda Baldivia was born in La Paz on 15 October 1922. Belonging to a middle class and religious family, Miranda studied at the Catholic school "La Salle". He began his military career in 1938, entering the Army Military College. Also did military studies in the United States (Fort Worth). He married Gladys Adet Zamora, with whom he had two daughters.

He was minister of agriculture during the government of René Barrientos. In 1970, was appointed army commander by Alfredo Ovando to replace Juan José Torres. General Miranda has been described as a far-right conservative. In October 1970, Miranda led a military coup against president Ovando, subsequently declaring himself as president over the junta that he was planning on installing. However, the revolt not long after by the troops under General Torres led to a merging of the two groups and the instatement of Torres as president instead.

With Torres' victory, Miranda took refuge in the Argentine embassy and went into exile in Buenos Aires with his wife and daughters.

In August 1971, General Torres was overthrown by Hugo Banzer. General Banzer would reintegrate military personnel like the exiled Miranda into his government. During the Banzer regime, Rogelio Miranda served for four years as Bolivian ambassador to the United Kingdom from 1974 to 1978.

== Bibliography ==
- DE TORRES A BANZER, DIEZ MESES DE EMERGENCIA EN BOLIVIA; Lozada Gallardo; Jorge; Ediciones Periferia, Buenos Aires, 1973
- REBELIÓN EN LAS VENAS, LA LUCHA POLITICA EN BOLIVIA 1952-1982; Dunkerley, James; Biblioteca del Bicentenario de Bolivia, Plural Editores, La Paz, 2016
