= Inés Córdova =

- Born: Inés Córdova Suárez; 1927; Potosí, Bolivia
- Died: 19 May 2010 (aged 82); La Paz, Bolivia
- Education: Hernando Siles National Academy of Fine Arts
- Occupations: Painter, potter
- Spouse: Gil Imaná
- Awards: National Culture Award (2004)

Inés Córdova Suárez (1927 – 19 May 2010) was a Bolivian artist.

== Biography ==
Inés Córdova studied at the Hernando Siles National Academy of Fine Arts in the Sopocachi neighborhood of La Paz, as well as the Universidad del Trabajo del Uruguay in Montevideo and the Conservatorio Massana in Barcelona. In the 1960s she developed new collage techniques incorporating textiles and metal.

The artist Gil Imaná confirmed the death of Córdova, who had been his wife for 46 years, on 19 May 2010 in La Paz.

The country loses an artist; I lose my partner.

— Gil Imaná

In April 2017, Imaná donated all of his artistic patrimony to the Cultural Foundation of the Central Bank of Bolivia (Fundación Cultural Banco Central de Bolivia; FCBCB). This included a property in Sopocachi (on Aspiazu and 20 de Octubre Streets) and several collections comprising approximately 6,000 pieces. One half corresponds to work in ceramics, sculpture, and painting by Córdova and by Imaná himself. The other belongs to collections of contemporary painting by Bolivian and Latin American artists, colonial objects, ceramics, and pre-Hispanic Andean weavings.

== Murals ==
- 1965, Mural in ceramic, Engineering Faculty of UMSA (together with Gil Imaná)
- 1981, Tránsito en el tiempo, Mutual "La Primera"
- 1985, Telúrica americana, panel mural enriched with textiles at OAS headquarters in Washington, D.C.

== Awards and distinctions ==
- 1973, Second Prize in painting from Salón Murillo with the work Rojo sol altiplano, La Paz
- 2004, "Obra de vida" Award from Salón Murillo, La Paz
- 2004, National Culture Award, La Paz
