= Alberto Villalpando =

Bolivian composer (born 1940)

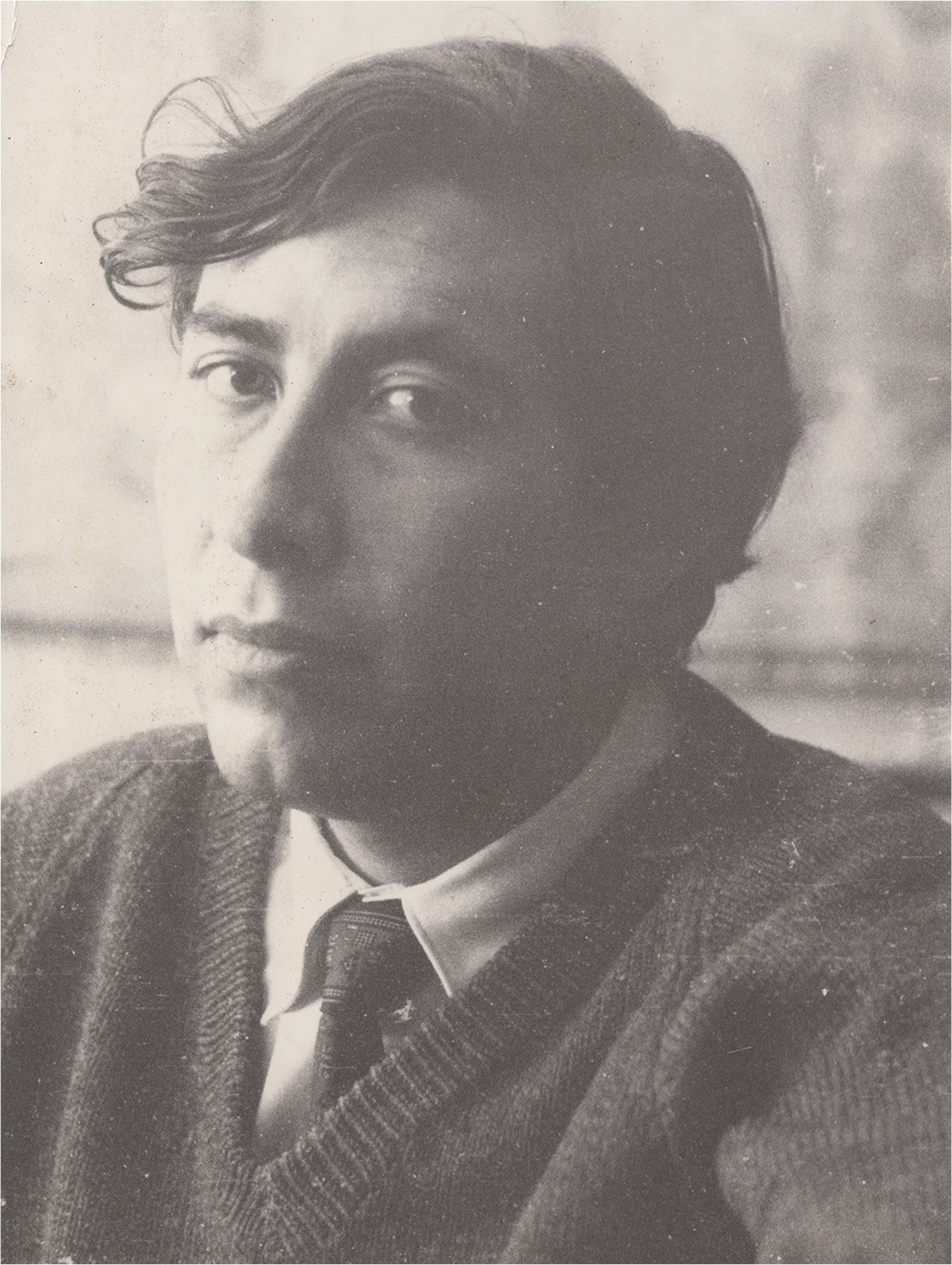
- Born: Antonio Alberto Villalpando; 21 November 1940 (age 85); La Paz, Bolivia
- Occupation: Composer
- Awards: National Culture Award (1998)

Alberto Villalpando (born 21 November 1940) is a Bolivian composer.

== Biography ==
Villalpando was born in La Paz. He began his musical training in Potosí under Santiago Velásquez and Padre José Díaz Gainza. From 1958 he studied at the Conservatory of Buenos Aires with Alberto Ginastera, Pedro Sáenz, Abraham Jurafsky and Roberto García Morillo, and in 1963–1964 at the Latin American Center for Higher Musical Studies (CLAEM) in Buenos Aires with Olivier Messiaen, Riccardo Malipiero, Luigi Dallapiccola, Alberto Ginastera, Bruno Maderna and Aaron Copland. There, in collaboration with Miguel Angel Rondano, he developed a sound installation for an exhibition of the painter Carlos Squirru.

In 1964 he became head of the State Film Institute of Bolivia, and in 1967 was appointed director of the Music Department of the Bolivian Ministry of Culture. In addition, he served as professor of composition and director of the National Conservatory of La Paz and the music seminar of the Universidad Católica Boliviana and was Bolivian cultural attaché to France. In 1998 he received Bolivia's National Culture Award.

In addition to orchestral works such as Phantastischen Liturgie, Strukturen (for piano and orchestra), and Von der Liebe, der Furcht und dem Schweigen (for piano and chamber orchestra), he composed ballet and film music, works for chamber orchestra, and Sonnengesang for soloists, choir and orchestra. While studying electroacoustic music, he benefited from the tape recorder, producing Bolivianos...! in Leo Küpper's recording studio. Later he drew on electroacoustic sound and the technical developments offered by MIDI.

== Works ==
- Five Preludes for solo piano, 1960
- La Muerte for tape, 1964
- Mística No. 3 for two string quartets, horn, flute, double bass and tape, 1970
- Mística No. 4 for string quartet, piano and tape, 1970
- Bolivianos...! for tape, 1973
- Yamar y Armor, ballet music for voice, tape and orchestra, after Blanca Wiethüchter, 1975
- Desde el Jardín de Morador for MIDI, 1990
- Transformaciones del agua y del fuego en las montanas for orchestra 1991
- De los Elementos for MIDI, 1991
- Manchaypuytu, opera, 1995
- Qantatai for choir, narrator and electronic sounds, 1996
- La Lagarta, ballet for narrator and elektroakustische sounds, after Blanca Wiethüchter, 2002
- Piano 3 for piano and two piano synthesizers, 2002
- Mística 10 for viola profonda and piano, 2009
- Los diálogos de Tunupa for viola profonda and string orchestra, 2011
