= Cabinet of Juan José Torres =

General Juan José Torres had taken the Presidency 7 October 1970, and formed his cabinet.

Ministry / Date	09.10.1970	20.10.1970	17.03.1971
Foreign and Religious Affaire	Emilio Molina Pizarro, mil		Huáscar Taborga Torrico, ind
Interior, Migration and Justice	Jorge Gallardo Lozada, MNRI		
National Defense	David La Fuente Soto, mil		Emilio Molina Pizarro, mil
Planning and Co-ordination	Flavio Machicado Saravia, ind	Gustavo Luna Uzquiano, ind	
Finance	Antonio Sánchez de Lozada, ind	Flavio Machicado Saravia, ind	
Education and Culture	vacancy	Huáscar Taborga Torrico, ind	Hugo Poppe Entrambasaguas, MIR
Transport, Communications and Aviation	Jaime Paz Soldán Pol, mil		Jaime Cadima Valdez, mil
Labor and Union Affairs	Abel Ayoroa Argandoña, MNRI		Isaac Sandoval Rodriguez, ind
Industry, Commerce and Tourism	Jesús Vía Solís, mil		Edmundo Roca Vaca Diez, MNR
Mining and Metallurgy	Eduardo Méndez Pereyra, mil		
Energy and Hydrocarbons	Enrique Mariaca Bilbao, ind		
Agriculture and Peasant Affairs	Hugo Céspedes Espinoza, mil		Mario Candia Navarro, mil
Health and Social Security	Guillermo Aponte Burela, FARO		Javier Torres Goitia, MNRI
Housing and Urbanism	Jorge Prudencio Cossío, ind		
Press and Information	Gastón Lupo Gamarra, mil		Ramiro Villarroel Claure, ind
Secretary to the Cabinet	Mario Velarde Dorado, MNRI		
State	José Ortíz Mercado, MNRI		no
