= Marina Núñez del Prado =

Bolivian sculptor

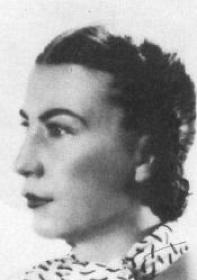
- Born: 17 October 1910; La Paz, Bolivia
- Died: 9 September 1995 (aged 84); Lima, Peru
- Occupation: Sculptor

Marina Núñez del Prado (17 October 1910 – 9 September 1995) was a celebrated Bolivian sculptor.

One of the most respected sculptors from Latin America, she based many of her sculptures off of the female form as well as taking inspiration from animals and landscapes native to Bolivia. Her work is highly sensuous, with rolling curves. She carved from native Bolivian woods, as well as black granite, alabaster, basalt and white onyx. Perhaps one of her most famous works is White Venus (1960), a stylized female body in white onyx. Another celebrated work is Mother and Child, sculpted in white onyx. Indigenous Bolivian cultures inspired much of her work.

== Bolivia and La Paz ==
Bolivia is known for its architecture, people, its oil industry, and its art. Its art is very distinct yet it was also influenced by a handful of western artistic movements that were being introduced. While these movements like Neo-classicism had a negative effect on sculpture, Bolivia still managed to have three stylistic periods known as Mannerism, Realism, and Hyperrealism. Each period had a handful of artists produce many unique works. For example in the Hyperrealist period, there were artists who made sculptures with real props attached to them, such as wigs or glasses. There was also a slight focus on religion with pieces like Christ of La Recoleta and Virgin of Copacabana.

La Paz, founded by Alonzo Mendoza in 1548, is the birthplace of Marina Núñez Del Prado. Due to art being imported from Spain, stylistic movements, such as Baroque, found their way into La Paz and were taught in Lake Titicaca School. Later, Mestizo Baroque, Neo-classicism and eventually Rococo began influencing the art and architecture of La Paz. One example of this is the Universidad Mayor de San Andrés, which used a combination of Baroque and Neo-classicism. While there was a lot of influence from newer movements like abstraction, around 1956, there was also a growing interest in making folk art and other traditional styles of art.

== Early life and education ==
Marina Núñez Del Prado was born in La Paz, Bolivia on 17 October 1910. Del Prado first discovered her love of art in her youth while studying sculptural modeling techniques in La Paz. Her passion for sculpture was inspired by the work of Michelangelo as well as Miguel Ángel. She later went on to study fine art at the Academy of Fine Arts in La Paz, graduating in 1930. Shortly after her graduation, had her first of several exhibitions in La Paz. She continued on at her alma mater as an instructor of artistic anatomy and sculpture. She became the first woman to achieve a position as the chair of the Academy.

While she was working at the Academy of Fine Arts, La Paz, Del Prado began exhibiting locally. She was very artistically active, and collaborated with various artists, such as Cecilio Guzmán de Rojas, a Bolivian painter who led the Indigenous art movement at that time. Similarly Del Prado primarily focused her work on the rights of Indigenous peoples and Indigenismo, a political ideology centered on the relationship of the Indigenous population with the government.

Del Prado left her job at the university and her home city of La Paz to travel in 1938. Some research states that for the next eight years after her graduation, she specialized in artistic anatomy and won a gold medal from Argentina in 1936 and Berlin in 1938. She spent the next several years traveling through Peru, Uruguay, and Argentina. She then traveled to other countries outside of South America, including Egypt, parts of Europe, and the United States, where she studied for 8 years in New York on a fellowship awarded by the America Association of University Women.

While in New York, Del Prado won a Gold Medal for her exhibition Miners in Rebellion. This work was centered on the workers of the Bolivian region of Potosi. Shortly after this, in 1948, Del Prado moved back to La Paz, where she continued to make works inspired by the Indigenous peoples of South America, as well as the landscape and culture of her homeland. She later moved to Peru in 1972, where she lived with her husband, Jorge Falcón, a writer native to Peru. With her four siblings, Del Prado donated the Casa Museo Marina Nuñez del Prado to the people of Bolivia in memory of her parents. The museum houses over a thousand works of art, mostly done by Del Prado and some by her sister, Nilda. Del Prado died in Lima, Peru in 1995.

== Art career ==
In 1938 she left her post and traveled through Bolivia, Peru, Argentina, Uruguay, the United States, Europe, and Egypt. From 1940 to 1948, she worked and organized exhibitions of her work in the United States while on a scholarship. In 1946 Miners in Revolt, inspired by the miners in Bolivia's Potosí Department, won a gold medal in a New York exhibition. In 1948 she returned to Bolivia, finally settling down in La Paz in 1958. By 1972 she moved to Peru where she lived with her husband, a Peruvian writer.

While in New York, she made nude sculptures that were sixty inches tall and went to the Ettl Studios to learn how to cast. She then tried to apply to the American Association of University Women, or AAUW, but was rejected on her first attempt. Her second letter managed to convince Mary H. Smith as it showed her enthusiasm for art and education. Later, she found herself wanting to use her art to bring the world together by spreading information about her heritage as well as bring back what she learned to Bolivia. She had accomplished and learned a lot in New York like her style becoming more modern, for example. She then returned the favor by giving her piece, Mother and Child, to the AAUW.

She received Bolivia's National Culture Award in 1977.

Along her successful career she met outstanding artists such as Pablo Picasso, Constantin Brâncuși, poets Gabriela Mistral, Alfonsina Storni and Juana de Ibarbourou. She was also a friend of the Bolivian writer Franz Tamayo. Her work has been the subject of international and national critique. Botelho Gozalvez argues that her work is marked by two main characteristics: grace and strength. The strength is seen through her Andean landscapes and her grace is recognizable in the harmonious geometry of her works. Botelho claims that Nunez del Prado has a "genius loci" and distinguishes four periods in her work. The first period is characterized by the musical thematic of her work. The second period is characterized by the use of bidimensional sculpture and a social thematic. The third period is characterized by the tridimensional stone sculpture. It is also known as the "maternal" period because of her aymara Madonnas and other depictions of Indigenous women. Finally, the fourth period is the neo-abstract, which has been influenced by Picasso, Archipenko and Milles. In similar fashion Hector Herazo Rojas argues that her works is characterized by strength, grace and monumentality He also points out that her works revolve around the thematic of race, myth and tradition. Her sculptures of Indigenous motherly figures and mythic animals can attest to this. Pedro Querejazu coincides with Herazo Rojas on her race thematic and suggest that her sculptures originated within the movement of "native" realism. According to him, her later her work adopted a modern and international expression which achieved a final stage immersed in the abstractism. This later work focused on the female figure and creatures of the Andes. On this later stage she worked with Amazonian tropical woods, bronze, and stones such as granite, andesite, basalt, onyx and marble. Other critics like Eduardo Mendoza Varela, who reviewed her sculptures exhibition shown in the Luis Angel Arango library at the bank of the Republic of Colombia in Bogota Colombia, argues that her work is 'miraculous' and 'mysterious'. His critique employs poetic metaphors to emphasize her skills and mastery of the materials in her sculptures. He considers the abstracted and reduced forms as possessing the ability to go beyond just physical representation but capture the spirit of the artist herself. The critic Guillermo Nino de Guzman also refers to her work as "genius" and a constant force of creative energy in regards to her series "Mujeres al Viento". Finally, her work has inspired poetry verses. The Spanish poet Rafael Alberti has dedicated an homage to her work.

== Núñez Del Prado Museum ==
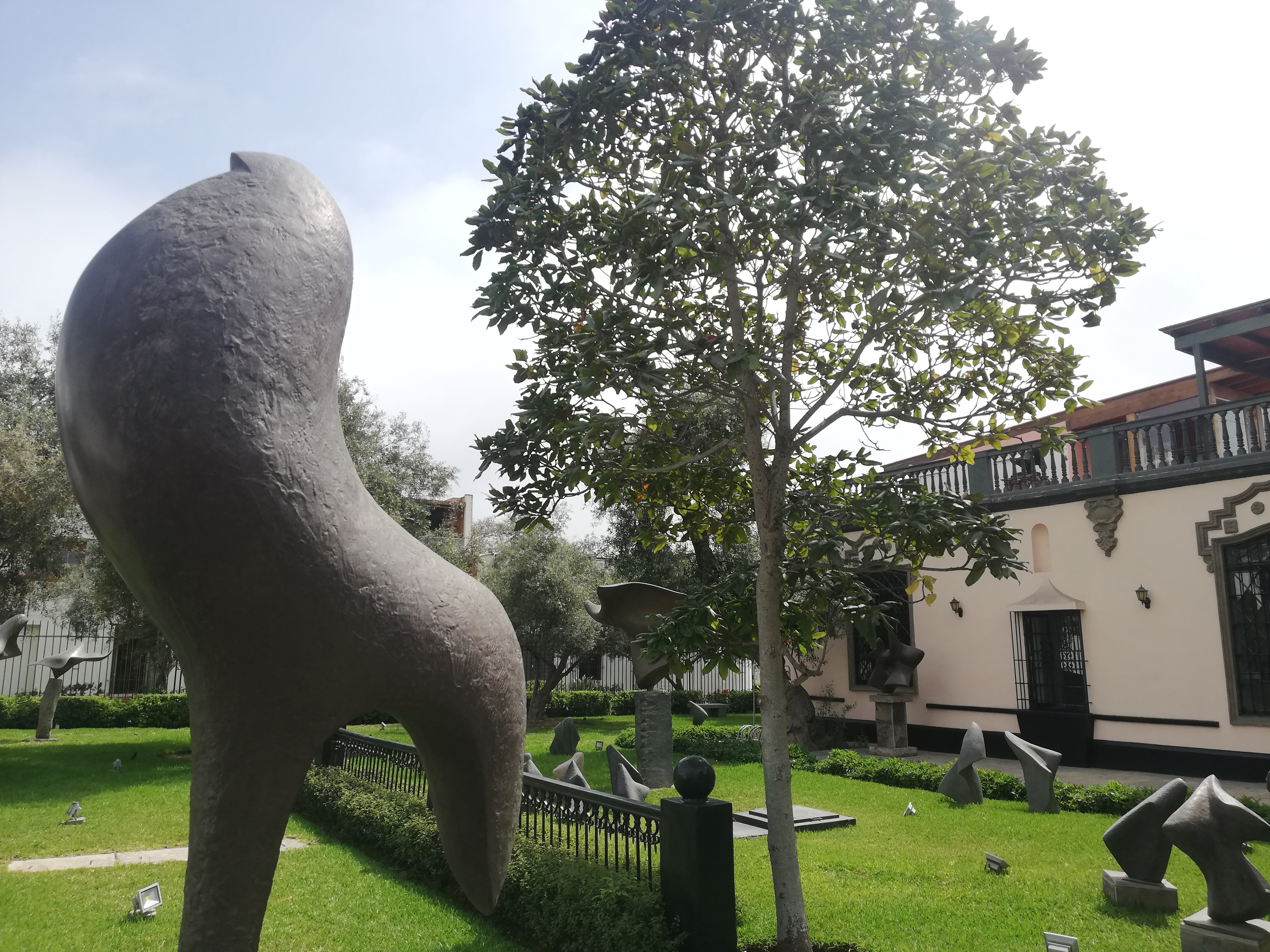
Sculptures outside the House Museum

In the 1970s Marina Núñez del Prado established her residence and art studio in what would become the house museum, located in 300 Ántero Aspillaga Street, right at the center of the El Olivar Forest. This neocolonial style building was conceived in 1926 by the engineer Luis Alayza and Paz Soldán and raised by the master builder Enrique Rodrigo, being one of the first buildings in the area. It became the first house in the whole of El Olivar to be declared National Cultural Heritage and in 1984 the house-museum of the Núñez del Prado Foundation was officially inaugurated in La Paz in honor of Marina Núñez del Prado's parents.

The House Museum, governed by the Núñez del Prado Foundation, is a private museum that enriches the Bolivian heritage. For decades it was a home and studio to Marina Nunez del Prado, and now it has become the Casa Museo and a treasured place of history and talent to those of Bolivia. The museum contains 1,014 works by del Prado, which constitute the greater repository of her work including sculptures, drawings and sketches by Marina, thus making it the largest existing collection of her works. But within the museum you will not only find the work of Marina, but also that of her sister Nilda, who was a great goldsmith and painter. The museum is filled with their family environment, works of her father, and the collections of Bolivian Silver, Colonial Art, Contemporary Painting, and Handicrafts.

The house is surrounded by a garden of sculptures that had changing results affected by the urban modifications of its surroundings. It is composed of two levels being the first one of adobe and the second one of quincha brava. On the first floor there is a small central courtyard with a fused iron fountain. Its façade is colorful and on the right hand side, it reproduces, on a smaller scale, the front of the famous Palace of the Admiral of the city of Cusco. The workshop of the sculptor Marina Núñez, located on the second level, has been considered as the heart of the house and the intervention revolves around it.

For a large period of time the situation of the home museum of Marina Nunez del Prado was one of complication. At the time the museum had been closed and forgotten for almost 10 years due to lack of management and support. The closing was due to a break in its infrastructure during the initial construction of the American Tunnel and had remained closed to the public while many people claim the national or municipal government never took care of the situation. There exist many personal accounts of neighbors who had watched the museum remain neglected for years and described its importance to their community and art history. They speak highly of the museum and the works included as well as speak fondly of del Prado as an artist. In 2012 they published a note that restoration of the house would begin and that work was being done to solve the many architectural issues. It was reopened in April 2015 by the San Isidro District Council and the curatorial work made for the selection of the pieces being shown was made by Gustavo Buntinx.

== Legacy and death ==
Marina Nunez del Prado died in Lima, Peru on 9 September 1995, where she had spent the last twenty-five years of her life working. She left behind a legacy that significantly enriched Bolivian art and culture but was also a significant contribution to the practice of sculpture and Latin-American art. In her lifetime, she had traveled and accomplished so much and became as well known as the artist she was inspired by like Picasso or Gabriel Mistral.

Her physical legacy is the Museo de Nunez del Prado which was her family home. It now houses over 1000 of her works including drawings and sketches. The museum preserves the work of Nunez del Prado as well as contributions made by her sister who was a gifted goldsmith and painter and her father. Located in the center of the El Olivar Forest, the museum is a National Cultural Heritage site. Admission to the museum is free, but international visitors require personal identification such as a passport. Visits are guided by the curator.

Nunez del Prado's non-physical legacy far extends beyond the borders of Peru. Her work has significantly impacted the field of sculpture both in Latin America and internationally. Her work has been a great influence in the collective identity of South American art. She has also been a subject in literature like work by the Argentine poet Alfonsina Storni, Uruguayan narrator Juana de Ibarbourou and Spanish poet Raphael Alberti. Since 1930 her work has impacted and been the source of admiration in countries such as Peru, Argentina, Uruguay, Germany, USA, Brazil, Spain, Italy, France, Cuba and Mexico.
