= Alfredo Ovando =

President of Bolivia (1965–1966, 1969–1970)

General Alfredo Ovando
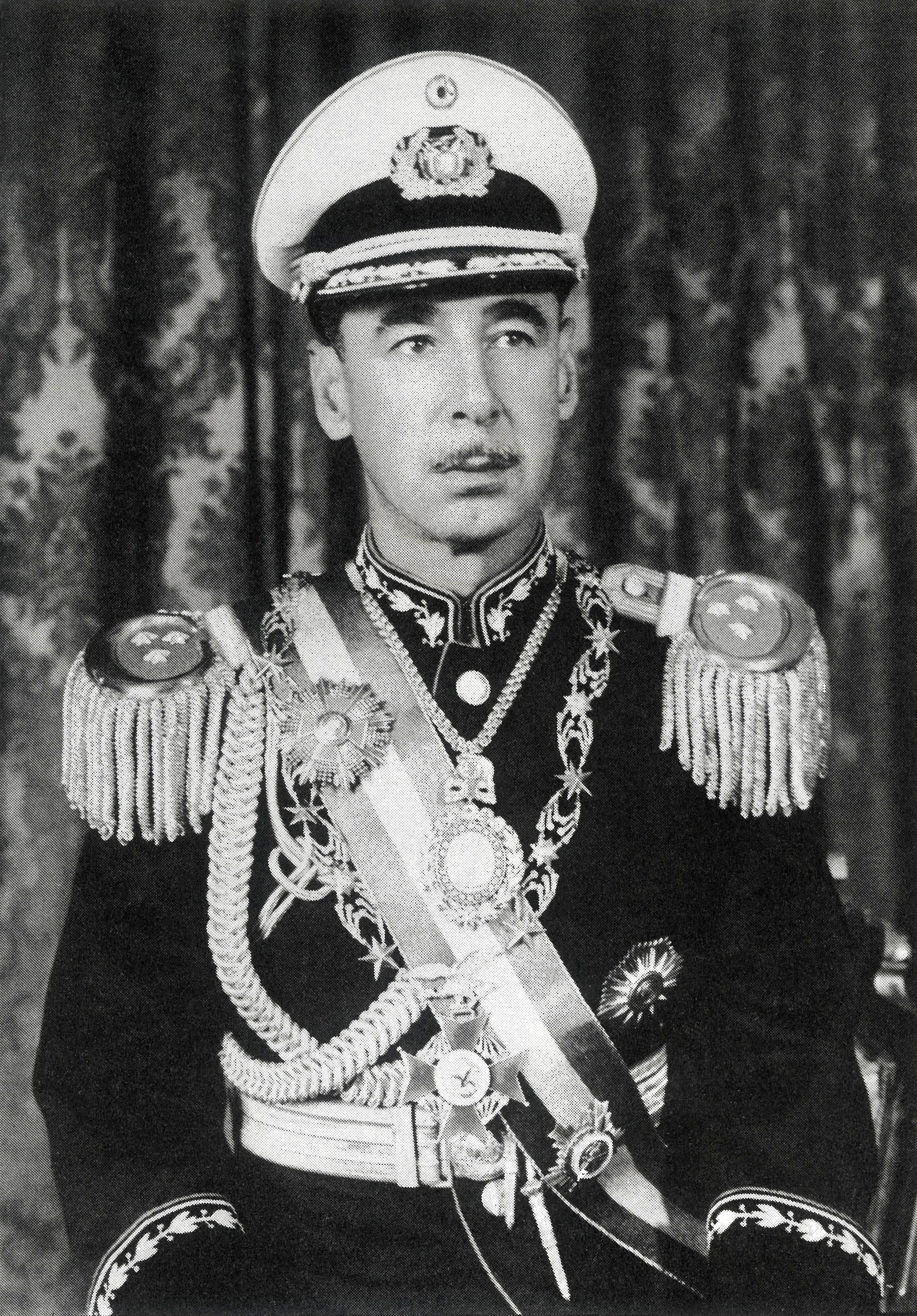
- Official portrait, c. 1969–1970

48th President of Bolivia
- In office 26 September 1969 – 6 October 1970
- Vice President: Vacant
- Preceded by: Luis Adolfo Siles
- Succeeded by: Juan José Torres
- In office 26 May 1965 – 6 August 1966 (Note: Co-president: 26 May 1965 – 2 January 1966.)
- Vice President: Vacant
- Preceded by: René Barrientos
- Succeeded by: René Barrientos

Personal details
- Born: Alfredo Ovando Candia; 6 April 1918 Cobija, National Territory of Colonies, Bolivia
- Died: 24 January 1982 (aged 63) La Paz, Bolivia
- Spouse: Elsa Omiste
- Parents: Alejandro Ovando; Mercedes Candia
- Education: Military College of the Army

Military service
- Allegiance: Bolivia
- Branch/service: Bolivian Army
- Years of service: 1933–1969
- Rank: General
- Battles/wars: Chaco War

Alfredo Ovando Candia (6 April 1918 – 24 January 1982) was a Bolivian military officer and political leader who served as the 48th president of Bolivia from 1965 to 1966 and 1969 to 1970. During his first term, he shared power with René Barrientos as co-president of a military junta.

== Early years ==
Ovando was born in Cobija from an upper-middle-class family of immigrant parents from Extremadura, Spain and Piedmont, Italy. He started his long military career in the early 1930s, when he served in the Chaco War against Paraguay. Originally rather apolitical, he was chosen (among others) to lead the reconstituted Armed Forces of Bolivia in the aftermath of the 1952 Revolution that installed in power the reformist Revolutionary Nationalist Movement party, better known as the MNR. Ovando lived through the relative deprivation, reduced budgets, and loss of prestige of the defeated Bolivian army during the early years of MNR rule. By the early 1960s, President Víctor Paz Estenssoro came to rely more heavily on the military in the face of growing political divisions among the governing elites. Equally as important in this rebirth was the considerable pressure exerted by the United States to modernize and equip the troops for a decidedly more political role: that of fighting possible Cuba-styled Communist insurgencies.

== The 1964 coup d'état and the co-presidency ==
When Paz Estenssoro amended the Constitution in 1964 in order to allow himself to run for re-election (a largely frowned-upon move in the largely personalistic world of Bolivian politics), General Ovando, along with the vice-president and former head of the Air Force René Barrientos, toppled Paz from power. They ruled together in a Junta (sometimes called "The Co-Presidency) until January 1966, when Barrientos resigned in order to register himself as a candidate. At that point Ovando became sole President, leading the country to the elections from which the popular Barrientos emerged victorious. With the new president having taken the oath of office in August 1966, Ovando returned to his post as Commander of the Bolivian Air Forces.

== Armed forces commander and president-in-waiting, 1966-69 ==
Uncharismatic but tenacious, Ovando was biding his time, counting on the fact that he would be the logical choice to run for elections once Barrientos' term ended in 1970, perhaps with some electoral "help" from the outgoing administration. Soon, major differences emerged between Ovando and the president, however, especially in regard to the massacre of miners at Siglo XX in June 1967, and the so-called Arguedas Affair of 1968. In early 1967, a guerrilla force had been discovered to be operating in the rural Bolivian southwest under the leadership of the Argentine-Cuban revolutionary Ernesto "Che" Guevara. While the popular insurgency was eventually crushed by the US-trained Bolivian military troops under American CIA command, Guevara was captured and executed in October 1967. This event fostered a major spin-off scandal that surfaced in 1968. That year, Barrientos' trusted friend and Minister of Interior, Antonio Arguedas, disappeared with the captured diary of Che Guevara, which soon surfaced in Havana. From abroad, Arguedas confessed himself to have been all along a clandestine Marxist supporter, and denounced Barrientos and many of his aides as being on the CIA's payroll. This event embarrassed US military School of the Americas (SOA) graduate Barrientos as a US-controlled puppet, and prompted Ovando to distance himself from the president with an eye to the projected 1970 elections. (The US SOA notoriously trained many Latin American dictators and death squads in counterinsurgency tactics and torture and disappearance techniques).

The worries proved unnecessary, for Barrientos died in a helicopter crash on 27 April 1969. His vice-president, a little-known Christian-Democrat politician named Luis Adolfo Siles, was sworn as president soon thereafter, in accordance to the Constitution. Siles' poor relations with Ovando led Siles to support the candidacy of the popular Mayor of La Paz, Armando Escobar, as the true successor of the now-constantly eulogized Barrientos, threatening to spoil the carefully laid plans of Ovando. Furthermore, Ovando had been undergoing a political metamorphosis, and had come to conclude that he had to move to the Left in order to be acceptable as president in the ideologically super-charged atmosphere of the late 1960s. The changes he planned to institute could be difficult to enact in the presence of a potentially hostile Congress. For these reasons, Ovando decided not to wait for the elections (which no one could guarantee he could win, with the popular Escobar as candidate) and on 26 September 1969, he executed a coup d'état that overthrew Siles.

== The 1969-70 Ovando dictatorship ==
Ovando's short (13 month) dictatorship was difficult and marked by political violence. Upon taking office, he declared himself in favor of fundamental changes aimed at enhancing the deplorable living conditions of the vast majority of Bolivians. To this end, he nationalized the Bolivian operations of the U.S.-based Gulf Oil Corporation and called on known leftist intellectuals to become part of his cabinet. Ovando also announced his political adherence to the principles espoused by other so-called "leftist military" regimes then in vogue in Latin America, foremost of which were the regimes of Peru's Juan Velasco and Panama's Omar Torrijos.

Ovando's populist stance surprised many conservative members of the Bolivian military and failed to fully satisfy the increasingly more belligerent forces of the Left, especially the workers and students. Worse, the military (in whose name he served) had become polarized, with some sectors supporting the President and even calling for a further leftward turn (General Juan José Torres) and others criticizing Ovando and urging a more conservative, anti-Communist, and pro U.S. stance (General Rogelio Miranda). In June 1970, a new Marxist guerrilla movement emerged in the lowlands near La Paz, this time constituted mostly by Bolivian university students aligned with the outlawed Ejército de Liberación Nacional (National Liberation Army, or ELN). The new guerrilla outbreak was easily controlled, but Ovando's response had been rather vacillating and timid. He offered a generous safe haven to guerrillas who gave up the fight, for example, in contrast to Barrientos' call for "heads on spikes" in 1967. The forces of the right had had enough.

== The October 1970 coup and retirement ==
On 6 October 1970, an anti-government coup d'état took place via a junta of commanders of the Bolivian Military. However, the polarized forces of the military were evenly split. Much blood was shed on the streets of various major cities, with garrisons fighting each other on behalf of one camp or the other. Eventually, President Ovando sought asylum in a foreign embassy, believing all hope was lost. But the leftist military forces re-asserted themselves under the combative leadership of General Juan José Torres, and eventually triumphed. Embarrassed by his quick abandonment of the fight, and worn out by 13 grueling months in office, Ovando agreed to leave the presidency in the hands of his friend, General Torres. The latter was sworn in and rewarded Ovando with the Bolivian ambassadorship to Spain. Ovando remained in Madrid until 1978, when he returned to Bolivia. In his latter years, he supported the progressive UDP alliance of former President Hernán Siles, but otherwise never participated in active politics again. Ovando died in La Paz on 24 January 1982, at the age of 63. His wife died in 2014.

== Sources ==
- Mesa José de; Gisbert, Teresa; and Carlos D. Mesa, "Historia De Bolivia," 5th edition., pp. 641–655.
- Prado Salmon, Gral. Gary. "Poder y Fuerzas Armadas, 1949-1982."

Political offices
Preceded by René Barrientos	President of Bolivia; 1965–1966	Succeeded by René Barrientos
Preceded by Luis Adolfo Siles	President of Bolivia; 1969–1970	Succeeded by Juan José Torres
