= Jesús Urzagasti =

Bolivian poet and novelist

Jesús Urzagasti (1941–2013) was a Bolivian poet and novelist. His 1969 novel Tirinea is considered by critics to be one of the best Bolivian novels.

== Selected poetry ==
- Cuadernos de Lilino (1972)
- Yerubia (1978)
- The Hill of the Blue Sea (1993)

== Selected prose ==
- Tirinea (1969)
- In the Land of Silence (1987; 2007 Trans. Kay Pritchard)
- From the Window to the Park (1992)
- The Weavers of the Night (1996)
- A Summer with Marina Sangabriel (2001)
- The Tree of the Tribe (2004)
