= Silvia Rivera Cusicanqui =

Bolivian historian

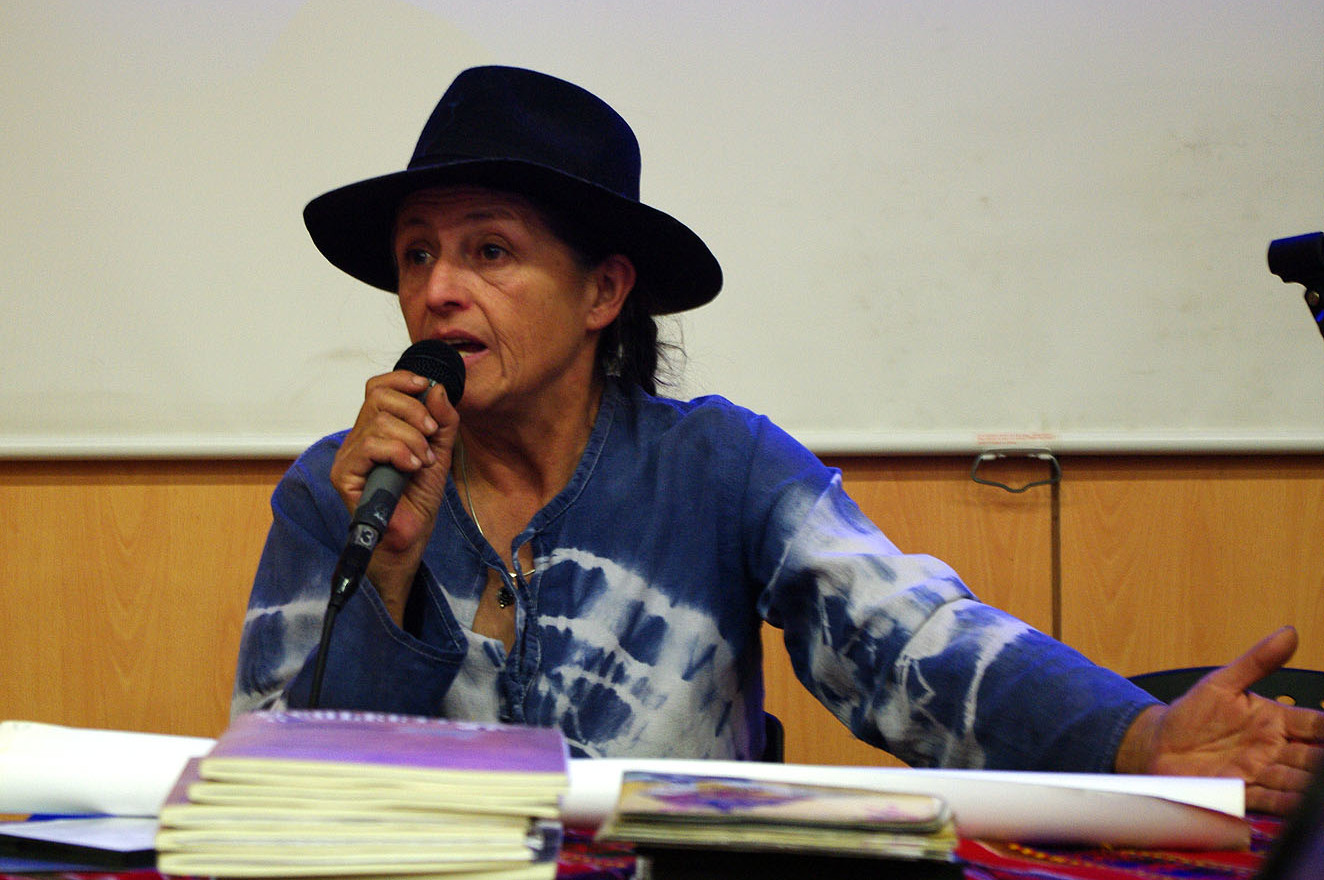
- Silvia Rivera in 2011
- Born: 17 April 1949 (age 76); La Paz, Bolivia

Silvia Rivera Cusicanqui (born 1949) is a Bolivian feminist, sociologist, historian, and subaltern theorist. She is emeritus Professor at the Universidad Mayor de San Andrés in La Paz, Bolivia, where she taught Sociology for over thirty years. She draws upon anarchist theory as well as Quechua and Aymara cosmologies. She is a former director and longtime member of the Taller de Historia Oral Andina (Workshop on Andean Oral History). The Taller de Historia Oral Andina has conducted an ongoing critique of Western epistemologies through writings and activism for nearly two decades. She is also an activist who works directly with indigenous movements in Bolivia, such as the Katarista movement and the coca growers movement.

Some of her best-known works include Oppressed But Not Defeated: Peasant Struggles Among the Aymara and Quechua in Bolivia, 1900–1980 (Geneva: UNRISD, 1984), Ch'ixinakax Utxiwa: A Reflection on the Practices and Discourses of Decolonization and The politics and ideology of the Colombian peasant movement: the case of ANUC (National Association of Peasant Smallholders).

There is a street named after her in Coquimbo, Chile. It is next to streets named after Emma Goldman, Teresa Montt and Rosa Luxemburg.

== Education ==
Cusicanqui earned a degree in sociology from the Universidad Mayor de San Andrés in 1976 and a master's degree in Social Sciences from Pontifical Catholic University of Peru in 1979.

== Bibliography ==
- Silvia Rivera Cusicanqui. 2023. Un mundo ch’ixi es posible. Ensayos desde un presente en crisis. Piedra Rota, 172 pp. ISBN 9789873687365.
- Silvia Rivera Cusicanqui. 2020. Ch'ixinakax utxiwa: On Decolonising Practices and Discourses. Polity, 80 pp. ISBN 9781509537822.
- Silvia Rivera Cusicanqui. 2015.Sociología de la Imagen: ensayos. Tinta Limón, 325 pp. ISBN 9789873687105.
- Silvia Rivera Cusicanqui. 2012. Violencia (re)encubiertas en Bolivia. Editor La Mirada Salvaje, 272 pp. ISBN 9789962052999.
- Silvia Rivera Cusicanqui. 2008. Pueblos originarios y estado. Vol. 2 de Gestión pública intercultural, Gestión pública intercultural. Azul Editores, 82 pp. ISBN 9789990598827.
- Silvia Rivera Cusicanqui. 2003. Las fronteras de la coca: epistemologías coloniales y circuitos alternativos de la hoja de coca: el caso de la frontera boliviano-Argentina. Editor IDIS, 198 pp.
- Silvia Rivera Cusicanqui. 2002. Bircholas: trabajo de mujeres: explotación capitalista o opresión colonial entre las migrantes aymaras de La Paz y El Alto. 2ª edición de Editorial Mama Huaco. 225 pp.
- Ramón Conde, Felipe Santos. 1992. Ayllus y Proyectos de Desarrollo en el Norte de Potosí. Serie ¿Cuál desarrollo?. Colaboró Univ. Mayor de San Andrés. Taller de Historia Oral Andina. Editor Aruwiyiri, 192 pp.
- Zulema Lehm, Silvia Rivera Cusicanqui. 1990. La Mujer andina en la historia. Nº 2 de Serie Cuadernos de formación. Colaboró Univ. Mayor de San Andrés. Taller de Historia Oral Andina. Ediciones del Thoa, 51 pp.
- Silvia Rivera Cusicanqui. 1988. Los artesanos libertarios y la ética del trabajo; Taller de Historia Oral Andina, La Paz.
- Silvia Rivera Cusicanqui. 1984. Oppressed But Not Defeated: Peasant Struggles Among the Aymara and Quechua in Bolivia, 1900–1980 (Oprimidos pero no Derrotados: la Lucha Campesina Entre los Aimaras y Quechuas en Bolivia). Ginebra: UNRISD, xiii + 222 pp.
