= Julio de la Vega =

Bolivian poet and writer

- Born: 4 March 1924; Puerto Suarez, Santa Cruz, Bolivia
- Died: 11 November 2010 (aged 86)
- Occupations: Poet, writer, educator
- Years active: 1940s–2010
- Known for: Founder of Gesta Bárbara, Poemario de exaltaciones, Matías, el apóstol suplente
- Notable work: Matías, el apóstol suplente
- Awards: Flor Natural Prize (1947), Premio Franz Tamayo (1966), Premio Erich Guttentag (1969), Pablo Neruda Medal (2004), National Culture Award (2005)

Julio de la Vega (4 March 1924 – 11 November 2010) was a Bolivian poet and writer.

He died in 2010.
