= Blanca Wiethüchter =

Bolivian writer, historian, and publisher (1947–2004)

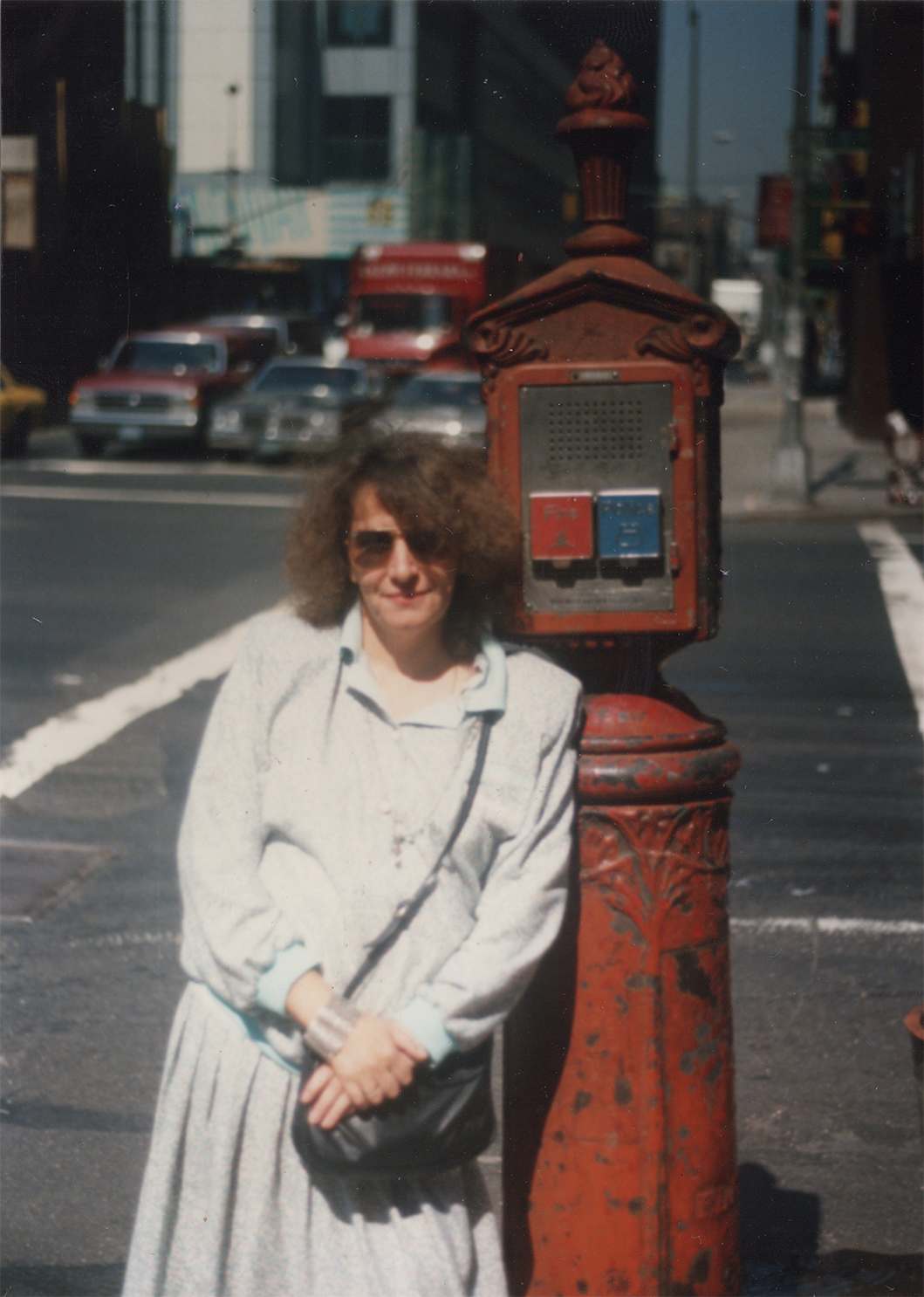

Blanca Wiethüchter López (La Paz, August 17, 1947 – Cochabamba, October 16, 2004) was a Bolivian writer, historian, and publisher. She became one of the most enigmatic and recognized authors of Bolivian literature in the 20th and 21st centuries. She published essays, short stories, and poems. Hers was one of the iconic female voices of Bolivian poetry of the late 20th century. Her writing spanned three decades, from the mid-1970s until her death in 2004.

== Biography ==
Her parents were German immigrants. She graduated in Letters from the Higher University of San Andrés and in Learning sciences from the Sorbonne; she earned a Master's degree in Latin American Literature at the University of Paris. Wiethüchter was editor of the cultural supplement in "La Hormiga Eléctrica" in of the literary magazines Hipótesis and Piedra Imán. She served as editorial director of "Hombrecito sentado" and "Mujercita Sentada"; and was the co-founder of the cultural space Puraduralubia (1993). She taught at the Catholic University of Bolivia and the Higher University of San Andrés.

Wiethüchter was married to the composer Alberto Villalpando, and they had three daughters. She died in Cochabamba in 2004, and her ashes were strewn on Lake Titicaca.

== Selected works ==
=== Poetry ===
- Asistir al tiempo, 1975
- Travesía, 1978
- Noviembre 79, 1979
- Madera viva y árbol difunto, 1982
- Territorial, 1983
- El verde no es un color: A la luz de una provincia tropical, 1992
- Los negros labios encantados, 1992
- El rigor de la llama, 1994
- La Lagarta, 1995
- 'Sayariy', 1995
- Qantatai (o Iluminado), 1996
- Antología La Piedra que labra otra piedra, 1999
- Ítaca, 2000
- Luminar, 2005
- Ángeles del miedo, 2005

=== Short stories ===
- Memoria Solicitada, 1989
- En el aire de navegación de las montañas, 1992
- A manera de Prólogo, 1993

=== Novel ===
- El jardín de Nora 1998

=== Essays ===
- La Estructura de lo Imaginario en la Obra Poética de Jaime Saenz, 1976
- Hacia una historia crítica de la literatura en Bolivia I y II, 2002
- Pérez Alcalá, o los melancólicos senderos del tiempo, 1997
