= Gil Imaná =

Bolivian muralist and painter (1933–2021)

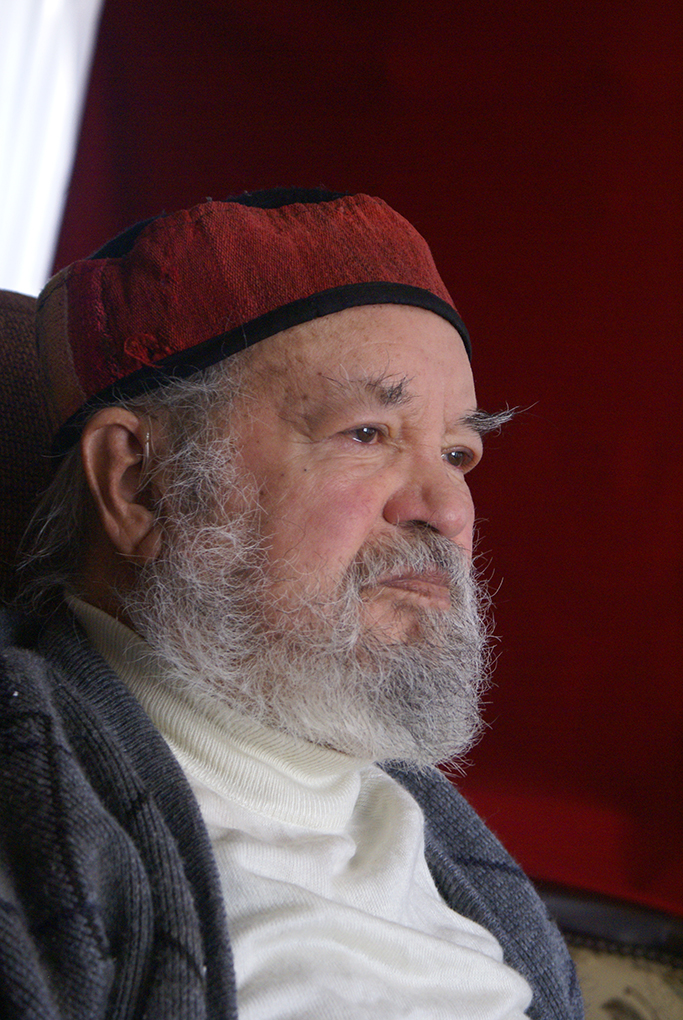
- Gil Imaná in 2016
- Born: Gil Imaná Garrón; July 16, 1933; Sucre, Republic of Bolivia
- Died: January 28, 1932; La Paz, Bolivia
- Known for: Painting, murals
- Spouse: Inés Córdova

Gil Imaná Garrón (16 July 1933 – 28 January 2021) was a Bolivian muralist and painter. He was the first Latin American artist to have a solo exhibition at Hermitage Museum in St. Petersburg, Russia in 1971.

He was the first Bolivian painter whose work was sold at Christie's and Sotheby's auction houses. In 2014, he received the highest distinction granted by the State of Bolivia, the Order of the Condor of the Andes in the rank of Knight.

== Awards and honors ==
- 1961 Primer Premio del X Salón de la ‘Revolución Nacional’ La Paz
- 1961 Primer Premio en pintura del Salón Murillo por su obra ‘Paisaje de La Paz’
- 1973 Primer Premio en grabado del Salón Murillo. La Paz
- 1985 Primer Premio de grabado Salón Pedro Domingo Murillo y medalla de oro en mérito a toda su obra artística.
- 1994 Premio de Cultura de la Fundación ‘Manuel Vicente Ballivián’
- 1994 “Caballero de la Orden de Artes y letras del Gobierno de Francia”.
- 2002 Nominado por la Cruz Roja Internacional como ‘Artista por la Humanidad’ Argentina
- 2004 Premio a la Obra de vida por la Alcaldía de La Paz
- 2004 Premio Nacional de Cultura por el Estado Boliviano
- Medalla al mérito, Pablo Neruda, Ministerio de Cultura de Chile.
- 2014 Orden del Cóndor de los Andes en el grado de Caballero.
