= René Zavaleta Mercado =

Bolivian sociologist, politician, and philosopher (1937–1984)

- Born: March 6, 1937; Oruro, Bolivia
- Died: December 23, 1984 (aged 47); Mexico City, Mexico
- Scientific career
- Fields: Sociology

René Zavaleta Mercado (3 June 1937 – 23 December 1984) was a Bolivian sociologist, politician and philosopher.

Zavaleta was an extremely influential Bolivian thinker of the second half of the twentieth century. His thought is usually divided into three periods: the first nationalist, followed by an orthodox Marxist phase, and finally his more influential unorthodox Marxism from a uniquely Bolivian perspective. Concepts originating from his work are fundamental to later development in Bolivian social sciences. Notable concepts such as "sociedad abigarrada" (roughly translated "motley society"), meaning a society juxtaposed by asymmetric relations of differentiated cultural power and its respective modes of production. Additionally considered important are Zavaleta's meaning of the terms "mases" ("masses") and "multitude". Today his work is considered essential for understanding the reality of Bolivian cultural, political, and social life.

As a politician, René Zavaleta was the Minister of Mines and Petroleum during the revolutionary government of the Revolutionary Nationalist Movement (MNR). He also acted as a diplomat for Bolivia to Uruguay and Chile. As an academic, he studied at the University of San Andrés (UMSA) in La Paz, the University of Oxford, and was the director of the Latin American Social Sciences Institute (FLACSO), in Mexico.

== Publications ==
In Spanish:

- Estado nacional o pueblo de pastores (1956),
- Crecimiento de la idea nacional (19xx),
- 50 años de historia (19xx),
- El poder dual en América Latina: estudio de los casos de Bolivia y Chile (1974),
- Bolivia: Hoy (1982),
- Lo nacional-popular en Bolivia (1986)
- La Caída del M.N.R. y la Conjuración de Noviembre. La Paz: Los Amigos del Libro. 1995. ISBN 84-8370-214-2.
