= Juan de Santa Gertrudis =

Juan de Santa Gertrudis (1724 in Mallorca – August 8, 1799 in Mallorca) was a Spanish Franciscan missionary.

== Biography ==
Juan de Santa Gertrudis was sent as a missionary to South America in 1757 and between 1758 and 1767 during his evangelizing, he founded a mission in Putumayo Department called Agustinillo. He crossed the southern territory of New Granada, especially the province of Popayan, with some travel to Quito and Bogota.

Following this experience in America, he returned to Spain, where he wrote his most important work titled "Maravillas de la Naturaleza" (in English: "Wonders of Nature") in four volumes which reveals the mentality of a religious man fascinated with nature. Through his writings it is possible to have a vision of life in southern New Granada during the 18th century different from that provided by the study of official documents or chronicles of the conquest. He spent his last years in Mallorca where he died on August 8.

== Works ==
- Maravillas de la naturaleza (first published 1956, Read online)
- Medicina Luliana; comments on the work of Raymundo Lulio.
- The Virtud palacio en su; a compilation of his sermons
