= Juan José Torres =

50th President of Bolivia

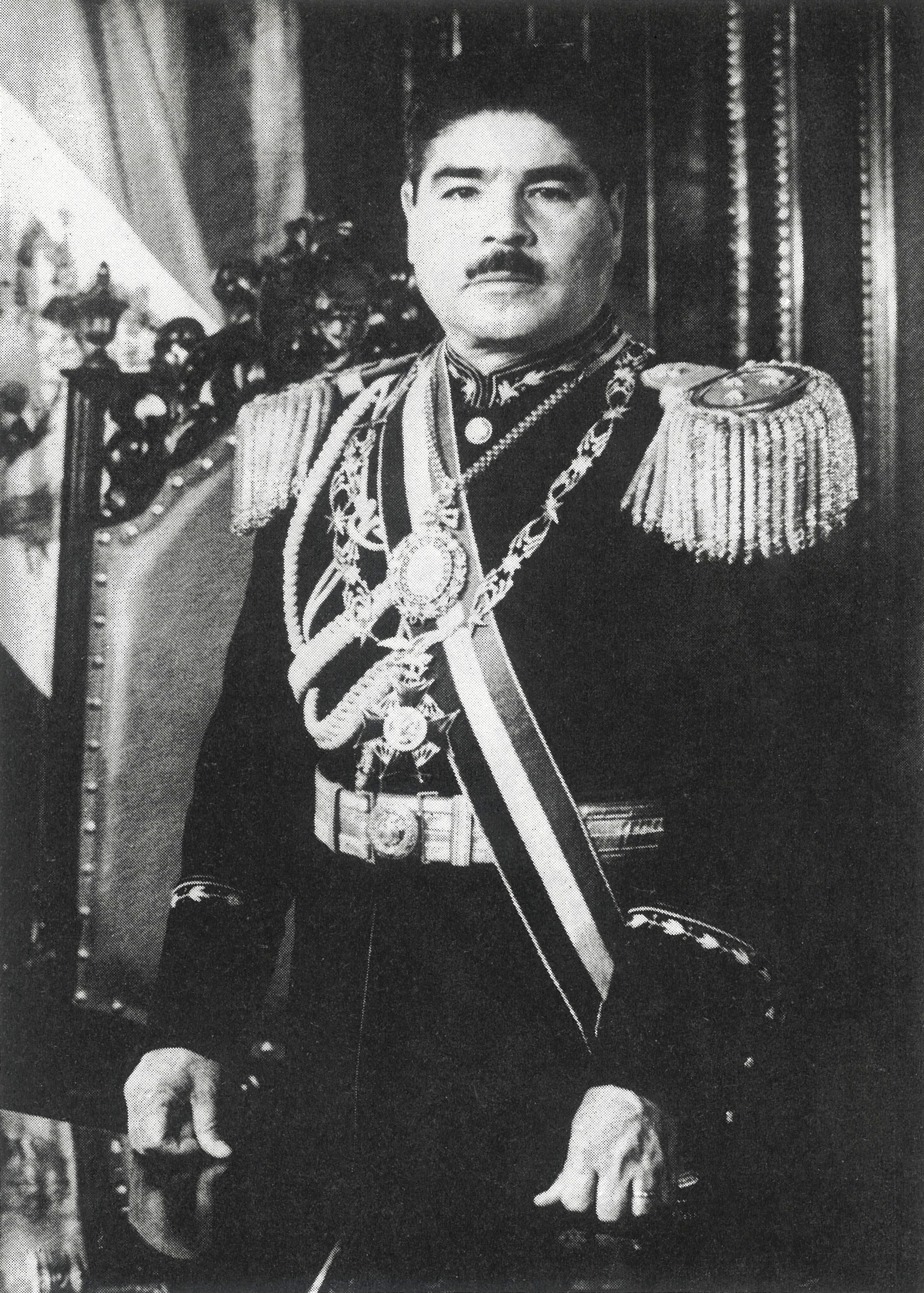
- Portrait by Antonio Eguino, c. 1970–1971

50th President of Bolivia
- In office 7 October 1970 – 21 August 1971
- Vice President: Vacant
- Preceded by: Alfredo Ovando
- Succeeded by: Hugo Banzer

Minister of Work and Social Security
- In office 31 March 1966 – 6 August 1966
- President: Alfredo Ovando
- Preceded by: Samuel Gallardo Lozada
- Succeeded by: Vicente Mendoza Nava

Minister of Finance and Statistics
- In office 5 November 1964 – 6 November 1964
- President: René Barrientos
- Preceded by: Jaime Escobar Quiroga
- Succeeded by: Carlos Alcoreza Melgarejo

Personal details
- Born: Juan José Torres González; 5 March 1920 Cochabamba, Bolivia
- Died: 2 June 1976 (aged 56) San Andrés de Giles, Buenos Aires, Argentina
- Cause of death: Assassination
- Resting place: La Paz, Bolivia
- Party: Alliance of the National Left
- Spouse: Emma Obleas Eguino
- Children: Emma Sabina; Juan José; Jorge; Juan Carlos
- Parent(s): Juan Torres Cueto; Sabina González
- Education: Military College of the Army

Military service
- Allegiance: Bolivia
- Branch/service: Bolivian Army
- Years of service: 1941–1970
- Rank: General

Juan José Torres González (5 March 1920 – 2 June 1976) was a Bolivian socialist politician and military leader who served as the 50th president of Bolivia from 1970 to 1971, when he was ousted in a US-backed coup that resulted in the dictatorship of Hugo Banzer. He was popularly known as "J.J." (Jota-Jota). He went into exile in Argentina. Torres was assassinated in 1976 in Buenos Aires, likely by agents associated with the Argentine regime of Jorge Rafael Videla. It has also been alleged that it was done with acquiescence of Hugo Banzer as part of Operation Condor.

== Early life ==
Torres was born in Cochabamba to a poor Aymara-Mestizo family and joined the army in 1941. He served as military attache to Brazil from 1964 and as ambassador to Uruguay from 1965 to 1966, when he was appointed Labor Minister.

He became the reform-minded Alfredo Ovando's right-hand man and commander-in-chief of the armed forces when the latter came to power as a result of a coup d'état in September 1969. Torres became one of the more left-leaning officers in the Bolivian military, urging Ovando to enact more far-reaching reforms and to stand up to the more conservative officers. As a member of the nationalist and reformist movement of the army, he denounced capitalism because he believed it perpetuates the country's underdevelopment and dependence on foreign countries. In 1969, he had been one of the main protagonists in the nationalization of the Gulf Oil and had participated in the occupation of the company's headquarters in La Paz. On October 6, 1970, an anti-government coup d'état took place, led by right-wing military commanders. Much blood was shed on the streets of various major cities, with military garrisons fighting each other on behalf of one camp or the other. Eventually, President Ovando sought asylum in a foreign embassy, believing all hope was lost. But the leftist military forces re-asserted themselves under the combative leadership of general Torres, and eventually triumphed. Worn out by 13 grueling months in office, Ovando agreed to leave the presidency in the hands of his friend, general Torres. The latter was sworn in and went on to govern the country for 10 difficult and tumultuous months.

== Presidency ==
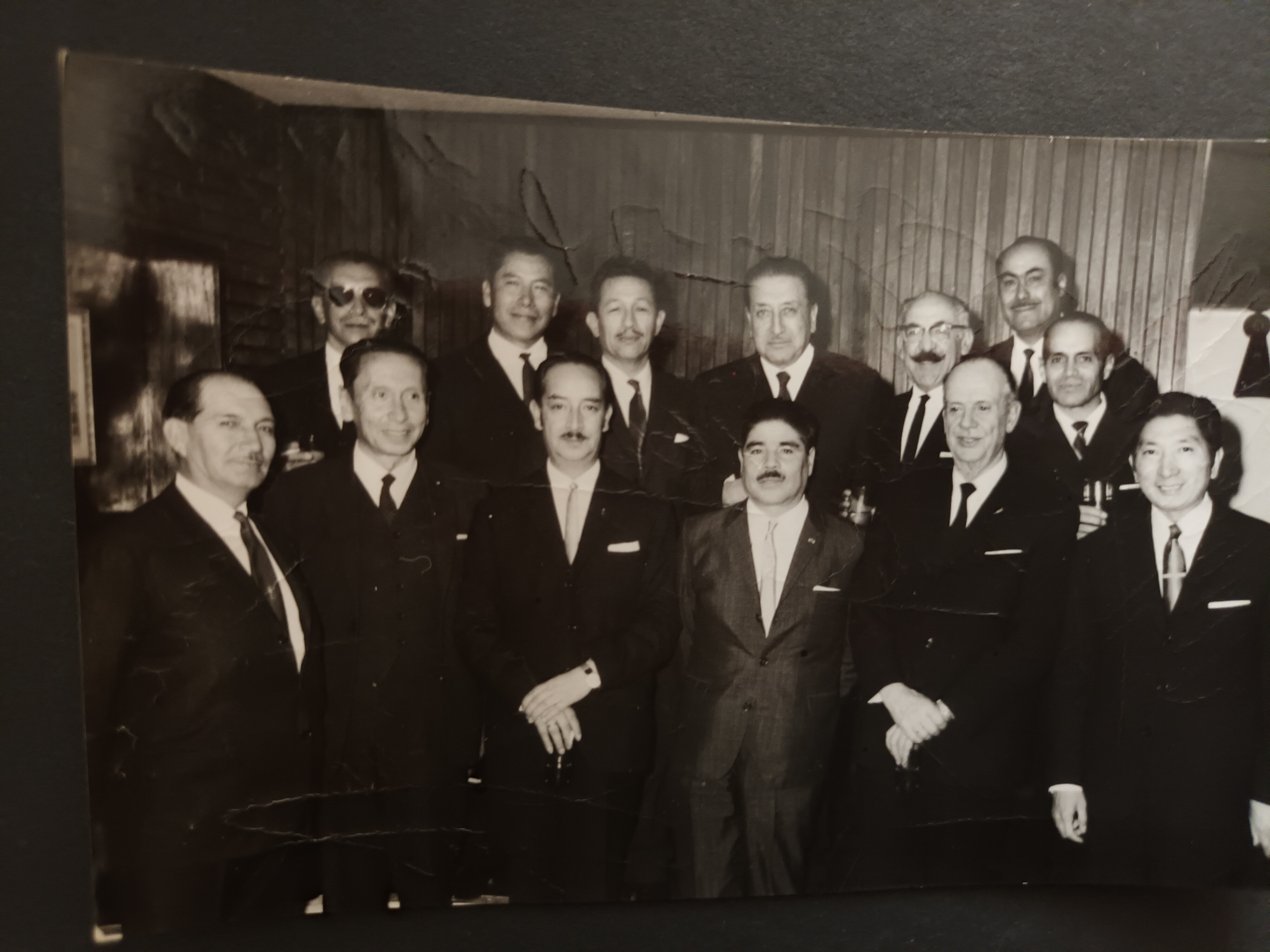
General Torres with a group of friends, including then Colonel Hernán Terrazas Céspedes in the back.

Though most military leaders throughout Latin American history have been associated with right-wing politics, Torres - like his contemporaries Juan Velasco in Peru and Omar Torrijos in Panama - was decidedly left wing. He was known as a man of the people and was popular in some sectors of Bolivian society. His mestizo and even native-Andean features enhanced his standing with the poorer sectors of society. Despite Torres' best intentions, his marked leftward drift did not stabilize the country. He called an Asamblea del Pueblo, or People's Assembly, in which representatives of specific "proletarian" sectors of society were represented (miners, unionized teachers, students, peasants). The Assembly was imbued with all the powers of a working parliament, even though opponents of the government tended to call it a gathering of "virtual soviets". Torres also allowed the legendary (and Trotskyist-oriented) labor leader, Juan Lechín, to resume his post as head of the Central Obrera Boliviana/Bolivian Workers' Union (COB) and to operate without a single restraint. To his surprise, Lechín proceeded to cripple the government with strikes.

In his first speech as Head of State, he specified the direction of his government: "We will promote the alliance of the armed forces with the people and build nationality on four pillars: workers, academics, peasants and the military. We will not separate the people from their armed arm and impose a nationalist-revolutionary government that will not surrender, will defend natural resources, if necessary at the cost of its own life." It established a People's Assembly, similar to a soviet, which met in Parliament; expropriated the sugar industry; began negotiations with the Chilean government of Salvador Allende in order to obtain Bolivian access to the sea; granted an amnesty for those former rebels who had not been murdered after their capture (including Régis Debray); increased the university budget and called for the closure of the United States Strategic Communications Centre (known as Guantanamito).

In 1970, Torres attended a conference of the Non-Aligned Movement, a first for a Bolivian leader.

He nationalized some American-owned property, such as the Matilde zinc mine, and ordered the US Peace Corps out of the country. However, he also negotiated with the US regarding the Gulf Oil holdings seized under the previous administration, agreeing to uphold a deal that would've had Bolivia pay $78.5 million to Gulf Oil, which the company accepted.

His government was quickly subjected to external pressure. US Ambassador Ernest V. Siracusa (who participated in the coup d'état against Jacobo Arbenz in Guatemala in 1954, then was expelled from Peru in 1968, accused of being a CIA man) ordered him to change his policy, threatening him with financial blockage. The World Bank and the Inter-American Development Bank refused to grant Bolivia the loans necessary to pursue industrial development work. But his government was not stable, because it was supported only by a minority of the army and the country's middle class. The wealthy classes, part of the army, the right wing of the MNR and the Phalangist party plotted against him. When he cut military spending to finance education, this increased resentment within the army. Torres was removed from power in a coup led by right wing general Hugo Banzer on August 21, 1971. The United States transferred money to individuals involved in the coup. The Banzer Administration would agree to pay the Gulf Oil Company $100 million instead of the $78.5 million agreed upon under Torres.

== Exile ==
After less than a year in power, Torres was overthrown in a bloody coup d'état, which was led by the colonel Hugo Banzer and supported by the Brazilian military regime. Despite massive resistance — both civilian and military — the conservative forces had learned the lessons of the failed October 6, 1970 uprising, and applied brutality without compunction. Hugo Banzer became president and ruled the country for the next seven years.

== Assassination ==
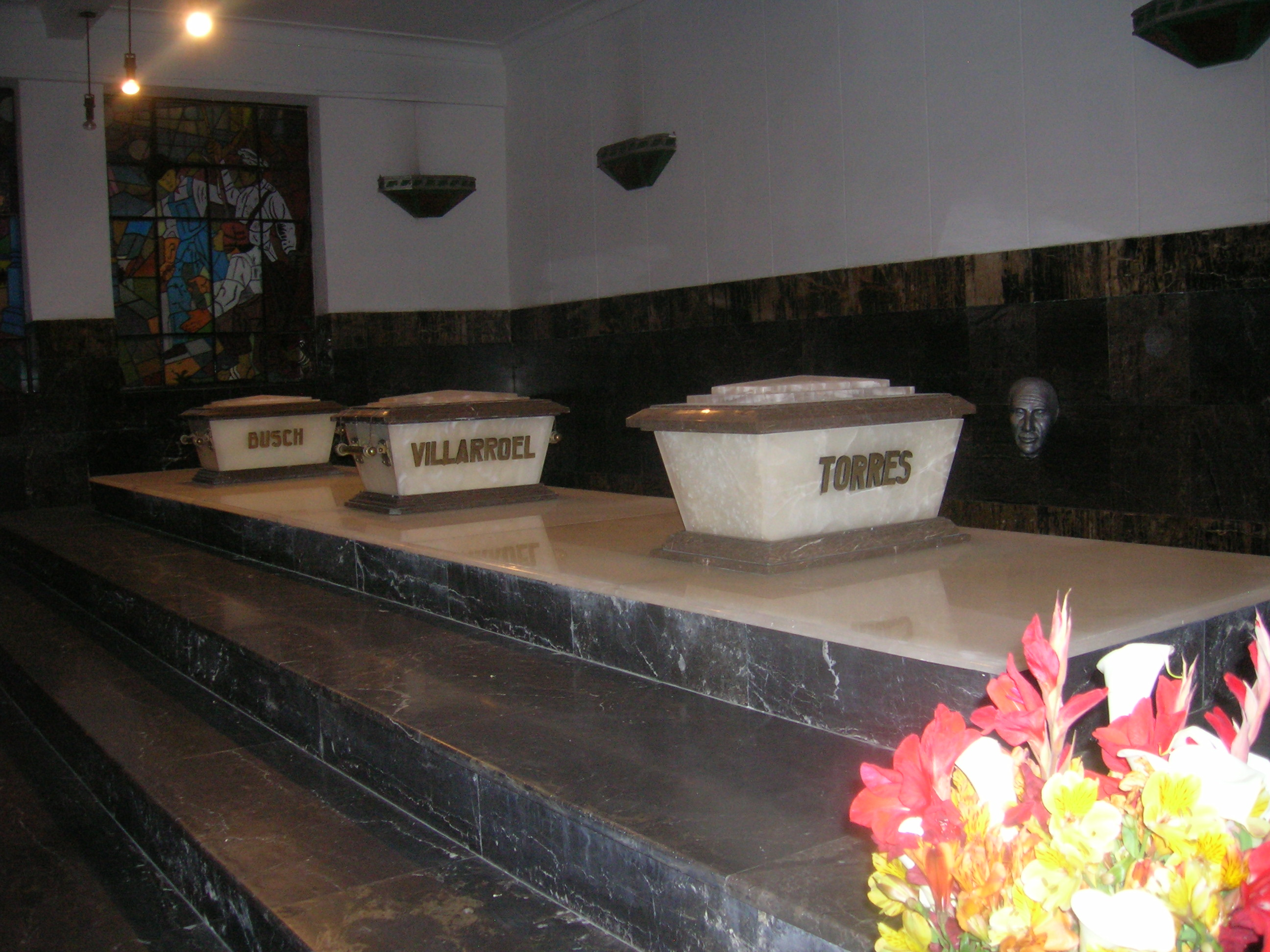
Mausoleum with Presidents Torres, Villarroel, and Busch at Plaza Villaroel in the Monument to the National Revolution in La Paz.

When Banzer came to power, Torres fled the country and settled in Buenos Aires. He remained there even after the March 1976 coup that brought General Jorge Videla to power in Argentina. In early June 1976, Torres was kidnapped and shot to death. His assassination was most likely directly carried out by right-wing death squads associated with the Videla government, but also — it has been argued — with the acquiescence of Hugo Banzer and as part of the broader US-backed Operation Condor. His body was left under a bridge about 100 kilometers east of Buenos Aires.

In 1983, his body was repatriated to Bolivia.

== See also ==
- Government of Juan José Torres, 1970-1971
- Operation Condor

Political offices
Preceded by Jaime Escobar Quiroga	Minister of Finance and Statistics; 1964	Succeeded by Carlos Alcoreza Melgarejo
Preceded by Samuel Gallardo Lozada	Minister of Work and Social Security; 1966	Succeeded by Vicente Mendoza Nava
Preceded by Alfredo Ovando Candía	President of Bolivia; 1970–1971	Succeeded by Hugo Banzer
