= Pedro Shimose =

Bolivian poet, journalist, professor and essayist (born 1940)

- Born: 30 March 1940 (age 86); Riberalta, Beni, Bolivia
- Education: Complutense University of Madrid
- Occupations: Poet, journalist, professor, essayist
- Writing career
- Language: Spanish
- Notable works: Quiero escribir, pero me sale espuma
- Notable awards: Casa de las Américas Prize; National Culture Award

Pedro Shimose Kawamura (born 30 March 1940) is a poet, journalist, professor and essayist from Bolivia. He has been based in Madrid, Spain since 1971. Shimose is considered one of Bolivia's most notable poets.

== Biography ==
Shimose was born in 1940 to Japanese-Bolivian parents in the town of Riberalta in the lowland Beni department. He studied at the Higher University of San Andrés in La Paz, Bolivia, and graduated from the Complutense University of Madrid in Spain.

He specialized in journalism and worked for some time on the newspaper Presencia. He also taught at the Higher University of San Andrés.

In 1972, he was awarded the Casa de las Américas Prize for the poetry collection Quiero escribir, pero me sale espuma ("I want to write, but all that comes out is bubbly froth"). In 1999, he received Bolivia's National Culture Award. He is a member of the Academia Boliviana de la Lengua and of the Spanish Association of Art Critics.

Shimose is best known for his politically inspired poetry which touches on the themes of national identity and social liberation.

== Bibliography ==
Since Triludio en el exilio ("Triludio in exile") was first released in 1961, eight further poetry collections by Shimose have been published: Sardonia ("Isle of Snark"), Poemas para un pueblo ("Poems for a people"), Caducidad del fuego ("Fire's expiration date"), Al pie de la letra ("Letter of the law"), Reflexiones maquiavélicas ("Machiavellian reflections"), Bolero de caballería ("Calvary jacket"), Riberalta, and Poemas ("Poems"). Other publications include a book of short stories, El Coco se llama Drilo ("The boogeyman's name is Drilo"), and a Diccionario de autores iberoamericanos ("Dictionary of Latin American authors").

== Works ==
- Triludio en el exilio (1961)
- Sardonia (1967)
- Poemas para un pueblo (1968)
- Quiero escribir, pero me sale espuma(1972)
- Caducidad del fuego (1975)
- Al pie de la letra (1976)
- El Coco se llama Drilo (stories, 1976)
- Reflexiones maquiavélicas (1980)
- Diccionario de Autores Iberoamericanos (1982)
- Bolero de caballería (1985)
- Poemas (1988; collects poetry from his previous books)
- Historia de la literatura hispanoamericana (1989)
- Riberalta y otros poemas (1996)
- No te lo vas a creer (2000)

== Awards ==
- Casa de las Américas Prize in 1972
- National Culture Award in 1999
