= Denis Chapon =

- Born: 1983 (age 42–43); France
- Education: École Émile Cohl; La Poudrière
- Occupations: Director, animator, illustrator, educator
- Known for: Abuela Grillo (2009)

Denis Chapon (born 1983) is a French animated film director, animator, illustrator, and teacher.

He is primarily known for co-directing the socially focused short film Abuela Grillo (2009), and for his work in animation training and international collaboration, particularly in Denmark and Bolivia.

== Biography ==
Denis Chapon was born in France in 1983. He grew up on a traditional farm (mas) in the Cévennes region, where he developed an early affinity for observational drawing and fauna.

=== Education ===
He completed his animation training in France:

- Lycée des Arts Appliqués de Nîmes (cartoon drawing).
- École Émile Cohl in Lyon, where he graduated in 2005.
- La Poudrière in Valence, Drôme, the European Animated Film School, from which he graduated in 2007 with the film Babette La Coquillette.

After graduating in 2007, he moved to Denmark to develop animated TV series and films. He worked as an illustrator, animator, and teacher at The Animation Workshop in Viborg, Denmark, where he regularly taught animation until 2021. He also taught in Africa and South America. In 2021, he returned to France to focus on teaching and independent animation directing.

=== Career and International Collaboration ===
A fundamental part of Chapon's career has centered on developing training programs in animation techniques in countries with limited industry experience, such as Burkina Faso and Bolivia.

In 2017, Chapon created and directed the Andimation project with support from UNESCO, aiming to promote the animation industry in the Andean region. He has been a key promoter of programs that seek to train local artists.

==== Abuela Grillo (2009) ====
His most well-known work is the short film Abuela Grillo (Grandmother Cricket), which he co-directed with a team of Bolivian animators. The film, based on the Ayoreo legend of Direjná, the owner of the water, addresses the privatization of water and the defense of natural resources.

The project was an initiative of The Animation Workshop which provided scholarships for eight Bolivian animators to produce the film in Denmark under Chapon's direction. The team of Bolivian animators included: Cecilia Delgado, Miguel Sequeiros, Milton Salazar, Susana Villegas, Alejandro Salazar (Al-Azar), Rubén Rocha, Salvador Pérez, and Mauricio Toledo.

The short film has been screened at numerous international festivals and environmental conferences.

==== Contaminated Stories ====
Chapon also co-directed the animated short film series Contaminated Stories (Contes toxiques) with the Bolivian cartoonist Alejandro Salazar (Al-Azar). This collection of five chapters presents an ironic view of human behaviors that threaten existence.

=== Illustration and Publishing Work ===
As an illustrator, Chapon is the author of the flip-books series Flips Parades for the French publisher FLBLB. The books focus on the nuptial parade of endangered animals, such as the Blue whale, Hummingbird, and Giant tortoise, using watercolor on rag paper. His work seeks to raise awareness of species extinction caused by human activities, drawing parallels between animal and human courtship rituals.

In 2020, the story of *Abuela Grillo* was adapted and published as an illustrated book.

== Selected filmography ==
- 4L Love (Graduation short film, 2005) - Director/Animator
- Babette La Coquillette (Graduation short film, 2007) - Director/Animator
- Abuela Grillo (Short film, 2009) - Director.
- 12 Drawings A Day (Experimental short film, Denmark, 2011) - Director/Animator
- L'odeur de la forêt (Short film, 2011) - Animator
- Contaminated Stories (Contes toxiques) (Short film series) - Co-director.
- L'Homme et le Poison (Short film) - Director/Animator
