= Abuela Grillo =

2009 animated short film by Denis Chapon

- Directed by: Denis Chapon
- Written by: Students of the La Paz Animation Workshop 2009, Alfredo Ovando, Denis Chapon, Israel Hernández
- Based on: Adaptation of an Ayoreo myth
- Produced by: Hanne Pedersen, Israel Hernández, Hanna Habermann
- Starring: Voice: Luzmila Carpio
- Edited by: Salvador Pomar, Miguel Mealla, Joaquín Cuevas
- Music by: Luzmila Carpio, Uma Churita, Pablo Pico, Galo Cortés, Hernán Ponce
- Animation by: Alejandro Salazar, Cecilia Delgado, Joaquín Cuevas, Mauricio Sejas, Miguel Mealla, Román Nina, Salvador Pomar, and Susana Villegas
- Production companies: The Animation Workshop, Center Animation Pedagogic
- Distributed by: Creative Commons (CC BY-NC-ND)
- Release date: 2009
- Running time: 13 minutes
- Countries: Bolivia; Denmark
- Language: Spanish

Abuela Grillo (Spanish for "Grandmother Cricket") is a 2009 Bolivian-Danish animated short film. It was directed by French animator Denis Chapon and is based on the Ayoreo myth of the Direjná, the ancestral owner of water and rain.

The film quickly became an icon of Latin American social cinema due to its strong critique of water privatization and the exploitation of natural resources, making a clear allusion to the Cochabamba Water War (Guerra del Agua) in Cochabamba, Bolivia, in 2000. The titular character is voiced and sung by Bolivian musician Luzmila Carpio.

== Synopsis ==
The film narrates the story of Abuela Grillo, a figure from Ayoreo mythology who possesses the gift of bringing rain through her song. When a drought strikes her village, she sings and rain falls, but her continuous presence eventually becomes a nuisance, leading to her expulsion from the community.

Wandering alone, Abuela Grillo encounters unscrupulous entrepreneurs who discover her gift and decide to exploit it for their own profit. These "water merchants" lock her up and channel her song into a company that sells bottled water at exorbitant prices, profiting from the population's need. The oppressed Abuela ultimately unleashes a great flood, symbolizing a protest against the commodification of the vital water resource.

== Production and crew ==
The Abuela Grillo project began as a collaboration between the Danish production school The Animation Workshop, the Bolivian studios Nicobis, Escorzo, Demiurgo and Renderet, and the Danish entities Center for Kultur og Udvikling (CKU/DCCD), the Royal Danish Embassy in Bolivia and Via University College in Denmark. The initiative had a strong training component aimed at boosting the animation industry in Bolivia.

The team was led by French director Denis Chapon and composed of eight Bolivian animators, who were selected from a group of **23 Bolivian animators** who attended the La Paz Animation Workshop 2009, and received a scholarship to complete the production in Viborg, Denmark.

=== Detailed crew list ===
The film's production and animation team reflected the binational collaboration between Bolivia and Denmark:

- Director: Denis Chapon.
- Project Director: Hanne Pedersen.
- Executive Production: Center Animation Pedagogic.
- Production: Israel Hernández, Hanna Habermann.
- Screenplay: Alfredo Ovando, Denis Chapon, and Israel Hernández, with the collaboration of the students of the La Paz Animation Workshop 2009.
- Storyboard: Denis Chapon.
- Animation Director: Joaquín Cuevas.
- Scene Director: Salvador Pomar.
- Animation: Alejandro Salazar, Cecilia Delgado, Joaquín Cuevas, Mauricio Sejas, Miguel Mealla, Román Nina, Salvador Pomar, and Susana Villegas.
- Character Design: Denis Chapon, Israel Hernández, Mauricio Sejas, Miguel Mealla, Cecilia Delgado, Joaquín Cuevas.
- Backgrounds and Line Design: Alejandro Salazar.
- Color and Backgrounds Design: Román Nina, Susana Villegas, Alejandro Salazar, Salvador Pomar.
- Character Supervision and Line Clean-up: Cecilia Delgado.
- Music: Featured contributions from Luzmila Carpio (Lyrics and Melody), Pablo Pico (Musical Direction, Composition, and Arrangements), Uma Churita (Themes and Compositions), Galo Cortés, and Hernán Ponce (Guest Musicians).
- Editing (Compositing): Salvador Pomar, Miguel Mealla, and Joaquín Cuevas.
- Sound Editing: Miguel Mealla and Denis Chapon.

The Bolivian singer Luzmila Carpio, then ambassador of Bolivia to France, provided the voice for the main character and performed the Abuela Grillo's song.

=== Students of the La Paz Animation Workshop 2009 ===
The Students of the La Paz Animation Workshop 2009 were: Mati Quiroga, Fer Suárez, Edgar Choque, David Vargas, Donato Fernández, Gary Ibáñez, Aracely Gonzáles, Ingrid Schulze, Alex Muñoz, Tati Ovando, Ficho Averanga, Oscar Quevedo, Vania de Lucca, Claudio Araya, Waldo Dávila.

== Themes and distribution ==
The film was released in 2009. Its theme directly relates to the Cochabamba Water War that occurred nine years earlier, a seminal event in the struggle for public control of water resources in Bolivia.

The short film had a unique and impactful distribution strategy: it was released under a specific Creative Commons license (CC BY-NC-ND) for free and non-commercial dissemination. This decision allowed the film to go viral quickly, serving as pedagogical and awareness material in environmental campaigns, forums, and schools across Latin America and Spain.

== Awards and recognition ==
- UNICEF Award in the animation category (2010).
- First Prize at the Prix Jeunesse Iberoamericano Festival (2011).
- It has been screened at numerous festivals and exhibitions focusing on social and environmental cinema.

=== Book adaptation ===
In 2020, due to its enduring relevance and educational message, the *Abuela Grillo* story was adapted and published as an illustrated book in Spanish and Catalan, with text by Lily Caballero and illustrations by Denis Chapon.

== See also ==
- Water privatization in Bolivia
- The Animation Workshop
- Susana Villegas Arroyo
