= Cece Delgado =

Bolivian comics artist and writer (born 20th century)

Cecilia Delgado
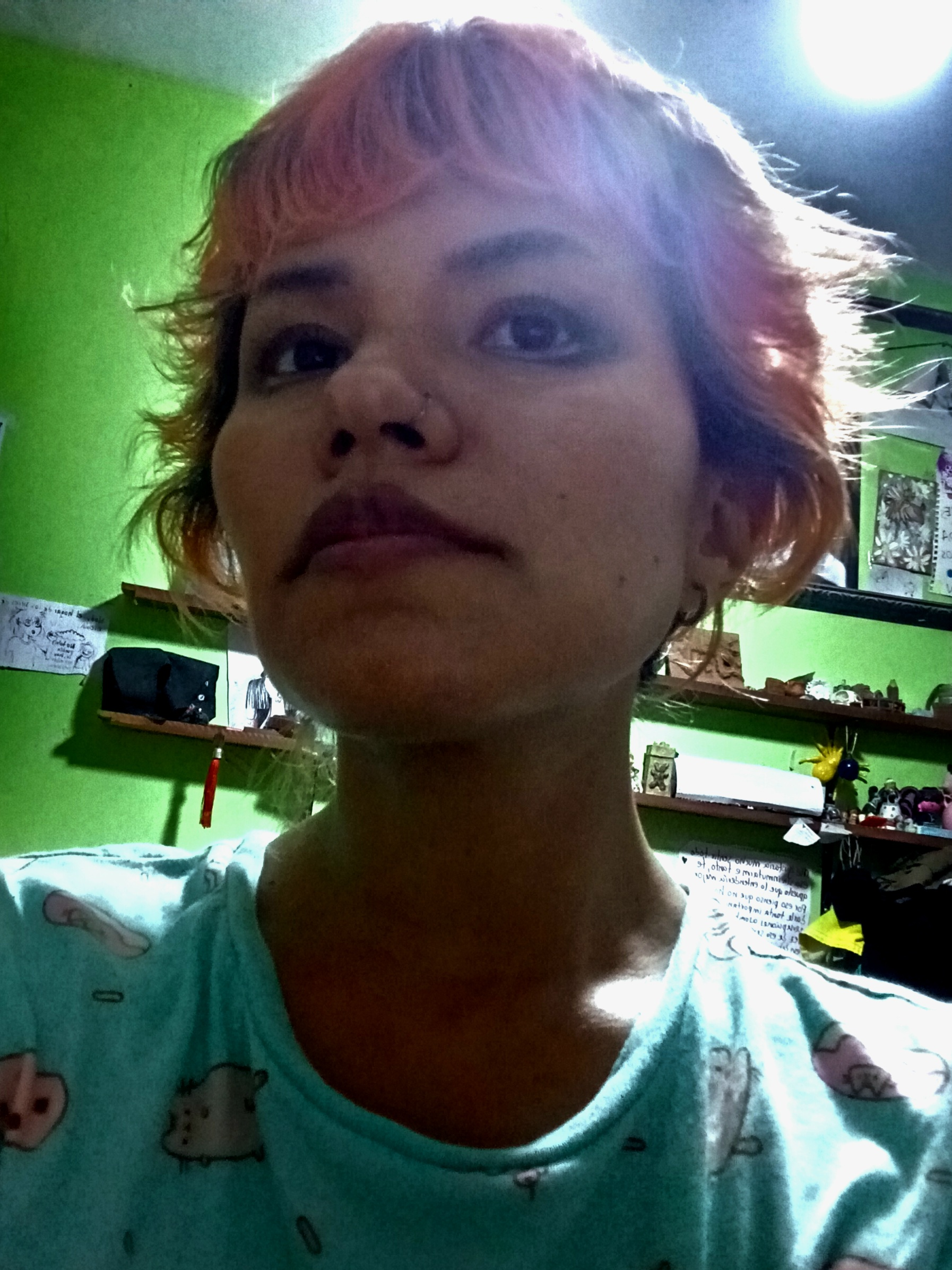
- Delgago, 2025
- Born: La Paz, Bolivia
- Education: The Animation Workshop
- Occupations: Artist (comics artist and writer)

Cece Delgado is a Bolivian artist who writes and draws comics.

She was born in La Paz, Bolivia, but grew up, studied, and works in the city of Santa Cruz de la Sierra.

== Career ==
Delgado published her first comics in Bolivian magazines in 2007.

In 2009, she won a scholarship with seven other young Bolivian artists to participate in a cultural exchange and be part of The Animation Workshop in Viborg, Denmark. This experience led to the production of a short firm called La Abuela Grillo.

In 2010, Delgado presented her first Keila and Keisy comic at an opening event for Comics Week at the Simon I Center. With this comic, she had developed a saga of stories with these characters, between the art and the narrative. In 2012, a short film version of this project won a prize for best short national film at the International Film Festival of Santa Cruz (FENAVID).

In 2016, she published a book of stories, titled El viaje de la noche, in which she explores a fantasy narrative with philosophical themes. The stories are accompanied with her own images, in a style inspired by the works of William Blake.

In 2019, Delgado introduced the experimental comic Drama Pink, a collaboration with the Mexican artist Stephanie Clark. In Drama Pink, they explore diverse concepts related to autism and the feminine perspective.

== Personal life ==
Delgado was diagnosed with Asperger syndrome in 2019.

== See also ==
- Susana Villegas Arroyo (another Bolivian comics creator)
