= Susana Villegas Arroyo =

Bolivian artist, illustrator, and 3D modeler

Susana Villegas
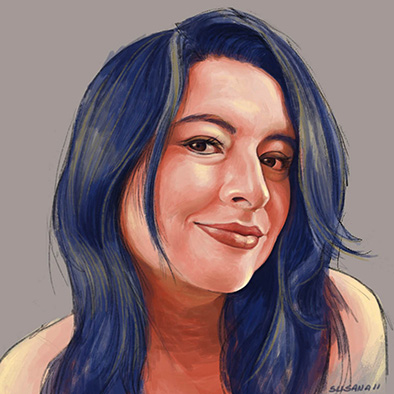
- Self portrait digital painting
- Born: Susana Villegas Arroyo; 1975 (age 50–51); La Paz, Bolivia
- Education: National Academy of Fine Arts "Hernando Siles"
- Occupations: Artist, illustrator, and 3D modeler
- Notable work: American Visa (comic adaptation), Periférica Boulevard (graphic novel adaptation)
- Awards: Grand Prize at the First "6 de Marzo" Salon of Plastic Arts (Bolivia, 2001); Geraldao Award (Brazil, 2011); Career Recognition at Viñetas Rotas International Graphic Narrative Festival (2025)
- Website: Personal Blog Gallery on DeviantArt

Susana Villegas Arroyo (born 1975 in La Paz, Bolivia) is a Bolivian artist, illustrator, and 3D modeler. She is considered one of the most prominent contemporary illustrators in Bolivia and was recognized as one of the nine "golden authors" of Bolivian comics during the 2017 Viñetas con Altura exhibition.

== Biography ==
Susana Villegas Arroyo was born in La Paz, Bolivia, in 1975. She studied at the "6 de Junio" School in her hometown. Between 1995 and 1999, she pursued higher education in arts at the National Academy of Fine Arts "Hernando Siles", graduating with a specialization in painting.

== Career ==
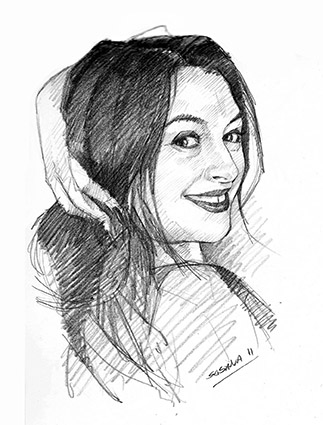
Susana Villegas,self portrait graphite

Villegas began her professional career as an illustrator for the newspapers Presencia and Última Hora between 2000 and 2001. She served as editor for the Bolivian comic supplement Bang! and collaborated with the magazine Crash!! from 2002 to 2006.

In 2003, she participated as an invited artist at the First International Comics Festival held in La Paz.

A significant milestone in her career was the comic adaptation of American Visa in 2005, created in collaboration with David Criado. The adaptation was based on the film directed by Juan Carlos Valdivia Galdo, which itself was adapted from the novel by Juan de Recacoechea.

Villegas expanded into collective projects, contributing to the book La Fiesta Pagana (2008) and participating in the production of the animated short Abuela Grillo (2009).

In 2025, her career achievements were honored with a special recognition at the International Graphic Narrative Festival "Viñetas Rotas", acknowledging her pioneering contributions to Bolivian comics and illustration.

== Works ==
- Of Humans and Other Animals (2000s)
- American Visa (comic adaptation, 2005)
- Periférica Boulevard (graphic novel adaptation, 2013)

== Awards and recognition ==
- Grand Prize at the First "6 de Marzo" Salon of Plastic Arts (Bolivia, 2001)
- Geraldao Award (Brazil, 2011)
- Recognized as one of the nine "golden authors" of Bolivian comics at Viñetas con Altura exhibition (2017)
- Career recognition for her contributions to graphic narrative and mentoring new generations at the International Graphic Narrative Festival "Viñetas Rotas" (2025)
