= Periférica Blvd. =

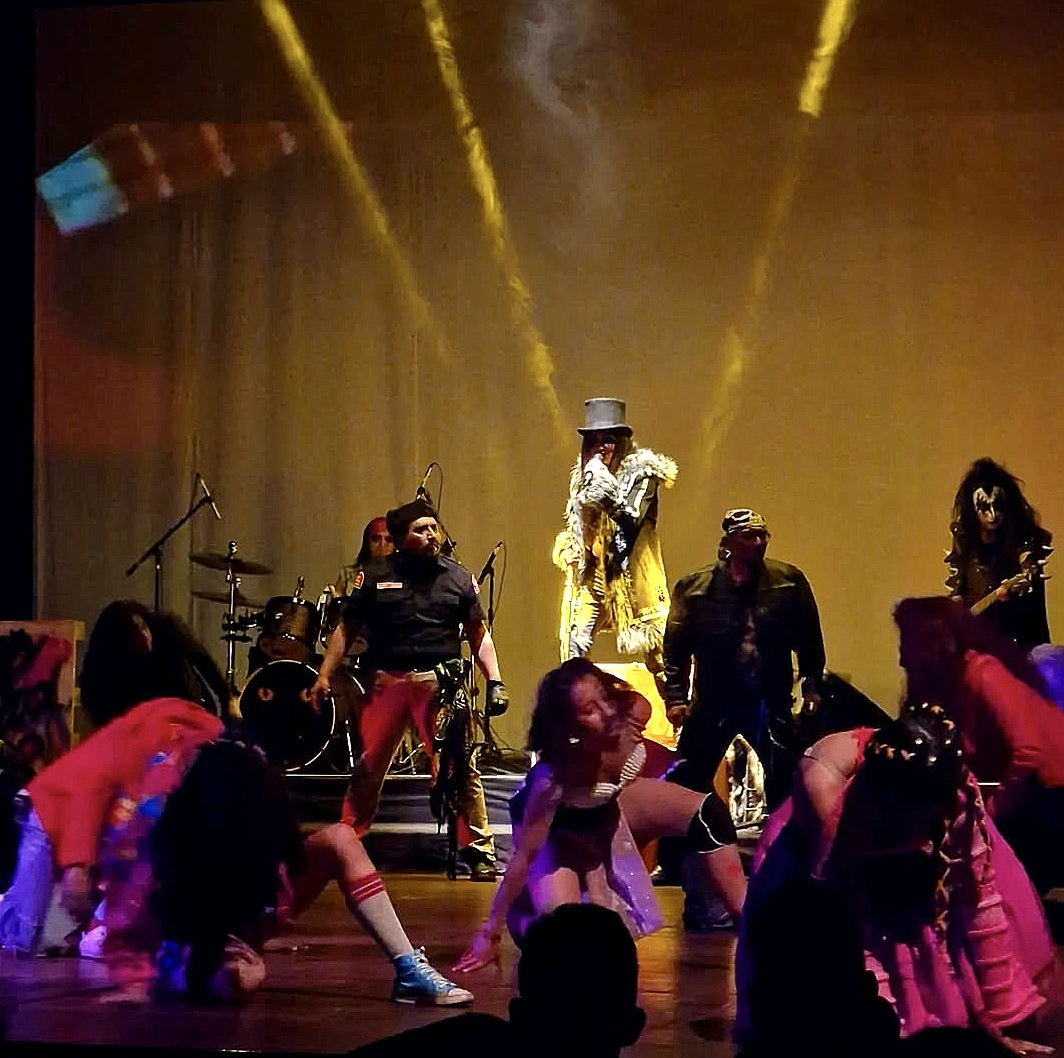
- Stage adaptation of Periférica Blvd. performed by Patas Arriba theatre

Periférica Blvd. Crónicas de una ciudad de locos is a neo-police novel by Bolivian author Adolfo Cárdenas Franco, first published in 2004. It is widely considered one of the most significant works of contemporary Bolivian literature.

The novel originated from the short story Periférica Blvd., which was part of Cárdenas's 1992 book Fastos Marginales. The narrative is notable for its experimental use of language, blending high-register Spanish with the "coa" (criminal slang), indigenous Aymara influences, and urban dialects of La Paz.

== Background ==
The Bolivian National Novel Award was established in 1998 by the Ministry of Education, Culture and Sports, the Vice Ministry of Culture, BBVA Previsión AFP S.A., and Santillana Ediciones S.A., with the aim of promoting Bolivian literature in Spanish and supporting Bolivian authors.

In 2003, during the sixth edition of the award, Periférica Blvd. received an Honorable Mention. The main prize was awarded to La gula del picaflor by Juan Claudio Lechín. Although it did not win, the novel achieved notable success and went through multiple sold-out editions.

== Plot ==
Periférica Blvd. centers on the murder of El Rey, a graffiti artist from the underground scene of La Paz. The main suspect is his rival, El Lobo, a figure whom no one has seen except for Maik, the only eyewitness.

Because a police officer is implicated in the crime, Maik goes into hiding. Lieutenant Villalobos and Corporal Severo Fernández pursue him through the city during a single night.

The narrative unfolds across a variety of marginal and urban settings, including nightclubs, informal social spaces, and encounters with figures such as a yatiri (Andean spiritual practitioner).

== Author ==
Adolfo Cárdenas Franco is known for his focus on marginal and popular urban culture in relation to the city of La Paz. His work is often associated with other Bolivian writers such as René Bascopé, Jaime Saenz, Arturo Borda, Víctor Hugo Viscarra and Juan Pablo Piñeiro.

== Critical reception ==
Critics have highlighted the novel's use of popular language, orality, and multiple narrative voices, as well as its incorporation of elements associated with noir fiction, parody, and intertextuality.

Scholarly work has also addressed its stylistic complexity and its relationship with Bolivian urban culture. Studies have emphasized its demanding linguistic style, as well as its hybrid narrative structure and its connections with visual and performative elements.

Daniela Renjel describes the novel as operating “at the limits of the detective genre, permeated by parody, comics, and deep intertextuality with cultural references”.

Other critics have situated the novel within broader developments in Bolivian literature.

== Publication ==
The novel was first published in August 2004 by the Bolivian publishing house Gente Común, in collaboration with the Universidad Mayor de San Andrés, and was presented at the La Paz International Book Fair.

The initial print run sold out, followed by subsequent reprints. In 2013, after the dissolution of Gente Común, the work was reissued by Editorial 3600, which also released a lower-cost edition aimed at wider circulation.

== Chilean edition ==
In 2012, the Chilean publisher Espora Ediciones released an edition of the novel as part of its contemporary Latin American narrative collection. This edition included a prologue by Ana Rebeca Prada.

Changes in this edition included a different cover image and the use of the full word “Boulevard” instead of the abbreviation “Blvd.”.

== Adaptations ==
The novel has been adapted into several formats, particularly in theatre.

One of its chapters, “Ch’ojcho con audio de rock pesado”, was adapted by Bolivian director David Mondacca as part of the play Marka pa’ tres, premiered in 2002 in La Paz.

In 2011, a musical adaptation based on the work was staged at the Teatro Municipal Alberto Saavedra Pérez by the theatre company Patas Arriba.

Another adaptation, La Policía también llora, was staged in 2018.

== Graphic novel ==
A graphic novel adaptation of Periférica Blvd. was published in 2013 by Editorial 3600. The project involved artists Álvaro Ruilova, Susana Villegas, and Óscar Zalles, and has been described as the first Bolivian graphic novel.

== Characters ==
- Severo Fernández: An aging police lieutenant and one of the story's narrators. He represents the "traditional" police force, often struggling to navigate the chaotic and linguistically complex underworld of La Paz.
- Cabo Flores: Fernández's subordinate, whose perspective provides a more direct link to the street level of the city and its marginal characters.
- El Rey: A legendary graffiti artist whose murder sets the plot in motion. He symbolizes the underground youth culture that the authorities fail to understand.
- El Lobo: The mysterious antagonist and rival of El Rey, representing the darker, more violent side of the urban periphery.
- Maik: A witness to the crime whose speech is heavily influenced by Americanized pop culture and local slang, embodying the cultural hybridization of the Bolivian youth.

== Reception and legacy ==
Periférica Blvd. is widely regarded as a "cult novel" and a pivotal work in contemporary Bolivian literature. Rather than a traditional detective story, critics have described it as a parodic and "neo-police" narrative that uses the investigation of a crime as a pretext to explore the linguistic and social fragmentation of La Paz.

The novel's most celebrated feature is its experimental use of language, which integrates the "coa" (criminal slang), Aymara loanwords, and urban dialects. This stylistic complexity has led academics to classify it within the "Andean Baroque" or "dirty realism" traditions, rather than conventional genre fiction. While some contemporary reviewers have noted its "low life" atmosphere, the work is primarily recognized for its satirical take on the cultural clashes between the city's marginalized peripheries and its traditional urban centers.

The work has been adapted into a comic book (serialized in the newspaper Pulso and later published as a book) and a theatrical play by the "Paso de Gato" troupe.
