= American Visa =

- Mexican film poster
- Directed by: Juan Carlos Valdivia
- Written by: Juan Carlos Valdivia
- Starring: Demián Bichir; Kate del Castillo
- Release date: 2005
- Countries: Bolivia; Mexico
- Language: Spanish

American Visa is a 2005 Bolivia/Mexico-produced film written and directed by Juan Carlos Valdivia and based on Juan de Recacoechea's novel. The film is set in La Paz, Bolivia, and features many exterior shots of the city and surrounding countryside.

Mario is a retired English teacher from the Bolivian countryside. Leaving his career, his home, his town and his past, he sets out to follow his dream of seeing the United States. Mario hopes to become a part of the American dream; America to him is opportunity, stability, and a place to escape from his old life and reunite with his now adult son.

Mario arrives in La Paz in order to secure a travel visa for the US. Once there, he meets and befriends Blanca, an exotic dancer at the local strip club. But Mario is a diligent man, and he is willing to revert to any measure possible to obtain that one thing which he wants most: a life in the United States.

== Plot ==
Mario arrives in La Paz. As the bus moves through the countryside, we see flashbacks of Mario's memories of his wife, and of his son, who lives in Miami. Mario tries to get a Visa of the United States in order to go there and visit his son, and eventually stay and live in that country. At first the process seems to go well. Mario gives his papers to the US embassy, where he is told that everything is in order and that he can return in a week to obtain his Visa. Thinking the Visa is secured, he buys a ticket to Miami. Then, returning to the hotel where he is staying, he meets Blanca, an exotic dancer, who lives there as well. He tells her that he is going to the US to live with his son, but she tries to convince him to stay in Bolivia because she does not believe in the "American Dream." Nevertheless, despite their vastly different dreams, the two share an immediate attraction, and they quickly fall into a promising relationship.

After a week he returns to the embassy, and discovers his visa has been denied. An official tells him that he should say that he would not try to stay in the United States, which is something he can not do. Naturally Mario is angered, and he is forcibly removed from the office. Outside the embassy, a woman gives him the business card of a company that might help him with the visa. Visiting their office, he discovers that the company will charge him $5,000 for providing a visa. This is, of course, an amount that he does not have.

He continues his relationship with Blanca while thinking about the possibilities for getting the money. When he sells some gold to a woman in a shop, he thinks of a plan. For days he watches the store and follows the courier after the shop closes. He finds out that the owner of the shop has several businesses of the same type. After a time, he decides to rob the owner in order to get the money he needs. Meanwhile, Blanca has fallen in love with him. Eventually Don Mario breaks into the owner's home to rob him, but during the theft, Mario is discovered and in the ensuing fight with the owner, Mario strikes him, knocking him to the floor. At this, Mario thinks he has killed him, and returns to the hotel, lamenting what he has done.

The next day, Mario contacts the document broker and buys the visa. He discovers that the US embassy official, a corrupt man without scruples, is the source of the visa. After receiving the visa, he plans his visit to his son, but the man whom he assaulted has other plans, sending two of his workers to abduct him and take him into the countryside to interrogate him. When they realize that Mario no longer has the money, they give him a beating and throw him off a cliff.

Luck is with Mario, however. He is not killed, but is taken to a hospital, where he is reunited with Blanca. After recovering, he postpones his plans to travel to Miami and goes with Blanca to visit her village.
