= Juan de Recacoechea =

Bolivian novelist and journalist (1935–2017)

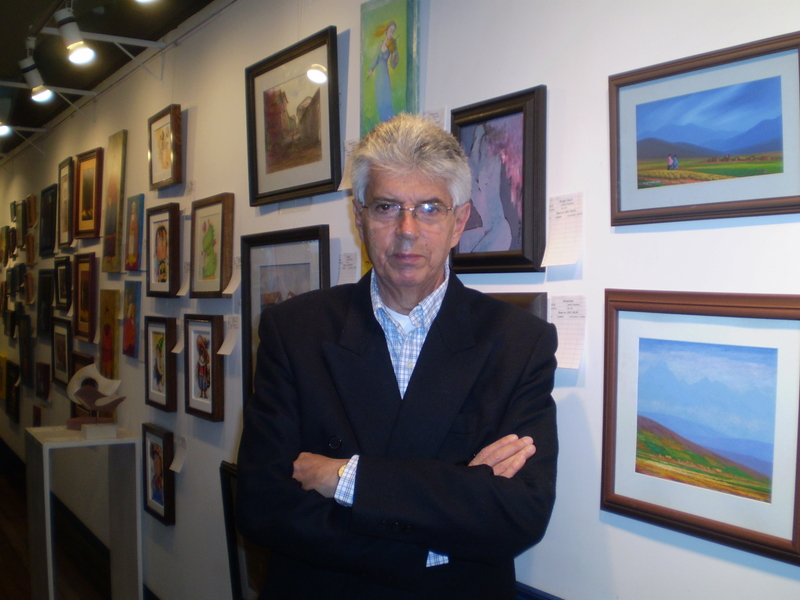
- Born: 1935; La Paz, Bolivia
- Died: 2017 (aged 81–82)
- Occupation(s): Novelist, journalist
- Notable work: American Visa, Altiplano Express

Juan de Recacoechea (1935–2017) was a Bolivian novelist and journalist. He was born in La Paz. He worked as a journalist for many years in both Europe and in his native country. He later turned to writing fiction, and published a series of successful novels, most notably American Visa, a bestseller that was made into a movie. Two of his novels were translated into English: American Visa and Altiplano Express.
