= Juan Carlos Valdivia Galdo =

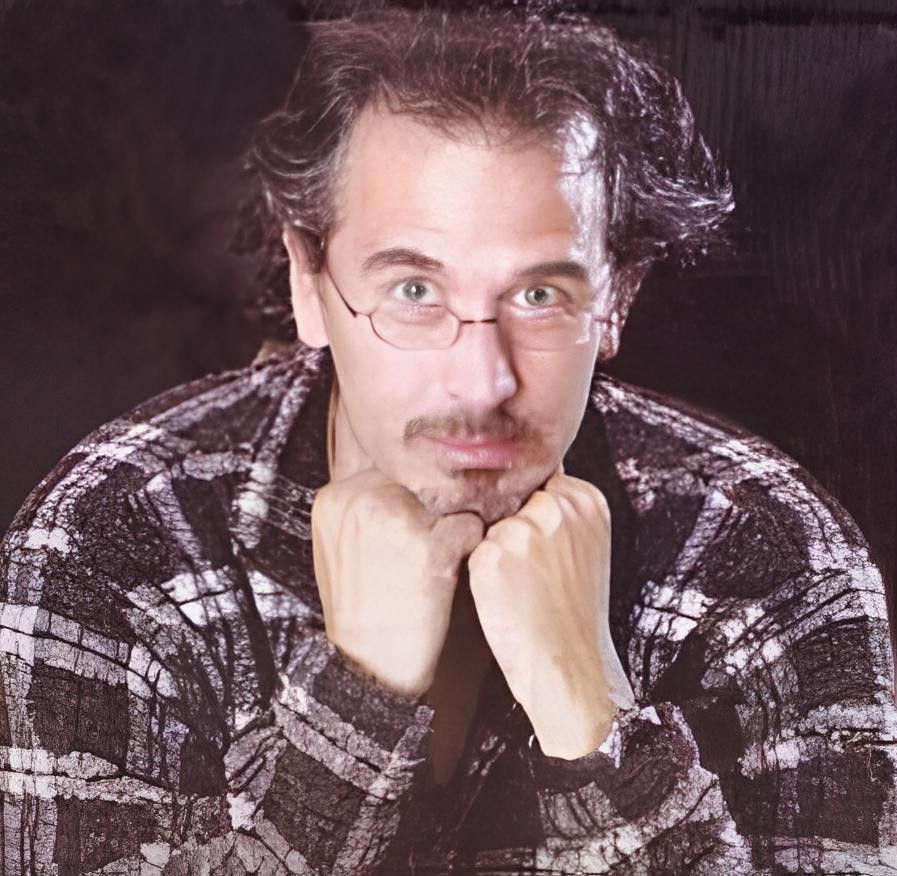
- Juan Carlos Valdivia Galdo in 2006
- Born: February 13, 1962 (age 63); La Paz, Bolivia Bolivia
- Website: https://nomadacine.com/

Juan Carlos Valdivia (born February 13, 1962, La Paz, Bolivia) is a Bolivian-Mexican director, producer, screenwriter, and actor. He is recognized for his contributions to Latin American cinema, having directed and produced numerous films and television programs throughout his career.

== Biography ==
Juan Carlos Valdivia was born in La Paz, Bolivia. At the age of eighteen, he moved to the United States to study architecture at the Illinois Institute of Technology, but did not complete his degree. He later took painting classes and studied film at Columbia College in Chicago, graduating in 1987. During his studies, Valdivia directed and edited three 16mm short films with his own scripts: Swamp (1985), Transients (1987), and Drowning (1989). These works were financed by private entrepreneurs and grants from the Illinois Arts Council and the National Endowment for the Arts. Swamp won the Best Director award at a local festival, Transients participated in the Berlin Festival, and Drowning was broadcast on television in Canada, Japan, and Europe.

== Film career ==
After working in Hollywood and facing a lack of opportunities for Latinos, Valdivia moved to Mexico in 1994. There, he began to alternate his work in cinema with directing commercials, music videos (including Ángel de amor by the band Maná), and episodes for television series.

=== Jonás y la ballena rosada ===
His debut film, Jonás y la ballena rosada (1995), was a Bolivian-Mexican co-production based on the novel of the same name by José Wolfango Montes Vanucci. Set in Bolivia during the 1980s, the film broke paradigms of Bolivian cinema at the time and received several international awards, including the India Catalina for Best Debut Film at the Cartagena International Film Festival.

=== American Visa ===
In 2005, Valdivia directed American Visa, based on the novel by Juan de Recacoechea. The film, starring Demián Bichir and Kate del Castillo, tells the story of a rural teacher trying to obtain a visa to the United States. American Visa won the Ariel Award for Best Adapted Screenplay and was nominated for the Goya Award for Best Spanish Language Foreign Film.

=== Zona Sur ===
In 2009, Valdivia wrote and directed Zona Sur, a film that explores the life of an upper-class family in La Paz during Evo Morales's rise to power. The film received numerous awards, including Best Director and Best Screenplay at the Sundance Film Festival, and is considered one of the most important films in Bolivian cinema history.

=== Yvy Maraey ===
In 2012, Valdivia released Yvy Maraey, a film that follows the journey of a filmmaker and a Guarani leader through Bolivia. The film premiered at the Berlinale and MOMA, and won awards at the Canada International Film Festival.

== Awards and recognition ==
Throughout his career, Valdivia has received several awards and recognitions. In 2011, the Municipal Council of La Paz awarded him the Prócer Pedro Domingo Murillo Medal with Palmas de Oro for his cinematographic career.

== Filmography ==
- Swamp (1985) - Short film
- Transients (1987) - Short film
- Drowning (1989) - Short film
- Jonás y la ballena rosada (1995) - Feature film
- Cuentos para solitarios (1999) - TV series
- La vida en el espejo (1999) - TV series
- Feliz Navidad, mamá (2002) - TV series
- American Visa (2005) - Feature film
- El Laberinto (2007) - TV program
- Zona Sur (2009) - Feature film
- Yvy Maraey (2012) - Feature film
- Eternamente héroes (2013) - Short film
- Short Plays (Bolivia segment) (2014) - Short film
- Mi Mar Adentro (2014) - Short film
- Soren (2018) - Feature film
