= Luzmila Carpio =

Bolivian singer (born 1949)

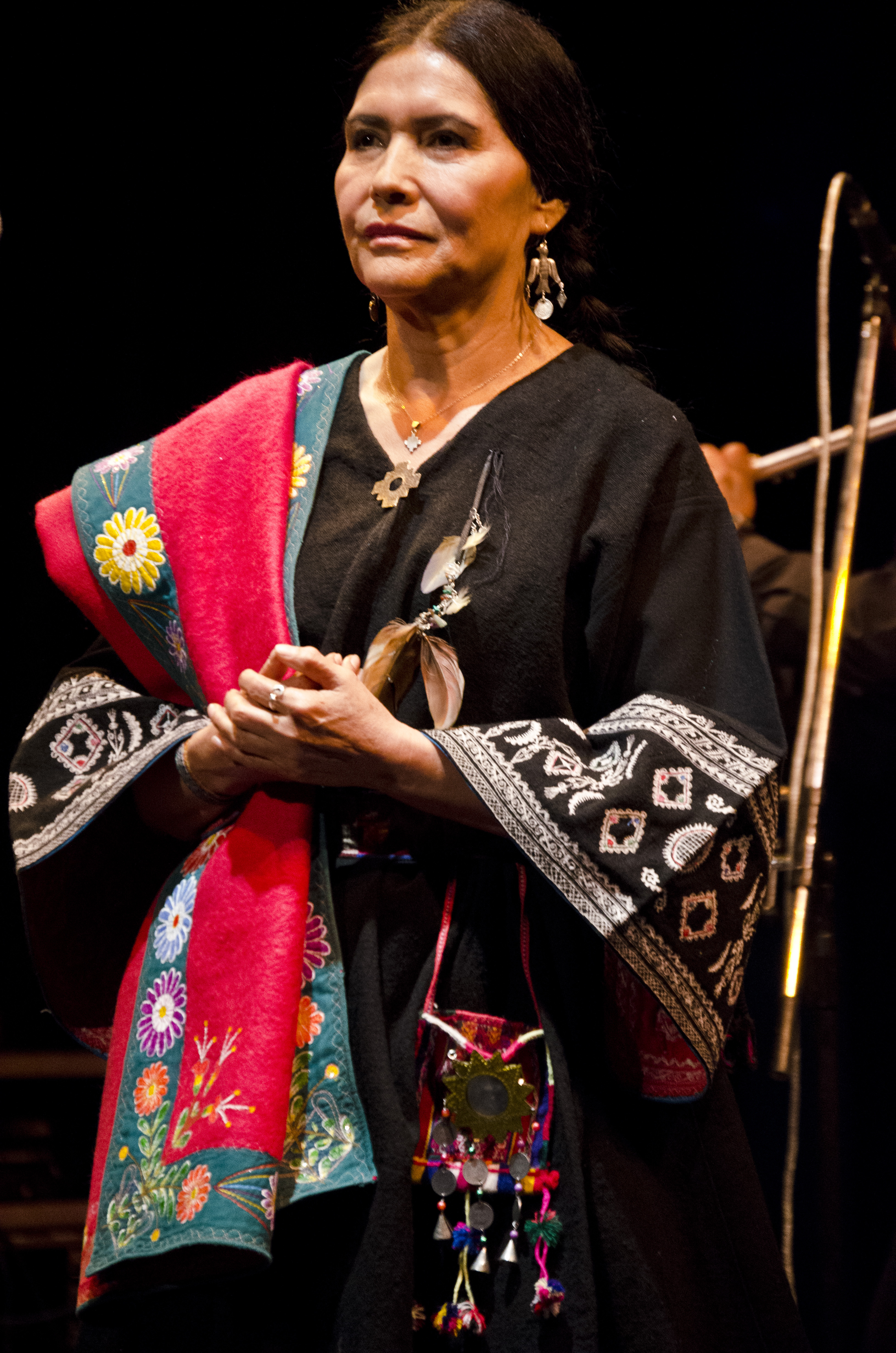
- Born: 1949 (age 76–77)

Luzmila Carpio (born 1949) is a Bolivian singer and songwriter who has performed in Spanish and Quechua. She served as the Bolivian ambassador to France from 2006 to 2010.

== Early life ==
Luzmila Carpio was born in 1949, in Qala Qala, a community near Ayllu Panacachi, in the northern region of Department of Potosi.

As a child, she learned the daily songs of the Quechua and Aymara indigenous peoples that inhabit the Bolivian Altiplano. At age 11, she travelled to Oruro to sing for a radio show that gave children the chance to take up the microphone every Sunday, but when she started to sing, the pianist shouted at her, saying "¡Esto lo cantan los indios! ¡Vuelve cuando sepas cantar en castellano!" [That’s what Indians sing! Come back when you know how to sing in Spanish!"]. Carpio fled the studio in tears, but decided that she would return the following Sunday.

For several years in her early teens, she sang in Spanish with a local group at the Technical University of Oruro, but the pull of her native tradition was strong and by age 15, she joined a professional group called Los Provincianos who sang in both Spanish and Quechua.

== Career ==
In her early teens she moved to Oruro, and started expressing herself through her songs. Once she went to a radio station and sang the national anthem of Bolivia, the only song in Spanish that she knew. Later on she was selected as the lead singer by a musical band that participated in a contest in Cochabamba. The popular songs she sang in this occasion were designed to meet the demands of the vast popular segments of the population, mostly descendants of indigenous peoples but who already lived in the cities and spoke Spanish. Afterwards, "Siway Azucena", a melody composed by her inspired by the music of Northern Potosí, spread throughout the country, the first truly indigenous song to have widespread popular success.

Contrary to the prevalent trend of modernisation, she started looking deeper into the cultural and musical ways of the Andes and singing in Quechua, rather than Spanish. The main ingredient was not to please the audiences that kept growing but rather to use her music as an expression of rebellion against the predominance of western cultural ways over indigenous ones, as a way to show that this so far subordinated world also had a contribution to make, and as a way to build more harmonious relationships among the peoples of the world. In this quest, she authored and coauthored a number of songs for children: "Ima sarata munanki" ("What kind of corn do you want"), "Aylluman kutiripuna" ("Let us return to the community") and many others. These songs became popular with children in rural schools.

In the late 1980s, she travelled to Paris to continue her musical evolution and be taken seriously as an artist. According to Sergio Cáceres, former Bolivian ambassador to UNESCO, "Luzmilla suffered a double discrimination in Bolivia by being at the same time indigenous and a woman in a very racist and male dominated society. She created something more profound than urban folklore. Her music is a symbol for oppressed cultures."

On 21 April 2006, President Evo Morales appointed Luzmila Carpio as Bolivia's ambassador to France. This position lasted four years, until 31 March 2010.

Yuyay Jap’ina Tapes was named one of Rolling Stone’s 10 best Latin albums of 2015 and referred to Carpio as being "possibly the most prolific indigenous artist in South America".

In 2015, ZZK Records remixed her music to create the album Luzmila Carpio meets ZZK that received critical acclaim and was described as "futuristic shamanism" by Vice and as "a condensation of tradition and futurism, of past and contemporary, of organic sounds and digital rhythms" by RFI.

== Works ==
She has released more than 25 albums and composed more than 120 songs. Her albums include:

- Chants des Indiens Quechua de Bolivie (Francia, 1983)
- Indianische Stimme (1988); Huayños (1989)
- Vida para los niños (1991)
- Warmikunapax (1993)
- Yayay Jap'ina (1994)
- Oratorio Andino Amazonico
- The Messenger Kuntur Mallku (2003)
- Arawi: The Spirit of the Andes (2004)
- Song of the Earth and Stars (2004)
- Luzmila Carpio Live. En concierto (2005)
- Yayay Jap'ina Tapes (2014)
- Inti Watana (El Retorno del Sol) (2023)

== Honours ==
Luzmila Carpio has been awarded Grand Officer of the Order of Merit of the French Republic (Grande Officier de l'Ordre National du Mérite), on June 14, 2011.
