= The Animation Workshop =

Animation school in Viborg, Denmark

Coordinates: 56°27′22″N 9°24′22″E

Animation Workshop
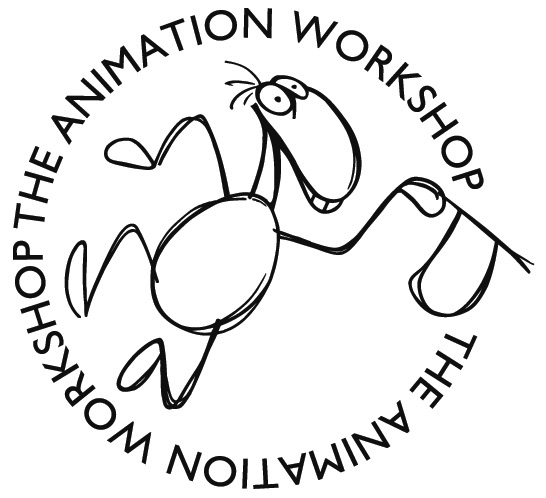
- Established: 1988
- Affiliations: Via University College
- President: Kasper Kruse
- Undergraduates: approx 230
- Location: Viborg, Jutland, Denmark
- Campus: Former military barracks
- Website: animationworkshop.via.dk

The Animation Workshop is an animation school housed in the former military barracks in Viborg, Denmark. It is a part of VIA University College's School of Business, Technology and Creative Industries. Since the late 1980s, The Animation Workshop has educated and trained animators for the Danish as well as the international animation, computer game and visual effects industry. The Animation Workshop has a strong international network of artists, professionals, companies, funding institutions and partner schools. Teachers and students come from Denmark and the rest of the world, and all classes are conducted in English.

TAW has played a role in many international projects, which seek to improve and create an understanding of the role functional animation and applied comics can play in public discourse, learning and modern communication processes.

TAW ranked 3rd best International Animation Schools by the Animation Career Review in 2024. In 2016, the institution was featured among The Top 20 Schools to Hire From as selected by Animation Magazine and won 5th place worldwide in the CG Student Awards in 2015.

== Courses and departments ==
The Animation Workshop consists of seven distinct departments:

- Bachelor Educations – Bachelor or Arts degrees in Character Animation, CG Arts and Graphic Storytelling
- Open Workshop – Talent development and artist residency
- Professional Training Courses – Short courses and master classes for animation professionals
- Drawing Academy – Traditional drawing courses
- Animated Learning Lab – Research and development in the area of children and youth animation
- Arsenalet – A creative stronghold for animation, games and new media companies
- Functional Animation- Applied comics and visualization

== Bachelor of Arts ==
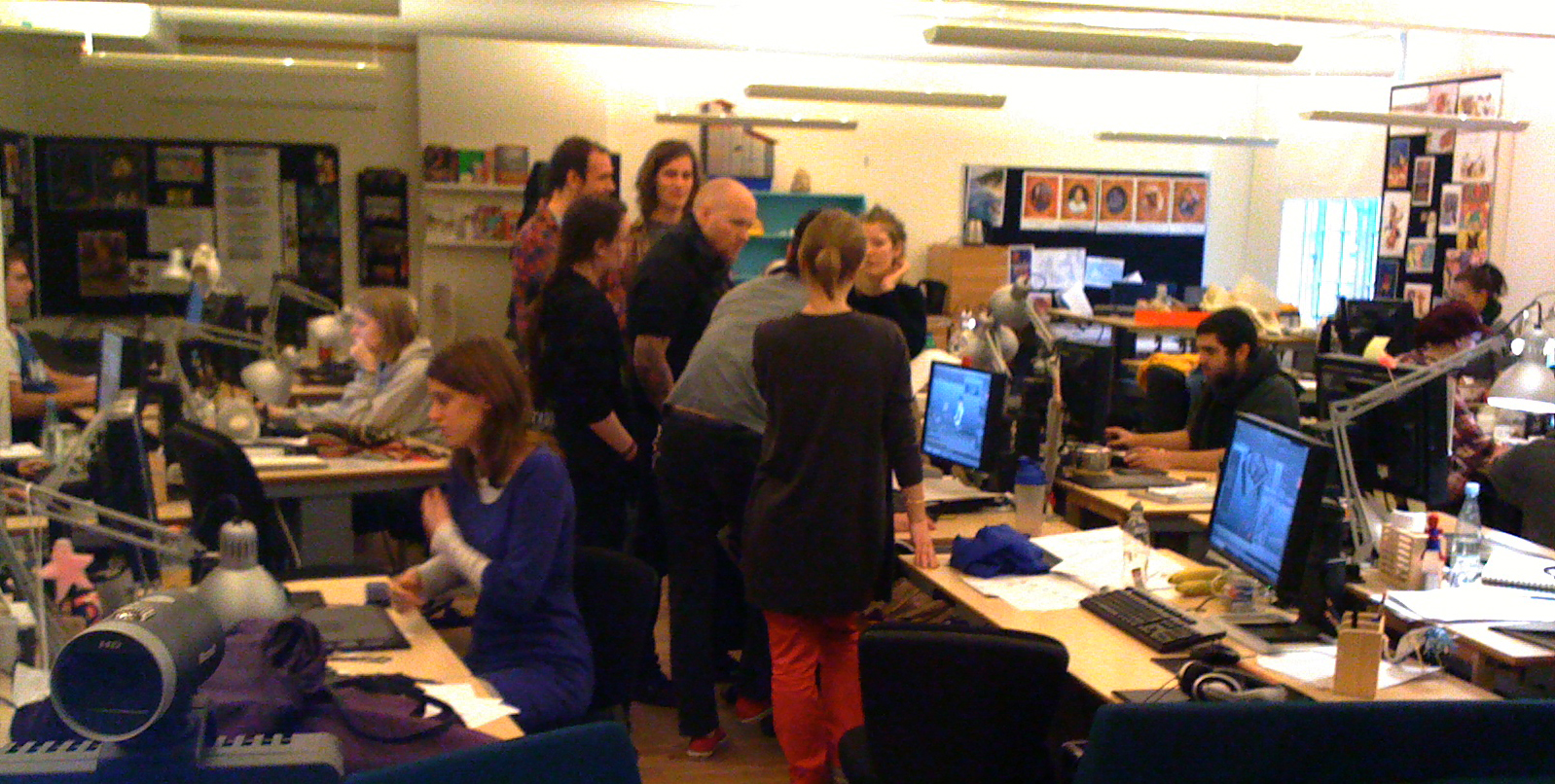
A character animation class at the Animation Workshop

The Bachelor of Art department is the largest department at The Animation Workshop offering three programs in Computer Graphics Art, Character Animation and Graphic Storytelling. The Computer Graphic artists explore the work methods of a computer graphics production from start to finish: from the concept design and storyboarding, through all aspects of the 3D Maya pipeline, to compositing. Character Animators focus on the classical principles of animation through the study of physicality and acting within hand drawn 2D animation, flash and 3D animation in Maya. Graphic Storytelling teaches students all areas of working with graphic storytelling: drawing, sequential storytelling, layout, scripting, storyboarding for films, cross media and developing original graphic universes.

TAW professional network includes teachers from prominent production, companies such as PIXAR, Disney, DreamWorks, Aardman, Lucasfilm, Framestore, EA Games, Double Fine Games, Tell Tale Games and Cinesite.

During the programmes, the students work not only on assignments but also in larger production teams on films and games, both within the school and in cooperation with a number of partner institutions. These institutions include The National Danish Film School, DADIU, The Danish Design School, Aalborg University, Aarhus University, The University of Copenhagen, IT University, The Technical University of Denmark, La Poudrière (FR), Gobelins (FR), Filmakademie Baden-Württemberg (DE) and MOME (HU).

== Open Workshop ==
Projects supported and hosted by the Open Workshop include:

- Portfolio creation and animation tests
- Short films and music videos
- Documentary animation
- Graphic novels, including online/interactive
- Art books
- Cross- media properties
- Internet films and games
- Installations and exhibitions
- Cross- artistic projects/shows/theatre plays/concerts
- The development of feature films, TV shows, games, and cross-media projects

== Professional Training course ==
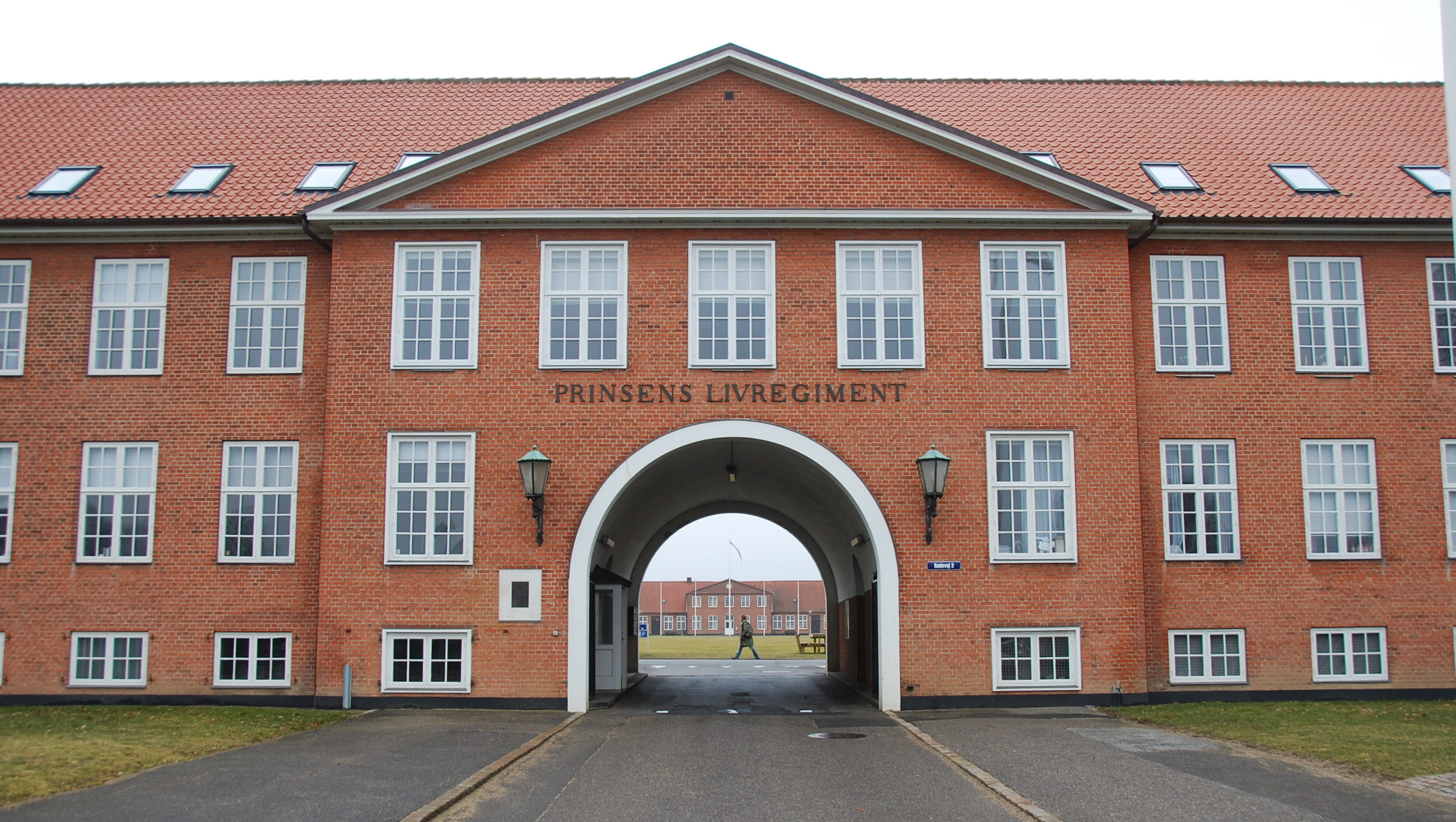
Gateway to the Animation Workshop

Supported by Creative Europeś's Media sub-programme, the Professional Training department organizes short training courses and master classes designed for European animation professionals. The Professional Training department relies on an international network of animation and film professionals. Courses and master classes are created for young to experienced professionals with animation experience on any medium. The target groups range from storyboard and concept artists, character designers and art directors, to animators, CG artists and directors.

The Professional Training department offers the following courses:

- 3D Character Animation: a 15-week training course which takes the participants through all the components of 3D character animation
- VFX: over 16 weeks, this course is designed to train industry-ready VFX generalists
- Drawing and Visualization: an 18-week semester course in classical drawing, comics, illustration and visual facilitation
- AniDox: Lab is a project development workshop offering talented documentary and animation filmmakers the opportunity to engage and combine their two worlds
- Animation Sans Frontieres (ASF) is a 4x2 weeks training programme designed to give junior European animation film and production professionals an understanding of the European and international animation industry and markets, as well the space, time and tool to develop, finance and produce their own projects, careers and eventually production companies

== Drawing Academy ==
Since 1997, The Drawing Academy (TDA) has been offering drawing courses. The primary activity at TDA is a semester course in classical drawing, which provides students with a foundation for a creative career within art, design, advertising, architecture, animation and other related fields. The course is offered twice a year, in January and August.

The course offers training in classical drawing in the context of commercial realities. The teaching is based on the drawing level of each individual student, providing them with challenges that enable them to evolve at their own pace. Students attending this course will learn the basic principles within the subjects of croquis drawing, figure drawing and sketching. TDA also organizes shorter courses in classical drawing, as well weekend and summer courses.

In collaboration with Viborg Gymnasium & HF (Higher Preparatory Examination Course), The Drawing Academy offers a 3-year upper secondary education called Visual HF. During this 3-year programme, students follow a regular HF curriculum combined with visual learning and communication. The programme leads to a General Certificate of Secondary Education.

== Animated Learning Lab ==
Over the past 20 years, the Animated Learning Lab (ALL) has worked with animation as a learning tool. The objective of the department is to promote and facilitate the use of animation as a didactic instrument. A fundamental principle in the centre's work is to engage children and have them be active decision makes in creative animation productions. This stimulates learning, enhances creativity and expands viable means of expression. Projects cover a wide range of pedagogic and didactic activities, from efforts to help children with dyslexia learn to read by way of animation to computer interaction and games. All these activities are aimed at teachers in order to promote digital learning strategies and their deployment in Europe.

ALL organizes teacher-training courses, workshops, seminars and conferences that focus on animation as an innovative learning and teaching tool. ALL activities are intended to provide teachers with new innovative tools and methods. As such, ALL has developed a series of educational resources for subjects like math, geography, biology and other fields of study.

In order to assemble and motivate students and teachers who use animation in teaching, ALL has since 2006 held an annual film festival called ANIMOK. During the festival, children get the chance to show their animated films to a larger audience and participate in the festival competition. Moreover, ALL organizes the annual conference ANIMATED LEARNING on creativity and visual teaching methods as well as number of different presentations on various cultural and educational events.

The Animated Learning Lab has close cooperation with various national and international cultural and educational institutions: schools, universities, and private and public companies. ALL has implemented a number of projects to promote animation as a didactic tool both in Denmark and abroad with great success on both fronts.

== Arsenalet ==
Arsenalet is a business cluster with specialized skills within the area of animation, games and new media. It offers business assistance for start-ups, along with networking possibilities for international co-production companies within animation and new media business areas. Arsenalet houses entrepreneurs and well-established companies. When Arsenalet was founded in 2012, only 7 companies lived under its roof; now that number is 35, including SYBO Games, Nørlum, Monkey Tennis, Tumblehead, Visikon and SØNC.

The companies at Arsenalet are specialized in:

- Feature, TV and short film
- 2D animation
- 3D animation
- Compositing
- CG Arts
- Technical direction
- Marketing and promotion
- Game production
- Concept art
- Writing
- Storyboarding
- Pre-production
- VFX
- Business development
- Graphic storytelling

Arsenalet offers a number of specialized services for residents of the cluster:

- Game Incubation: the incubation is an opportunity for individuals or teams to establish a company in the game industry. Assistance includes networking possibilities, workshops and access to game industry and conferences.
- Mentors: new businesses in Arsenalet are partnered with mentors from established companies that offer guidance for business development.
- Matchmaking: entrepreneurs are matched with relevant companies inside and outside the animation and new media industry, as well as educational environments and potential clients.
- Funding: Arsenalet offers supervision on fundraising applications as well as business investments.

== Functional animation ==
The Animation Workshop acts as a national innovation network designed to encourage development and integration of animation, visualization and applied comics into new areas such as science, learning, communication, health care/patient empowerment, news production and interactive media. The basic idea and vision behind the network is that the communicative potential of animation, visualization and graphic storytelling should be examined. The main target groups for the network's activities are, aside from the Danish animation industry, private companies and public institutions that seek to challenge the use of visual language.

TAW conducts experiments, knowledge sharing and matchmaking events. These activities are carried out by teams of professional partners from within the visual media industry, working in close cooperation with institutions in the network. The new insights obtained by the partners in the network are made available through various platforms, such as meetings, seminars, conferences, consultations and public events.

== Short films and productions ==
As part of the student's curriculum and finishing exams, their studies move towards one large, collaborative project culminating in their bachelor projects. The Animation Workshop supports them through these semesters and supply them the necessary tools and production procedure through students' final year of studies to complete a short film or game production. Recent film projects include:

- About Time (2024)
- Judgement (2024)
- Monkey Movie (2024)
- Beanboy (2023)
- Katabasis (2023)
- Mano (2023)
- Overgrown (2023)
- Postmouse (2023)
- Apex Point (2022)
- Cowboy Kevin (2022)
- Fayburrow (2022)
- La Chambre Du General (2022)
- Lament (2022)
- BusLine35A (2021)
- When The Moon was Gibbous (2021)
- Nomads (2021)
- Pride of Lions (2021)
- Cut it Out (2021)
- Riot5 (2021)
- Monachopsis (2019)
- Desert (2019)
- Deepness of the Fry (2019)
- Ur Aska (2019)
- Forget-me-not (2019)
- Animals (2019)
- Reverie (2018)
- Within Without (2018)
- Bacchus (2018)
- Vermine (2018)
- Dark Dark Woods (2017)
- Less than Human (2017)
- Nachthexen (2017)
- Stellar (2017)
- Whale Heart (2017)
- Tiger (2016)
- Bäckanäcken (2016)
- Between Walls (2016)
- The Shepherd (2016)
- Grandma`s Hero (2016)
- Untamed (2016)
- Vagabond (2015)
- Tsunami (2015)
- The Wanderer (2015)
- Roommate Wanted- Dead or Alive (2015)
- Parrot Away (2015)
- The Great Harlot and the Beast (2015)
- Fibers (2015)
- Borislav (2014)
- Interview (2014)
- Out of Bounds (2014)
- Once Upon a Candle (2014)
- Unimagined Friends (2014)
- Memoria (2013)
- Out of the Ordinary (2013)
- Porcelain (2013)
- The Odd Sound Out (2013)
- Under the Fold (2013)
- The Reward (2013)
- Space Stallions (2012)
- Ride Of Passage(2012)
- Vaesen(2012)
- Wing(2012)
- Slug Invasion(2012)
- Load (2012)
- The Backwater Gospel (2011)
- The Saga of Biorn (2011)
- Captain Awesome (2011)
- Salma (2011)
- Last Fall (2011)
- Flap Crashers (2011)
- Mighty Antlers (2011)
- Out of a Forest (2010)
- Stop Motherfucker (2010)
- The Fox Sisters (2010)
- The Lumberjack (2010)
- Elk Hair Caddis (2010)
- Vegeterrible (2010)
- They Came from Beyond (2010)
- Dinorider (2010)
- Draw Poker (2009)
- Katrine (2009)
- Leitmotif (2009)
- Pig Me (2009)
- Project Alpha (2009)
- Sheep! (2009)
- Trainbombing (2009)
- Office Noise (2008)
- Bertram (2008)
- From Alaska to Kenya (2008)
- Roadkill (2008)
- Girl and Robot (2008)
- Otto and Stella (2008)
- Die Fleder Oma (2007)
- Sweet Dreams (2007)
- Teddy`s Boy (2007)
- Paux De Trols (2007)
- Lost in the Forest (2007)
- Fishing with Spinoza (2007)
- Hum (2007)
- What The Time Is (2007)
- Dharma Dreameater (2007)
