= List of massacres in Bolivia =

The following is a list of notable massacres in Bolivia.

Name	Date	Location	Deaths	Notes
Battle of Kuruyuki	28 January 1892	Cuevo, Cordillera Province, Santa Cruz Department	6,000	
La Paz Massacre	October, 1913	La Paz, La Paz Department	7	2+ Wounded; workplace violence committed by an employee with an axe after being reprimanded by his boss.
Catavi Massacre	21 December 1942	Catavi mine, Bustillos, Potosí Department	19–400	Massacre of striking miners
1946 La Paz riots	8–21 July 1946	La Paz	130	200+ Wounded
Siglo XX mine massacre	28–30 May 1949	Siglo XX mine, Llallagua, Bustillos, Potosí Department	144	23 injurerd
Bolivian National Revolution	9–11 April 1952	La Paz	490	1.000 Wounded
Terebinto Massacre	19 May 1958	Terebinto, Porongo, Santa Cruz Department	4	Massacre of Santa Cruz citizens by Ucureña militias and armed forces.
San Juan Massacre	24 June 1967	Siglo XX–Catavi mine complex, Bustillos, Potosí Department	20	Massacre of miners following the San Juan Festival
Tolata Massacre	22–31 January 1974	Tolata, Cochabamba	80 Up to 200	Killing of workers and peasant groups supporting a blockade.
All Saints' Massacre	November 1979	La Paz	100+	Killings of protesters, largely in urban La Paz, during the 14-day coup by Alberto Natusch Busch
Caracoles massacre	2–4 August 1980	Caracoles Mine, Inquisivi Province, La Paz	11	The exact number is not known although the names of 11 dead, 17 wounded and 14 missing were given. They looted homes, beat children, raped women and girls, and carried off the dead and wounded in three alligators.
Harrington Street massacre	15 January 1981	Sopocachi, La Paz	8	Mass shooting by paramilitaries of leaders of the Movement of the Revolutionary Left party
Huayllani massacre	3 June 1985	Huayllani bridge, Sacaba, Cochabamba	2-4	Security forces killed 2 to 4 blockading protesters.
Parotani Massacre	28 May 1987	Parotani, Cochabamba	8	Security forces killed four or five protesters during protests against coca eradication.
Villa Tunari Massacre	27 June 1988	Villa Tunari, Chapare, Cochabamba Department	8-12	Massacre of protesting coca growers by Rural Mobile Patrol
Christmas Massacre	19–21 December 1996	Amayapampa, Capasirca, and Llallagua, Potosí Department	11	Shootings of striking miners
Laymi–Qaqachaka violence	23–25 January 2000	Challapata, Oruro	25-33	Killings of 25–33 people in a series of inter-ethnic raids among the Laymi, Qaqachaka and Jucumani ayllus.
Panantí masacre	9 November 2001	Panantí, Tarija	7	Hired assailants killed six farmers belonging to the Landless Workers Movement; one assailant was killed.
2003 La Paz riots	12–13 February 2003	La Paz	31	268 injured
October Massacre	October 2003	El Alto and La Paz, Murillo, La Paz Department	67	Killings of protesters during the Bolivian Gas Conflict
Cochabamba social unrest of 2007	January 11 and 12, 2007	Cochabamba Department	3	Violent clashes between supporters and opponents of Cochabamba Prefect Manfred Reyes Villa in the departmental capital city of Cochabamba
La Calancha massacre	November 23 and 25, 2007	Castillo de la Glorieta, Sucre	3	At least three people die in clashes over a new draft constitution in Sucre.
Porvenir Massacre	11 September 2008	El Porvenir, Pando Department	12	Killings of Pando peasants during the Constituent Assembly conflicts.
Raid on the Hotel Las Américas	April 16, 2009	Santa Cruz de la Sierra	3	Three foreign nationals died in the operation, whom the police identified as terrorist mercenaries, while a further two people were arrested. According to the Bolivian police, the group had been planning to assassinate Bolivian President Evo Morales and Vice President Álvaro García Linera
Palmasola prison riot	August 23, 2013	Palmasola, Santa Cruz	31	deadliest prison riot in Bolivian history
Oruro attacks	10–13 February 2018	Oruro, Oruro Department	12	Two bomb attacks
Sacaba massacre	15 November 2019	Huayllani bridge, Sacaba, Cochabamba	10	Killings of pro-Evo Morales protesters by soldiers and police during the 2019 Bolivian political crisis
Senkata massacre	19 November 2019	Senkata neighborhood, El Alto, La Paz Department	11	Killings of pro-Evo Morales protesters by soldiers and police during the 2019 Bolivian political crisis
