= History of Bolivia (1920–1964) =

Bolivia's defeat by Paraguay in the Chaco War (1932–1936) marked a turning point in the modern history of Bolivia. Significant loss of life and territory discredited the traditional ruling classes, while service in the army produced stirrings of political awareness among the indigenous people. Much of the contested Gran Chaco region was surrendered to Paraguay. In return, Bolivia was given access to the Paraguay River where Puerto Busch was founded, and, with this, free access to the Atlantic Ocean through international waters was possible.

In 1936, Standard Oil's Bolivian operations were nationalized, and the state-owned firm Yacimientos Petroliferos Fiscales Bolivianos (YPFB) was created. From the end of the Chaco War until the 1952 Bolivian National Revolution, the emergence of contending ideologies and the demands of new groups convulsed Bolivian politics. Bolivian tin enjoyed high demand and prices during World War II and the Korean War.

Even as the quality of the ores fell, the U.S. built a smelter that could handle low-grade Bolivian ores and continued to buy Bolivian tin. Following the nationalization of the mines, tin prices fell with the Korean War over, and the U.S. no longer needed tin to support a war effort. Additionally, when the mines were nationalized, the foreign mining engineers and managers left the country, leaving the mines lacking skilled replacements.

== Republican Party and Great Depression ==
The Liberal Party's long rule of Bolivia, one of the most stable periods in the country's history, ended when the Republicans seized the presidency in a bloodless coup d'état in 1920. Fernando Díez de Medina, a Bolivian writer, commented on the change: "Twenty years of privilege for one group ends, and ten years of privilege for another begins." Republican Party soon split into two parties: one led by Bautista Saavedra with his Republican Socialist Party and another led by Daniel Salamanca, who established the Genuine Republican Party. Saavedra, President between 1920 and 1925, had the support of the urban middle class, while Salamanca was more conservative. Several minor political parties influenced by socialist or Marxist thought also emerged.

During the Republican rule, the Bolivian economy underwent a profound change. Tin prices started to decline in the 1920s. After peaking in 1929, tin production fell dramatically as the Great Depression nearly destroyed the international tin market. This decline was also caused by the decrease in the tin content of ore and the end of new investment in the mines in Bolivia. As economic growth slowed, Republican presidents relied on foreign loans. Saavedra (1920–25) and Hernando Siles Reyes (1926–30) borrowed heavily in the United States to finance major development projects, despite opposition by Bolivian nationalists to the favorable terms for the lender. The so-called Nicolaus loan aroused national indignation because it gave the United States control over Bolivia's tax collections in return for a private banking loan of US$33 million.

The rule of the Republican Party and its President Saavedra initially did not indicate any profound changes in Bolivian politics. The 1920s, however, was a period of political change. During the 1920s, Bolivia faced growing social turmoil. Saavedra legalized the right to strike and introduced government arbitration in labor disputes. In 1922, he caused a general strike after banning night taxis. The strikers won, taxi services were resumed, and the railroad federation was recognized as representative of railroad workers.

Labor unrest, such as the miners' strike in Uncia in 1923, was brutally suppressed. The unrest reached new heights of violence after the drastic workforce reduction during the Great Depression. Indian peasants continued to rebel in the countryside. However, they had been disarmed, and their leaders had been executed after participating in the overthrow of the Conservative Party in 1899. Now, for the first time, the Indians found support for their cause among the elite. Gustavo Navarro, who took the name Tristan Marof, was Bolivia's most important Indianist. He saw in the Inca past the first successful socialism and the model to solve rural problems. As Indian uprisings continued during the Liberal rule, Siles Reyes promised to improve their situation and organized the National Crusade in Favor of Indians.

The social legislation of the Republican governments was weak, however, because neither Saavedra nor Siles Reyes wanted to challenge the rosca (tin mining magnates' political representatives). Siles Reyes's four years of inconsistent rule and unfulfilled promises of radical changes frustrated workers and students. In 1930, he was overthrown when he tried to bypass the constitutional provision forbidding reelection by resigning to run again. A military junta ruled until March 1931, when Republican leader Daniel Salamanca (1931–34) was elected as a candidate of the Republican and Liberal coalition. Although he was an esteemed economist before taking office, Salamanca was unable to suppress social unrest and to solve the severe economic problems caused by the Great Depression. Criticism of his administration mounted in all sectors of Bolivian society. Initially reluctant to enter into an armed conflict with Paraguay, he nevertheless led Bolivia into the Chaco war, a move supported by the military and traditional groups.

== Chaco War (1932–1935) ==
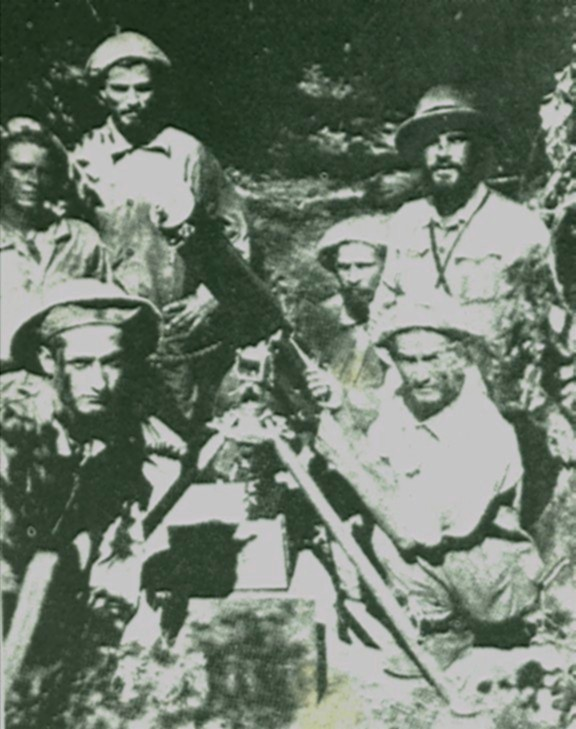
A machine gun manned by Paraguayan soldiers during the Chaco War

The Chaco War originated in a long-standing dispute between Bolivia and Paraguay over the Gran Chaco region. This vast area was largely undeveloped except for some minor oil discoveries by Standard Oil in Bolivia and by Royal Dutch Shell in Paraguay. The Chaco, which Bolivia traditionally regarded as its province, became more significant to Bolivia after it lost its Pacific coastline to Chile in 1879. Bolivia hoped to access the Atlantic Ocean with an oil pipeline across the Chaco to the Paraguay River. Despite mediation attempts by various countries, the increased number of border incidents led the military high commands of Bolivia and Paraguay to prepare for the inevitability of war.

President Salamanca used one of the border incidents to break diplomatic relations with Paraguay and to increase Bolivia's military budget, even though the country had severe economic problems. Convinced that Bolivia's better-equipped, German-trained troops outnumbered the Paraguayan army and could win the war, Salamanca went to war in September 1932.

The war raged for the next three years. The Bolivians experienced defeat in all major battles. By the end of 1934, they had been driven back 482 kilometers from their original positions deep in the Chaco to the foothills of the Andes. Serious strategic errors, poor intelligence, and logistical problems reaching the distant battle lines contributed to the losses. In addition, the morale of the Bolivian troops was low, and the highland Indian troops could not adapt to the extreme climate in the low-lying Chaco. Despite the high command's decision to end the war, Salamanca was determined to continue at all costs. In 1934, when he traveled to the Chaco to take personal command over the war, Salamanca was arrested by the high command and forced to resign. His vice-president, José Luis Tejada Sorzano, who was known to favor peace, was installed as president (1934–36).

Salamanca's overthrow proved a turning point in the Chaco War. New, more capable Bolivian officers stopped the Paraguayan troops, who fought closer to Bolivian supply lines. On June 14, 1935, a commission of neutral nations (Argentina, Brazil, Chile, Colombia, Peru, and the United States) declared an armistice; a definite settlement was finally reached in 1938. Bolivia lost the Chaco but retained the petroleum fields, which Paraguay had failed to reach. Both countries suffered heavy losses in the war. Bolivia lost an estimated 65,000 people killed and 35,000 wounded or captured out of a population of just under 3 million.

The humiliating disaster of the Chaco War had a profound impact on Bolivia, which saw the conflict as a watershed event in the history of the 20th century. The traditional oligarchy was discredited because of its inept civilian and military leadership in the war. Unable to deal with growing criticism, its members blamed the loss of the war on the low potential of the Bolivians and saw the earlier pessimistic assessment in Alcides Arguedas's famous novel Pueblo Enfermo (A Sick People) confirmed.

After the war, middle-class professionals, writers, and young officers questioned the traditional leadership. This group, which came to be known as the Chaco Generation, searched for new ways to deal with the nation's problems. It resented the service of the rosca on behalf of the tin-mining entrepreneurs. It criticized Standard Oil Co., which had delivered oil to Paraguay clandestinely through Argentine intermediaries during the war. The Chaco Generation was convinced of the need for social change. Gustavo Navarro, now more radical than during the 1920s, proclaimed the famous slogan "land to the Indians, mines to the state". The military, which came to power in 1936, tried to bring about change with popular support.

== Prelude to the National Revolution, 1935–1952 ==
=== Radical military government ===
On May 17, 1936, Colonel David Toro Ruilova (1936–37) overthrew President Tejada in a military coup. Because the officer corps wanted to avoid a civilian investigation of the military's wartime leadership, backing for the coup came from all ranks. The main backers were a group of younger officers who wanted to bring profound change to Bolivia. Toro, the leader of this group, hoped to reform the country from the top down. His program of "military socialism" included social and economic justice and government control over natural resources. He also planned to set up a corporate-style political system to replace the democratic system established in 1825.

Toro attempted to get civilian support with far-reaching social legislation and nominated a print worker as the first labor secretary in Bolivia. He also nationalized the holdings of Standard Oil without compensation and called for convening a constitutional congress that would include the traditional parties, new reformist groups, and the labor movement.

Toro was unable to secure lasting popular support. A group of more radical officers resented his reluctance to challenge the rosca, and they supported a coup by Colonel Germán Busch Becerra (1937–39) in 1937. A new constitution was promulgated in 1938, stressing the primacy of the common good over private property and favoring government intervention in social and economic relations. It also legalized the Indian communities and included a labor code. In 1939, Busch challenged the interests of the mine owners for the first time by issuing a decree that would prevent the mining companies from removing capital from the country. None of his policies, however, resulted in significant popular and military support and completely alienated the conservative forces. Frustrated by his inability to bring about change, Busch committed suicide in 1939.

Despite the weakness of the Toro and Busch regimes, their policies had a profound impact on Bolivia. Reformist decrees raised expectations among the middle class, but when they failed to be implemented, they contributed to the growth of the left. The constitutional convention gave the new forces for the first time a nationwide platform and the possibility of forming alliances. The military socialist regimes also prompted the conservatives to join forces to stem the growth of the left.

=== Rise of new political groups ===
After a few months under the provisional presidency of General Carlos Quintanilla (1939–40), the chief of staff during the Busch regime, General Enrique Peñaranda Castillo (1940–43) was elected president in the spring of 1940. Peñaranda's support came from the traditional parties, the Liberals, and the two wings of the Republicans, who had formed a concordancia to stem the growth of the movement toward further reforms.

The trend toward reform, however, could not be halted, and several new groups gained control of the Congress during Peñaranda's presidency. Although very different in ideological outlooks, these groups agreed on the need to change the status quo. They included the Trotskyist Revolutionary Workers Party (Partido Obrero Revolucionario, POR), which had already been formed in 1934, as well as the Bolivian Socialist Falange (Falange Socialista Boliviana, FSB), founded in 1937 and patterned on the Spanish Falange. The Leftist Revolutionary Party (Partido de Izquierda Revolucionaria, PIR) was founded in 1940 by a coalition of radical Marxist groups.

=== Rise of the Nationalist Revolutionary Movement ===
The most important opposition to the concordancia came from the Nationalist Revolutionary Movement (Movimiento Nacionalista Revolucionario, MNR). The first party with widespread support in Bolivian history, the MNR had a membership that included intellectuals and both white-collar and blue-collar workers. It was founded in 1941 by a small group of intellectual dissidents from the middle and upper classes. It represented persons from various political persuasions united by their discontent with the status quo. Among its leaders were Víctor Paz Estenssoro, a professor of economics; Hernán Siles Zuazo, the son of former President Siles Reyes; and several influential writers. The party's program included nationalizing Bolivia's natural resources and far-reaching social reforms.

As the leader of the congressional opposition, the MNR denounced Peñaranda's close cooperation with the United States and was especially critical of his agreement to compensate Standard Oil for its nationalized holdings. The MNR members of Congress also began an investigation of the Catavi Massacre of striking miners and their families by government troops at one of the Patiño mines in Catavi in 1942. MNR's influence with the miners increased when Paz Estenssoro led the congressional interrogation of government ministers. The MNR had contacts with reformist military officers, who were organized in a secret military lodge named the Fatherland's Cause (Razón de Patria, Radepa). Radepa was founded in 1934 by Bolivian prisoners of war in Paraguay. It sought mass support, backed military intervention in politics, and hoped to prevent excessive foreign control over Bolivia's natural resources.

In December 1943, the Radepa-MNR alliance overthrew the Peñaranda regime. Major Gualberto Villarroel López (1943–46) became president, and three MNR members, including Paz Estenssoro, joined his cabinet. The MNR ministers resigned, however, when the United States refused to grant its recognition, repeating its charge of ties between the MNR and Nazi Germany. The ministers returned to their posts in 1944 after the party had won a majority in the election and the United States had recognized the government. Villarroel's government emphasized continuity with the reformist regimes of Toro and Busch. Paz Estenssoro, who served as finance minister, hoped to get popular support with a budget emphasizing social spending over economic development. However, the salary increase for miners did not bring about the consistent backing of the government and only managed to strengthen the ties between the MNR and miners.

The Villarroel government also tried for the first time to get the support of the campesinos. In 1945, the National Indigenous Congress was created to discuss the problems in the countryside and improve the peasants' situation. However, most of the social legislation, such as abolishing the labor obligation of the campesinos to their landlords, was never implemented. Villarroel was overthrown in 1946. He had been unable to organize popular support and faced opposition from conservative groups and increasing political terrorism that included murders of the government's opponents. Rivalry between the MNR and the military in the governing coalition also contributed to his downfall. In 1946, mobs of students, teachers, and workers seized arms from the arsenal and moved to the presidential palace. They captured and shot Villarroel and suspended his body from a lamppost in the main square while the army remained aloof in the barracks.

=== Sexenio, 1946–1952 ===
The six years preceding the 1952 National Revolution are known as the sexenio. During this period, members of the Conservative Party tried to stem the growth of the left. Still, they failed because they could not halt the economic decline and control the growing social unrest. Enrique Hertzog Garaizabal (1947–49), who was elected president in 1947 after the interim rule of a provisional junta, formed a coalition cabinet that included not only the concordancia but also the PIR. He hoped to retain the backing of the Conservative Party forces by not increasing taxes, but he also tried to gain labor support, relying on the PIR to mobilize the workers.

The labor sector did not cooperate with the government, and the PIR became discredited because of its alliance with the conservative forces. In 1946, the workers endorsed the Thesis of Pulacayo, in which the miners called for permanent revolution and violent armed struggle for the working class. As the labor sector became more radical, the government resorted more and more to oppression, and confrontations increased. The dismissal of 7,000 miners and the brutal suppression of yet another uprising in Catavi in 1949 made any cooperation between the government and the workers impossible. The MNR emerged as the dominant opposition group. Although most of its leaders, including Paz Estenssoro, were in exile in Argentina, the party continued to be represented in the Chamber of Deputies and the Senate. During the sexenio, the party, despite its predominantly middle-class background, repeatedly took the side of the workers and adopted their radical ideology. The MNR also came to support the defense of Indian rights, as violence in the countryside increased when the promises given at the National Indigenous Congress were not fulfilled.

The MNR's attempts to gain power during the sexenio were unsuccessful. Its 1949 coup attempt failed, although, with the support of the workers and some military officers, it gained control of most major cities except La Paz. The MNR's attempt to gain power by legal means in 1951 also failed. In the presidential election of May 1951, the MNR's Paz Estenssoro, who remained in exile in Argentina, ran for president, and Siles Zuazo ran for vice president, both on a platform of nationalization and land reform. With the support of the POR and the newly formed Bolivian Communist Party (Partido Comunista de Bolivia, PCB), the MNR won with a clear plurality. The outgoing president persuaded the military to remove the MNR from taking power. Mamerto Urriolagoitia Harriague (1949–51), who succeeded the ailing Hertzog in 1949, backed a military junta under General Hugo Ballivián Rojas (1951–52). Under Ballivián, the government made a last futile attempt to suppress the growing unrest throughout the country.

By 1952, the Bolivian economy had deteriorated even further. The governments of the sexenio had been reluctant to increase taxes for the upper class and to reduce social spending, resulting in high inflation. The tin industry had stagnated since the Great Depression despite short revivals during World War II. Ore content had declined, and the richer veins were depleted, increasing tin production costs; at the same time, tin prices on the international market fell. A disagreement with the United States over tin prices temporarily halted exports and caused a decline in income, further hurting the economy. The agricultural sector lacked capital, and food imports had increased, reaching 19% of total imports in 1950. The land was unequally distributed - 1,000 hectares or more estates held 92% of the cultivable land. The social unrest that resulted from this economic decline increased during the last weeks before the 1952 National Revolution when a hunger march through La Paz attracted most sectors of society. The military was severely demoralized, and the high command called unsuccessfully for unity in the armed forces; many officers assigned themselves abroad, charged each other with coup attempts, or deserted.

== Bolivian National Revolution, 1952 ==
By the beginning of 1952, the MNR again tried to gain power by force, plotting with General Antonio Seleme, the junta member in control of internal administration and the National Police (Policía Nacional). On April 9, the MNR launched the rebellion in La Paz by seizing arsenals and distributing arms to civilians. This included a large number of indigenous miners and peasants. Armed miners marched on La Paz and blocked troops on their way to reinforce the city. After three days of fighting, the desertion of Seleme, and the loss of some 600 lives, the army surrendered, and Paz Estenssoro assumed the presidency on April 16, 1952. The 1952 revolution influenced the supporters of Chilean President Carlos Ibáñez del Campo who saw it as a model of national populism to follow.

=== Radical reforms ===
The "reluctant revolutionaries", as some called the leaders of the multiclass MNR, looked more to Mexico than to the Soviet Union, for example. But during the first year of Paz Estenssoro's presidency, the radical faction in the party, which had gained strength during the sexenio when the party embraced the workers and their ideology, forced the MNR leaders to act quickly. In July 1952, the government established universal suffrage, with neither literacy nor property requirements. In the first postrevolutionary elections in 1956, eligible voters increased from approximately 200,000 to nearly 1 million. The government also moved quickly to control the armed forces, purging many officers associated with past Conservative Party regimes and drastically reducing the forces' size and budget. The government also closed the Military Academy (Colegio Militar) and required that officers take an oath to the MNR.

The government then began nationalizing all mines of the three great tin companies. First, it made the export and sale of all minerals a state monopoly to be administered by the state-owned Mining Bank of Bolivia (Banco Minero de Bolivia, Bamin). Then, it set up the Mining Corporation of Bolivia (Corporación Minera de Bolivia, Comibol) as a semi-autonomous enterprise to run state-owned mines. On October 31, 1952, the government nationalized the three big tin companies, leaving the medium-sized mines untouched and promising compensation. In this process, two-thirds of Bolivia's mining industry was turned over to Comibol.

A far-reaching agrarian reform was the final important step taken by the revolutionary government. In January 1953, the government established the Agrarian Reform Commission, using advisers from Mexico, and decreed the Agrarian Reform Law the following August. These reform programs were meant to include breaking up large estates into minifundio or small parcels of land where individual families or small villages could work. The reforms were also meant to provide farmers with credit with which to buy tools, seed, and any other materials needed to operate their farms. Further, the reforms were intended to include technical assistance to farmers by teaching them to increase the productivity of their farms. However, many of these reforms were never put into place, and as a result, many of the new minifundio farms were eventually taken over again by rich landowners.

During the revolution's first years, miners wielded extraordinary influence within the government. This influence was based on miners' decisive role in the fighting of April 1952. In addition, armed militias of miners formed by the government to counterbalance the military had become a powerful force in their own right. Miners immediately organized the Bolivian Labor Federation (Central Obrera Boliviana, COB), which demanded radical change, participation in the government, and benefits for its members. MNR eventually gained the support of the campesinos when the Ministry of Peasant Affairs was created and when peasants were organized into syndicates. Peasants were granted land, and their militias were given large arms supplies.

The country faced severe economic problems as a result of the changes enacted by the government. High inflation, caused by increased social spending, also hurt the economy. The value of the peso fell from 60 to 12,000 to the United States dollar between 1952 and 1956, affecting primarily the urban middle class, which began to support the opposition. The bankrupt economy increased the factionalism within the MNR. Whereas the left wing demanded more government control over the economy, the right-wing hoped to solve the nation's problems with aid from the United States.

During the presidency of Hernán Siles Zuazo (1956–60), who won the election with 84% of the vote, United States aid reached its highest level. In 1957, the United States subsidized over 30% of Bolivia's budget. Siles Zuazo's stabilization plan seriously damaged the coalition of MNR and COB. The COB called immediately for a general strike, which threatened to destroy an already disrupted economy; the strike was called off only after passionate appeals by the president. To quell the unrest, Zuazo decided to rebuild the armed forces. During his administration, the strength of the armed forces grew due to a new concern for professionalism and training, technical assistance from the United States, and an increase in the size and budget of the military. In addition, the military's role in containing unrest increased its influence within the MNR government.

Conflicts within the MNR increased during Paz Estenssoro's second term of 1960–64. Together with the United States, the Federal Republic of Germany, and the Inter-American Development Bank, Paz Estenssoro endorsed the "Triangular Plan", which called for a restructuring of the tin-mining industry. The plan demanded the end of the workers' control over Comibol operations, the firing of workers, and a reduction in their salaries and benefits; it was strongly opposed by the COB and Lechín's MNR faction. In 1964, Paz Estenssoro decided to run again for president and accepted General René Barrientos Ortuño as vice presidential candidate. Because most opposition groups abstained, Paz Estenssoro was reelected with the support of the military and the peasants. Paz Estenssoro had come to rely increasingly on the military, whose role as a peacekeeper had made it a political arbiter. But this support was to prove unreliable; the military was already planning to overthrow him.
