= Bolivian National Revolution =

Revolution that occurred in Bolivia in 1952

Bolivian National Revolution (1952)
- Part of the Cold War
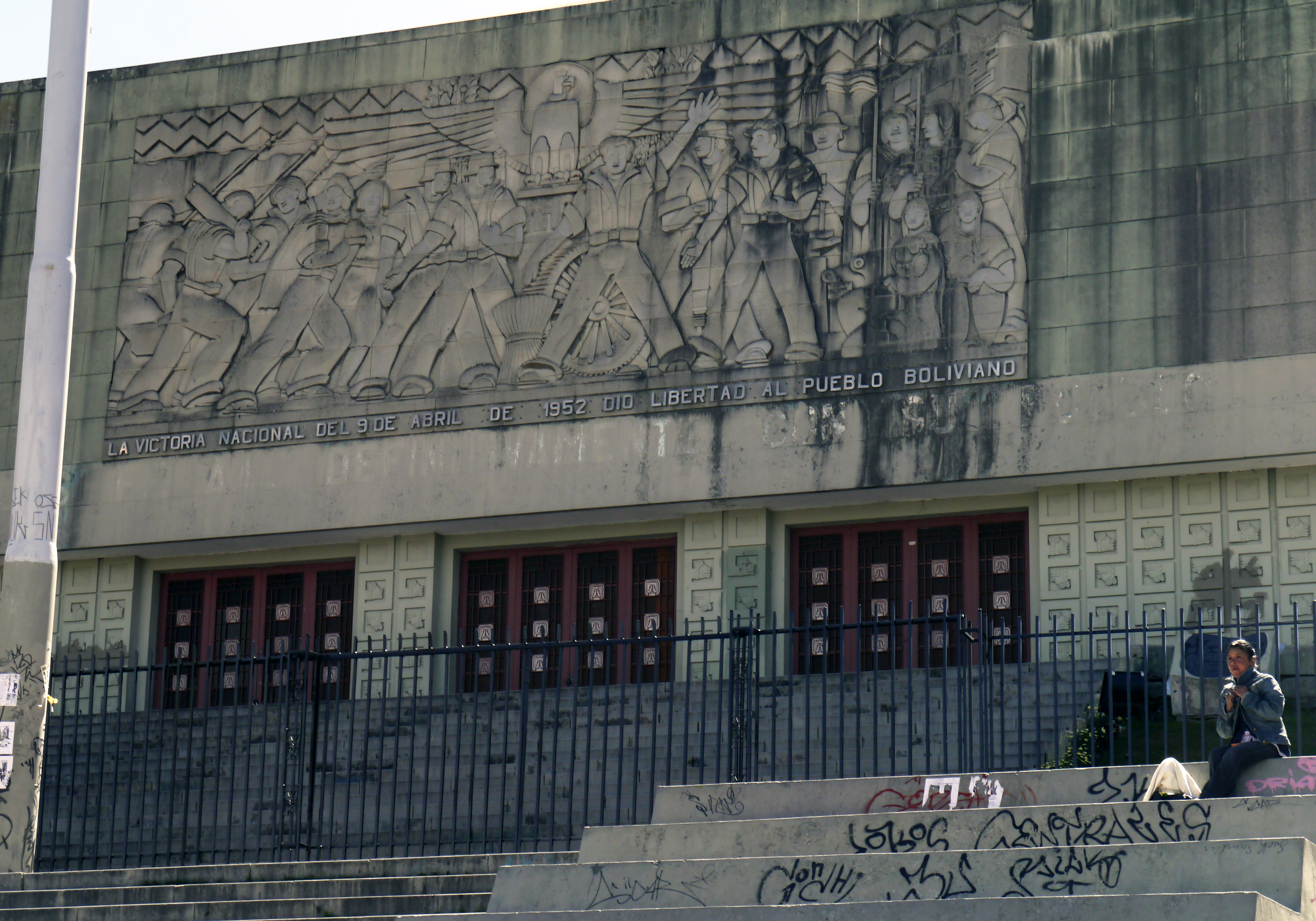
- Museum of National Revolution
- Date: 9–11 April 1952
- Location: Bolivia
- Goals: Resignation of President Mamerto Urriolagoitía; Replacement of the oligarchic political order The Revolutionary Nationalist Movement's recognition during elections.

Parties
Bolivian Government; Republican Socialist Unity Party	Revolutionary Nationalist Movement

Lead figures
Hugo Ballivián; Mamerto Urriolagoitía	Víctor Paz Estenssoro; Hernán Siles Zuazo; Juan Lechín Oquendo; Wálter Guevara Arze; Ñuflo Chávez Ortiz; Carlos Montenegro

The Bolivian Revolution of 1952 (Spanish: Revolución boliviana), also known as the Revolution of '52, was a series of political demonstrations led by the Revolutionary Nationalist Movement (MNR), which, in alliance with the liberals and the communists, sought to overthrow the ruling Bolivian oligarchy and implement a new socioeconomic model in Bolivia. Its main leaders were the former presidents Víctor Paz Estenssoro and Hernán Siles Zuazo. The MNR government after this Revolution lasted from 9 April 1952 until the coup of 4 November 1964. In these twelve years, there was a co-government and at the same time a power struggle between the party and the labor unions.

The Revolution of 1952 sought to implement the rights to vote in Bolivia, the distribution of land and State control over natural resources and the Bolivian economy. In addition, it incorporated the peasant and female sector into political life by establishing universal suffrage. Besides its democratizing effect the revolution also inaugurated an era of political populism. The statist economic system established by the revolution was dismantled in 1985 bringing an end to a severe economic crisis in the 1980s.

It was a political Revolution that at the time was equated to the Mexican Revolution and that preceded the Cuban Revolution. It developed in the context of the Cold War and was the only one of the social revolutions in Latin America that had the support of the United States.

== Background ==
The origins of this revolution may have begun during the Great Depression and Bolivia's defeat in the Chaco War. The Great Depression weakened the mining industry, sponsored the entry of the State into the economy through foreign exchange control and the allocation of tin export quotas among the different producers. Likewise, during the 20s, the nationalist government of Hernando Siles Reyes tried to apply corrective measures to some fundamental socioeconomic problems in the country. The following decade, the military governments of Germán Busch and David Toro deepened these measures with the influence of European nationalism.

On the other hand, the Chaco War resulted in a profound questioning of the political and social model in force in the 1930s. This spawned a whole generation of writers, thinkers, and political leaders who looked to ideologies for ways to solve the resource problems at the time. Among them, were Óscar Únzaga de la Vega, who led the Bolivian Socialist Falange (FSB), with influences from the Christian democracy of Jacques Maritain and the Social Doctrine of the Church, promoted above all by Pope Leo XIII and Pope Pius XI, and José Antonio Arze, founder of the Revolutionary Left Party.

In May 1949, after a general strike, a severe conflict broke out in the Siglo XX mines, owned by Simón Iturri Patiño, in the department of Potosí. President Mamerto Urriolagoitía ordered the arrest of some leaders, and in response the miners took two foreign employees hostage and ended up killing them. The government reacted with military intervention and the tragic Siglo XX massacre. On 27 August, the Civil War of 1949 broke out, through which the MNR led an uprising in four cities in Bolivia. After a few days, a revolutionary government emerged in the department of Santa Cruz in the east of the country, led by Edmundo Roca, a member of the Acción Obrera group, who joined the MNR.

During these events, the revolutionaries had under control more than half of the country, mainly in the departments of Cochabamba and Santa Cruz, and their capital cities. Armed clashes took place in the Santa Cruz towns of Yacuiba (under the command of Froilán Calleja), Camiri and Incahuasi. The Revolution proclaimed Víctor Paz Estenssoro as president and Edmundo Roca as vice president, despite the fact that the former was in exile. Meanwhile, Urriolagoitia mobilized the army commanded by General Ovidio Quiroga, who managed to reconquer first Cochabamba and then Santa Cruz. Bomber aircraft were required for military operations in both cities.

After retaking the main square, some leaders of the movement, such as Lidio Ustarez, were shot in the Manchego Barracks. Multiple workers took over the mines and a strike was declared in several mineral industrial centers. By 1 September, the government had retaken control of the country, and on 15 September, many of the Santa Cruz insurgents fled.

== Chronology ==
In May 1951, Victor Paz Estenssoro of the Revolutionary Nationalist Movement (MNR) won the presidential election, gaining large support of labor workers due to his anti-imperialist and anti-government sentiment. A Government Military Junta was immediately formed to prevent the MNR from coming to power. Given this reaction by the army, a year later, a coup d'état led by police general Antonio Seleme took place on April 9 with the civilian support of Hernán Siles Suazo and the mining leader Juan Lechin Oquendo, both from the MNR. The Police Corps had large involvement in initiating the revolt that later had the support of the population, the workers of Villa Victoria and the miners who arrived from the Milluni mine.

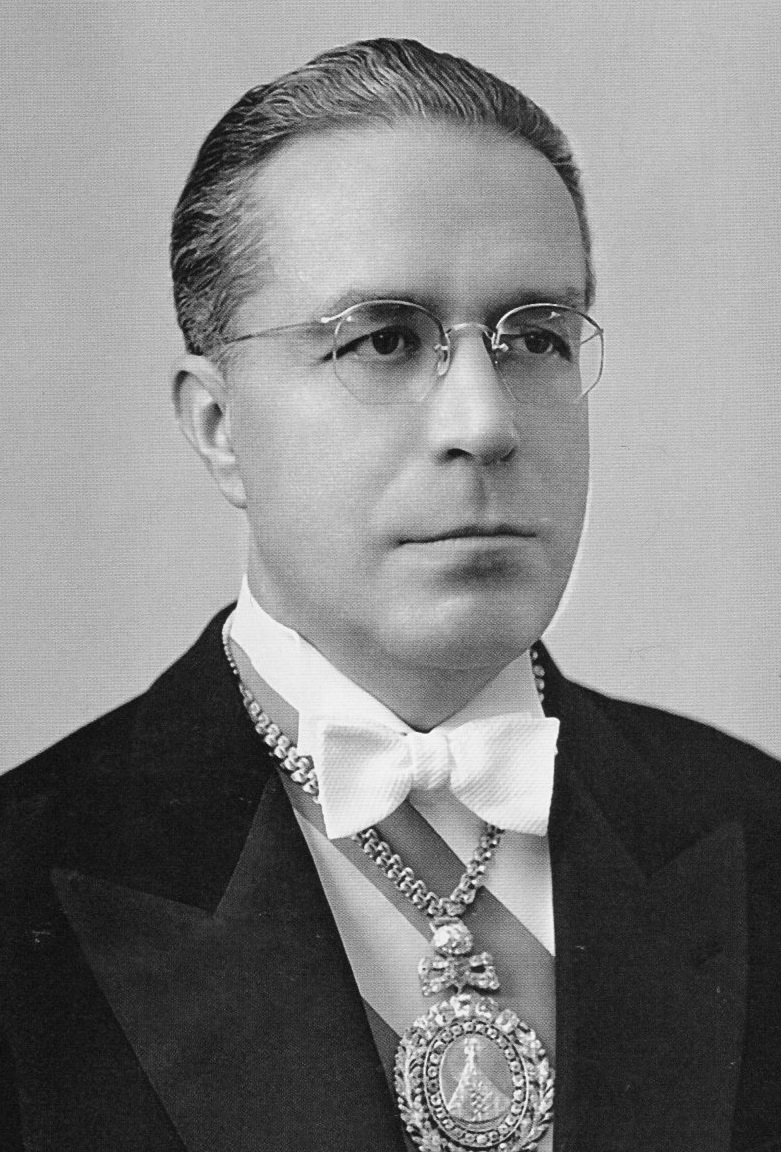
Víctor Paz Estenssoro

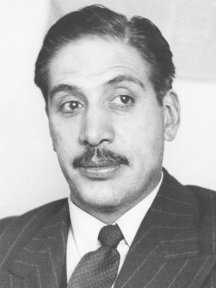
Juan Lechín

On 9 April 1952, the Carabineros and the Police Corps was institutionally mobilized by the Minister of the Interior, General Seleme, and they took over strategic institutions, such as prefectures and radio stations to spread the news. Also mobilized was Capitan Zeballos and 21 de Julio police regiments, the Departmental Police Brigade, cadets from the Police and Police School, and the General Directorate of Police and Carabineros, all with weapons and ammunition, to take over strategic areas. Arms and ammunition were distributed to the civilians of the MNR who attended, as well as to the many volunteers, workers, above all, coming from the Departmental Brigade, the General Directorate and the Carabineros regiments. The Plaza Antofagasta arsenal, taken over by Army Captain Israel Téllez, had already been distributed to civilian combatants. But General Torres Ortiz, involved in the uprising, distanced himself at the last minute and had the army quartered. Dr. Siles Suazo sought asylum at the Nunciature that same day. Seeing the uncontrollable popular overflow, General Seleme resigned from leading the "Revolutionary Government". Lechín Oquendo, top leader of the Miners' Federation, remained, directing the uprising in the streets with the slogans "Agrarian reform" and "Nationalization of mines."

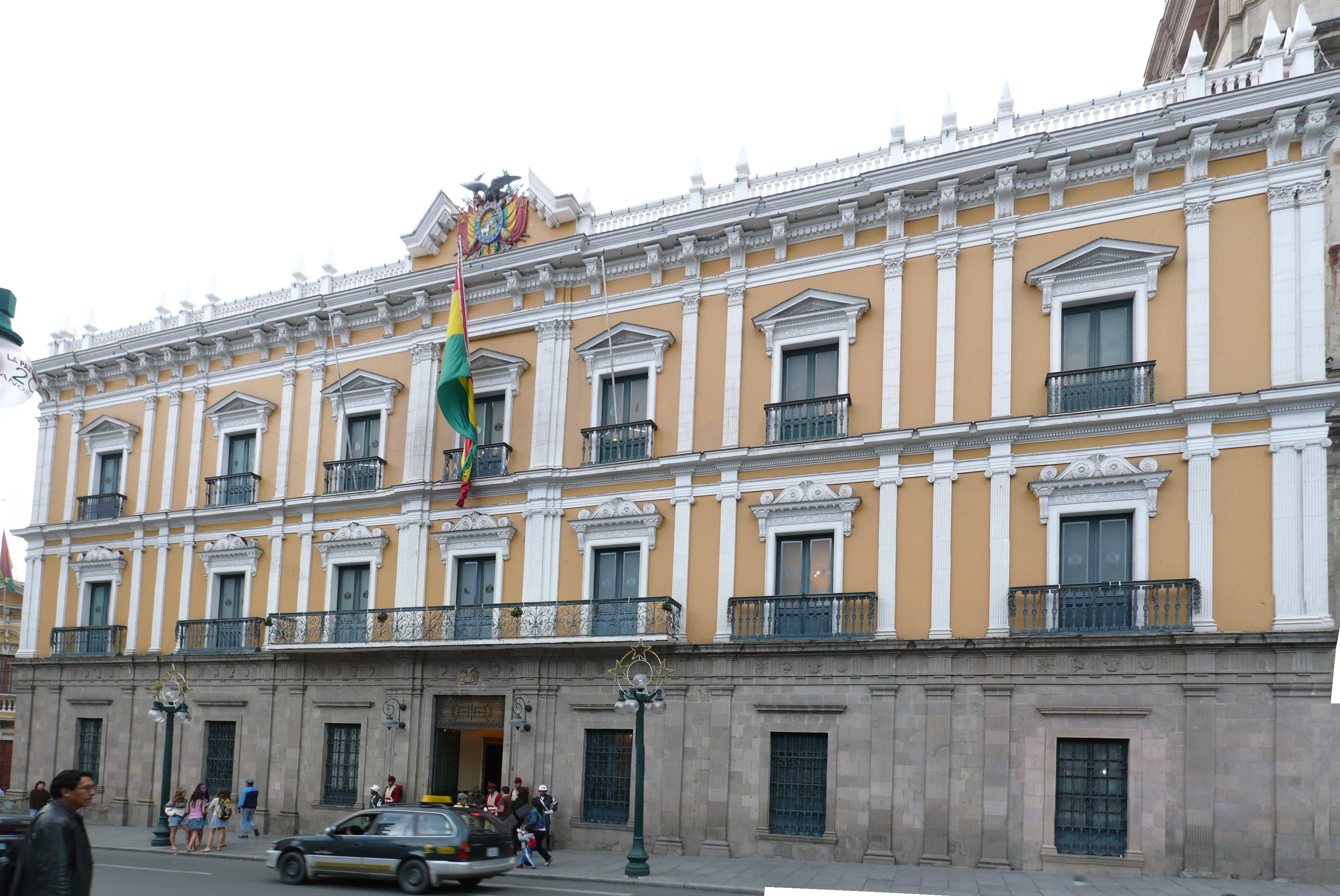
The Palacio Quemado

On Thursday, 10 April, the fighting continued. Lechin Oquendo, leading the Milluni miners, took the Hunting Air Group and from there sent planes to drop pamphlets over the Miraflores Great Barracks, urging them to surrender. The people stormed the Garita de Lima checkpoint, took out weapons and ammunition and continued fighting.

On Friday, 11 April, Lechín together with Rolando Requena went to take out the Great Barracks. Later, supported by the rebels, they took control of the Palacio Quemado, the official residence of the President of Bolivia. Hours later, the MNR politicians arrived, who did not see fit to carry out the "agrarian reform" (many of them were landowners) or the "Nationalization of mines." In the end, Dr. Siles Suazo relented because Lechín argued that those slogans led people to offer his life, and it was the immense crowd that was, at that very moment, outside, in the plaza, chanting the revolutionary victory hymn.

The defeat of the army claimed a balance of 490 dead. Hernán Siles Zuazo and Lechin Oquendo assumed command of the government until Víctor Paz Estenssoro, who had been in exile in Buenos Aires, returned a few days later.

On 12 April, the military surrendered. The prisoners were forced to parade through La Paz in underwear, guarded by the mine workers.

== Aftermath and reform ==
National Revolution, April 1952

=== Universal suffrage ===
On 24 June 1952, the government introduced universal suffrage. By granting the rights to vote for the illiterate, indigenous peoples and women, the number of voters increased from 205,000 (6.6% of the total population) in 1951 to 1,125,000 (33.8%) in 1956. The expansion of the right to vote was a radical measure in the Latin American context. For example, the vote for women was only granted in Brazil in 1934, in Chile in 1949, in Argentina and Colombia in 1951, in Mexico in 1955 and in Peru in 1956. The vote was granted to illiterates in 1980 in Peru and only in 1986 in Brazil.

=== Bolivian Workers' Center ===
The Bolivian Workers' Center was founded on 17 April 1952 with the aim of integrating the unions of miners, factories, railway workers, banks, graphics, industry and commerce employees, builders, bakers and farmers. Its first executive secretary was Juan Lechín Oquendo, who had been executive secretary of the Trade Union Federation of Bolivian Mine Workers (FSTMB) founded in 1944. Lechín was also Minister of Mines and Petroleum in Víctor Paz Estenssoro's first cabinet. Among the main objectives of the COB was to fight for the nationalization of the mines and railways, for the agrarian revolution and the repeal of anti-worker measures dictated by previous governments. Throughout the MNR government, the COB was "the radical revolutionary wing" of the revolution demanding the acceleration and deepening of social and economic changes. At the same time, labor relations during the MNR government were turbulent. It is estimated that an average of 350 strikes were carried out per year between 1952 and 1958 with a negative effect on production, making Bolivia amongst the highest in terms 'ghost worker' rates.

=== Educational reform ===
In 1952, 20.8% of the population of that age were in primary school and two thirds of the population (60.9%) were illiterate. A year after the start of the Revolution and in order to adapt the educational system to the reforms, in 1953 the government created the National Commission for Educational Reform, which presented its proposal in 120 days. It was not until 1955 that the Bolivian Education Code was enacted due to demands from the teaching profession. The Code divided the educational system into an urban area, in charge of the Ministry of Education, and rural education in charge of the recently created Ministry of Peasant Affairs. The Code sought to extend education to the majority and re-orient education towards technical education. It also raised the importance of castilianizing the Bolivia's Indigenous communities.

=== Disbandment of the army ===
The MNR reduced the size of the army from approximately 20,000 to 5,000 soldiers between April 1952 and January 1953 by discharging conscripts. In addition, it is estimated that the MNR retired around 300 officers. The army budget was cut from 20% of the general budget to half in 1953 and to 6.7% in 1957. In replacement of the army, the MNR formed urban and rural militias with workers and peasants. Between 1952 and 1956, the police and popular militias predominated in internal security and public order. From 1956 to 1964, the legitimacy of the militias and the importance of the police was reduced as the army was reconstituted, which predominated in internal security and public order.

=== Agrarian reform ===
Agrarian reform in Bolivia, 1953

In the mid-20th century, Bolivia had a latifundist agrarian system characterized by unequal land tenure, semi-feudal working conditions, and a low capacity to provide food to Bolivia. Approximately 4.5% of the population owned 70% of the agricultural land. Agricultural work consisted of a system of labor control through access to land through labor benefits. Also, the indigenous people had to contribute with seeds, tools and animals to carry out the work. In addition to agricultural labor obligations, the indigenous people were obliged to offer personal services left over during the colonial periods to the landowner and his family. The inefficiency of the agricultural sector was such that between 35 and 40 percent of imports were food. In January 1953, an Agrarian Reform Commission was organized, chaired by Vice President Hernán Siles Zuazo with members of opposition parties. On 2 August 1953, in Ucureña, Cochabamba, the Agrarian Reform Decree was signed. The decree offered indemnity to landowners and granted hacienda lands to Indians through their unions and communities on the condition that they not be sold personally.

The reform implementation system was cumbersome. Of the 15,322 cases initiated between 1953 and 1966, only 7,322 or 48.8% were concluded. Between 1954 and 1968, the National Agrarian Reform Service had processed eight million of the approximately thirty-six million hectares to be distributed. In the subsequent 30 years, however, an additional 39 million hectares (reaching a total of 47 million hectares) were distributed with more than 650,000 beneficiaries.

== Controversy ==
Although the Bolivian Revolution is considered one of the three most important social revolutions in Latin America (alongside the Mexican Revolution and the Cuban Revolution) it was not exempt from criticism. Its main shortcomings revolve around the brutality of the Political Control organisation (Control Político), the governing body of the MNR which was compared to the Nazi Gestapo. This institution promoted a strong repression against opponents of the new regime.

The MNR installed concentration camps in rural towns in the Bolivian Andes, such as Catavi, Uncía, Corocoro and Curahuara de Carangas. Numerous political opponents of the MNR, both communists and Falangists, were tortured in overcrowded prisons.

A systematic intentional inflation was initiated, to break the power of the elites. In 1952, the exchange rate was 190 Bolivian pesos per US dollar. Four years later the exchange rate was 15,000 per US dollar. Commenting on the failure of other revolutions, Minister of Foreign Affairs Wálter Guevara Arze said "Liberalism liquidated conservatism politically but not economically. This was a great mistake: Those who retain economic power will one day recover political power."

It was in the mid-sixties, after the coup d'état led by General René Barrientos, that the extent of the human rights violations perpetrated by the MNR regime began to be revealed. Among the victims of the concentration camps are the philosophers Numa Romero del Carpio and Roberto Prudencio Romecín, whose homes were also looted. The historian Alberto Crespo Rodas, Marshal Bernardino Bilbao Rioja, several journalists from the newspaper La Razón and members of the opposition parties were also imprisoned.

== See also ==
- Bolivian war of independence
