= 1964 Bolivian coup d'état =

Deposition of Víctor Paz Estenssoro

Date	November 3–4, 1964
Location	Bolivia
Status	Víctor Paz Estenssoro overthrown

Belligerents
(Bolivia) Bolivian government	(Bolivia) Bolivian Army

Commanders and leaders
(Bolivia) Víctor Paz Estenssoro	(Bolivia) René Barrientos (Bolivia) Alfredo Ovando Candía

1964 Bolivian coup d'état in Bolivia was a coup under the leadership of Vice-president René Barrientos and Bolivian Army commander-in-chief Alfredo Ovando Candía against the President Víctor Paz Estenssoro, leader of the Bolivian National Revolution of 1952, who recently had been re-elected for his third term in office.

There are those who label the November 4th coup as a counterrevolution. Both Barrientos and Ovando called their coup process a "Restorative Revolution", alleging a continuation of the 1952 Revolution. The fall of the Revolutionary Nationalist Movement (MNR) would begin an 18-year period of military regimes in Bolivia (1964–1982).

The coup was condemned by the U.S. government.

== Prelude ==
Between 1960 and 1964, the United States increased its aid to Bolivia under the Alliance for Progress by 600%, giving US$205 million in economic aid and US$23 million in various loans. The first 35 Peace Corps volunteers arrived in early 1962. The increase in world tin prices also helped to stabilize Bolivia's economy, which had been near collapse during the first revolutionary presidency of Víctor Paz Estenssoro. Between 1961 and 1965 the Bolivian GNP rose by average 5.7% annually.

As successive presidential terms were allowed by the constitutional amendments of 1961, Paz Estenssoro decided to run for the third term. The leftist vice-president Juan Lechin (1960–64), who himself wanted to run for president in 1964, was forced to resign as vice-president and then sent as ambassador to Italy by Estenssoro. On December 5, 1963, left wing supporters of Lechin resigned from the government. By this time Lechin split from the MNR and formed Revolutionary Party of the Nationalist Left.

When Paz Estenssoro jailed several militant labour activists, miners in Catavi mines responded by seizing a group of hostages, including four US citizens. The crisis was resolved after Lechin's mediation. This event marked a break in alliance between the Paz Estenssoro's MNR and miners, which had begun in 1942.

The Bolivian army, which had been rebuilt and increased in size during recent years, provided an alternative power base to Paz Estenssoro. After some hesitation, air force General René Barrientos was picked by Paz Estenssoro as his running mate for the May 1964 elections, and the army became more involved in the politics.

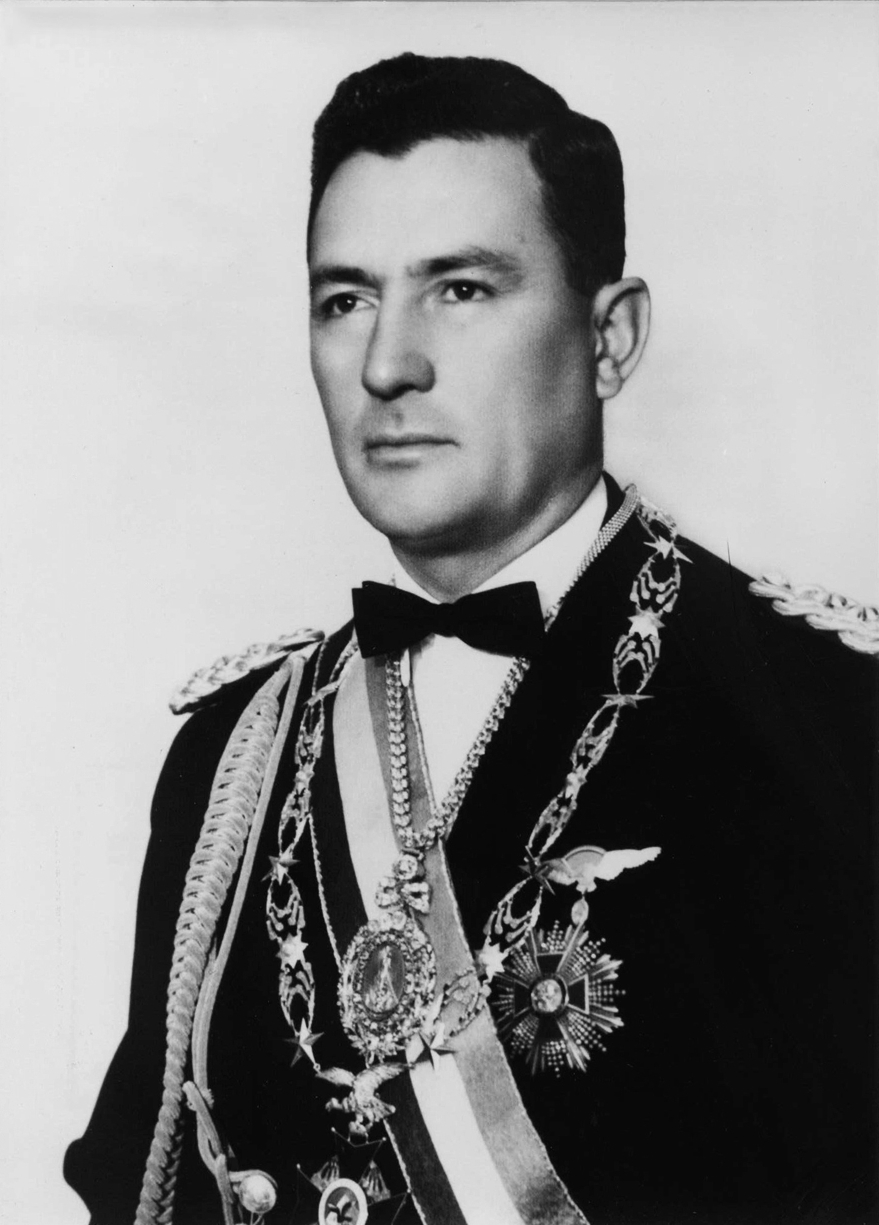
René Barrientos

During the next six months internal unrest steadily increased, as miners went on strike and rioted. Various politicians, including Lechin, asked Barrientos to intervene. In late October, Paz Estenssoro asked the army to quell a miner uprising near Oruro. After armed clashes between the army and miners on October 28, Barrientos and Ovando decided to strike and launched their coup on November 3.

== Coup ==
The coup began early on November 3, when troops of the Ingavi regiment rebelled in La Paz. By the evening all the major military units had backed the coup and on in the afternoon of November 4 Paz Estenssoro with his family was exiled to Lima, as Barrientos and Ovando established their junta. Some sporadic clashes between worker's militia and army were reported, but they soon subsided. It was Ovando who publicly announced formation of the junta but by the evening of the 4th the more popular and constitutionally acceptable vice-president Barrientos emerged as the leader.

== After the coup ==
As Paz Estenssoro with his US supported economic policies had alienated radical miners, and with his third term other MNR politicians, former MNR leaders Lechin and Guevara supported the coup, with Guevara becoming the foreign minister in 1967.

One week after the coup Barrientos demanded that miner and worker militias surrender the weapons that they had had since the Revolution of April 9, 1952. Prolonged conflicts with miners followed. In order to reduces the losses of state-owned mines, miner's salaries were reduced by 50%. César Lora, leader of the miners from Siglo XX mine, was killed on July 29, 1965. By the end of 1965 a united leftist opposition People's Democratic Council was formed.

The officially released data shows that covert USA expenditures in Bolivia between fiscal year 1963 and fiscal year 1965 were as follows: fiscal year 1963— $337,063; fiscal year 1964—$545,342; and fiscal year 1965—$287,978. Most of it went to support the center and right wings of the ruling MNR party.

Already after the coup, CIA allegedly contributed US$600,000 to Barrientos election campaign in 1966 and Gulf Oil Corp. donated additional US$460,000 between 1966 and 1969.

=== Co-presidency ===
Barrientos lacked sufficient authority to have himself quickly elected president, so on May 7, 1965, he announced indefinite postponement of September elections and concentrated on eliminating his leftist opponents. He sent troops to take over state owned mines of COMIBOL and deported his former supporter Juan Lechin. The armed clashes with miners created an open split between Barrientos and Ovando, who withdrew troops from some of the occupied mines. On May 26, 1965, Ovando was installed as co-president and commander in chief of armed forces along with Barrientos in an effort to prevent split in the ruling junta and armed forces between leftist and rightist elements.

During 1966 Barrientos received covert financial aid from the US, which was caused by the fact that public office holders had to resign from their office 180 days before the elections. Barrientos followed this rule and this left him without means to pursue an election campaign. During this time Ovando was the president of Bolivia. Elections were held in July 1966, and Barrientos, as the presidential candidate of the Front of the Bolivian Revolution, won with 67% of vote and was officially inaugurated on August 6, 1966.
