= San Juan massacre =

Massacre in Bolivia

- Part of the Ñancahuazú Guerrilla
- Native name: Masacre de San Juan
- Date: June 24, 1967
- Location: Catavi, Bolivia
- Type: Violent crackdown
- Organised by: René Barrientos; COMIBOL; Empresa Minera Catavi
- Participants: Bolivian Army
- Outcome: FSTMB issued a call for a state of emergency to all other miners' districts
- Deaths: 20-?
- Injuries: 72-?
- Missing: unknown

The San Juan massacre is the name given to an attack by the Bolivian military on miners of the Siglo XX-Catavi tin mining complex in Bolivia. The attack occurred on 24 June 1967, in the early hours of the traditional festival of the Night of San Juan which is a winter solstice festival in the Southern Hemisphere. The army was acting under the orders of Bolivian president René Barrientos.

== Background ==
President René Barrientos believed that a new guerrilla resistance to his dictatorship was brewing among the mining communities, inspired by Che Guevara's small force which was operating in Bolivia at the time. The ambush was planned to crush any attempt at organized resistance among the miners. The miners' union, the FSTMB, had called for an enlarged national meeting for the day after the Night of San Juan in the miners' settlement of Llallagua XX. Footage from a British Pathé newsreel demonstrated the tension in the area, with miners starting a strike. On 17 June 1967, The New York Times reported that miners in the area were threatening to strike.

== Death Of Che ==
The assembled miners and families celebrated the festival of the longest night of 23 to 24 June with bonfires, firecrackers and dynamite as well as traditional foods and beverages, not knowing that units of the elite Rangers and Camacho regiments of Oruro had already surrounded them. At around 5 in the morning the soldiers poured out of the train carriages and descended on the assembled mass, attacking with machine guns and dynamite. The electricity had been cut shortly before the attack, so the local radio station La Voz del Minero (the Voice of the Miner) was unable to warn the miners or spread the news to the outside world. The soldiers shot men, women, and children at close range. Many of the miners and families were either asleep or intoxicated after the all night festivities and the sound of the initial shots and explosions were confused with the traditional firecrackers of the celebration.

The bulk of the victims were in the encampment called La Salvadora around the Cancañiri railway station.

Under the conditions of the military junta, media reporting of the massacre was severely limited and no official investigation followed.

La Patria newspaper reported that:

At 4:55 yesterday, mining populations in this area woke up with intense firing of rifles, machine guns and dynamite explosions, when army forces and the mining police occupied the mining camps in bloody action.

Initial estimates of casualties were 20 dead and 72 wounded.

== References in historiography and literature ==
The massacre was witnessed by the writer Victor Montoya at the age of 9.

It all began when the mining families were returning home to sleep after celebrating the winter solstice around bonfires, where they had danced and sung to the rhythm of cuecas and huayños, accompanied by alcoholic punches, traditional foods, coca, cigarettes, bursts of dynamite and firecrackers. As this was going on among the civilian population of Llallagua and the mining camps of Siglo XX (20th Century), troops from the Ranger and Camacho regiments, which just hours before had surrounded them under cover of night, opened fire from every direction, with a toll of some twenty killed and seventy wounded amid stabs of cold and the whistling of the wind.

It is estimated that the soldiers and officials, who entered from the north between nine and eleven that night, had left from the city of Oruro by train on the afternoon of June 23rd. The railroad watchman who saw them arrive, armed, in the train cars tried to get the word out to union leaders and the radio stations, but was intimidated by the military officials, who continued their march. And so, at about five in the morning, the shooting began, targeting men, women and children. At first, surprised by the attack, some confused the machine-gun bursts with firecrackers, and the booming of the mortars with their own dynamite explosions.

The company, complicit with those committing the massacre, cut off the electricity at dawn, so that the radio stations could not alert the local people; while the soldiers, stationed on San Miguel hill, near Canañiri, La Salvadora, and Río Seco, descended steep slopes like donkey pack trains, occupying by firepower the camps, the Miners’ Plaza, the union headquarters, and the Voice of the Miner radio station. There they murdered union leader Rosendo García Maismann, who, barricaded behind a window, defended the radio station with an old rifle in hand.

— Victor Montoya

A 1971 film documentary "The Night of San Juan" (original title "El coraje del pueblo") was directed by Jorge Sanjinés based on a script by Óscar Soria Gamarra.

== See also ==
Other massacres in the same location

- Catavi massacre, 1942
- Christmas Massacre (Bolivia) 1996
