= Pedro Montes =

Bolivian politician (born 1960)

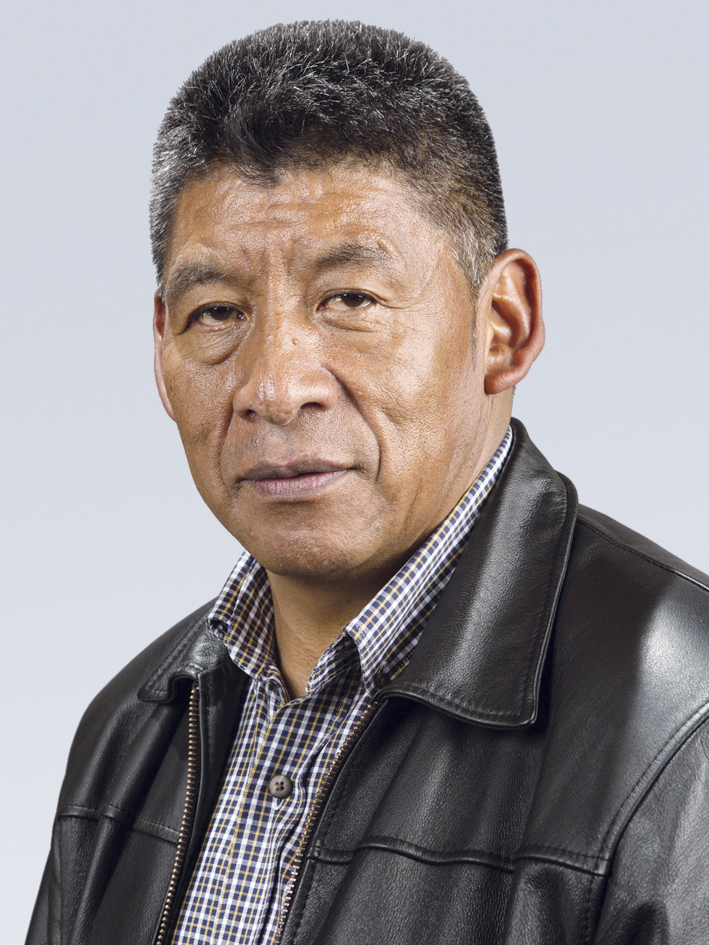
- Official portrait, 2018

Senator for Oruro
- In office 18 January 2015 – 3 November 2020
- Substitute: Lourdes Molina
- Preceded by: Roxana Camargo
- Succeeded by: Rubén Gutiérrez

Executive Secretary of the Bolivian Workers' Center
- In office 29 June 2006 – 23 January 2012
- Preceded by: Jaime Solares
- Succeeded by: Juan Carlos Trujillo

Personal details
- Born: Pedro Montes Gonzales; 14 April 1960 (age 66) Catavi, Potosí, Bolivia
- Party: Movement for Socialism
- Other political affiliations: Revolutionary Workers'
- Occupation: Mineworker; politician; trade unionist

Pedro Montes Gonzales (born 14 April 1960) is a Bolivian mineworker, politician, and trade unionist who served as senator for Oruro from 2015 to 2020. A member of the Movement for Socialism, he previously served as executive secretary of the Bolivian Workers' Center from 2006 to 2012.

Born in Catavi, Montes spent most of his life as a mineworker at complexes in Oruro and Potosí. Having got his start in the sector's organized labor movement in the mid-1980s, he progressively climbed the ranks of the country's largest workers' syndicates, holding membership within the Syndical Federation of Bolivian Mineworkers and serving as executive secretary of the Oruro Departmental Workers' Center. In 2006, he was elected chairman of the Bolivian Workers' Center, the country's national trade union center.

As head of one of the most powerful syndicates in the country, Montes collaborated closely with the socialist administration of President Evo Morales, whose government took a more cooperative approach towards organized labor. Although this alliance bore fruit in the form of concessions towards workers, Montes also drew criticism for being too appeasing towards the government, and he is cited as having significantly contributed to his organization's gradual co-option into Morales's party, the Movement for Socialism. In 2014, he was elected as a senator for the party.

== Early life and career ==
Pedro Montes was born on 14 April 1960 in Catavi, a small mining community nestled in the rural foothills of Llallagua, part of the Bustillo Province of northern Potosí. The mineral-rich region is home to significant deposits of tin ore, for which it became the site of one of the largest mining complexes in the country. Montes was raised in and around these mines; the son of a mineworker, he was groomed to take up the trade at a young age and began replacing his father as a laborer for the Catavi Mining Company by 18. He got his career start working some of the lowest-ranking jobs within the mine's internal hierarchy, beginning as a minecart operator before later becoming a chasquiri—messenger and tool collector.

=== Trade union career ===
Montes began actively participating in Catavi's trade syndicates around 1984, the year he was elected to represent the Beza shaft as its sectional delegate. His entrance into the sector began at a time of effervescence for the mining proletariat, hot off the successful fight for the recovery of Bolivian democracy, in which the labor movement was one of the main protagonists. Montes had himself taken part in these conflicts, for which he suffered reprisals from the military regimes of the day.

In the years following the recuperation of democracy, Montes continued to play an active role in labor disputes, such as during the 1985 struggle for an increased minimum wage. With the collapsing price of tin in the mid-1980s, much of the labor movement's power came crashing down, and the mining population was significantly reduced. Montes became part of the small contingent of laborers that—willingly or not—continued working the mines after the crash.

In 1988, Montes transferred to the Huanuni mine in Oruro, where he began scaling the ranks of the area's trade syndicates. By the early 1990s, he had acceded to the directorate of the Syndical Federation of Bolivian Mineworkers, and he was later elected executive secretary of the Oruro Departmental Workers' Center. During this time, he was thrice expelled from the state-owned Bolivian Mining Corporation, only gaining back membership through his personal relations with influential figures such as Oscar Salas.

=== Bolivian Workers' Center ===
In June 2006, during its XIV National Congress, Montes capped off his union rise with his election as executive secretary of the Bolivian Workers' Center (COB). His designation came at a time of weakness for the organization, which in recent years had lost influence to emerging peasant unions and organized social movements aligned with the Movement for Socialism (MAS-IPSP), whose leader, Evo Morales, was elected president the year prior. The MAS had sought to have its own representative elected to head the COB, opening the door for amendments to the organization's statute that would allow aligned indigenous and peasant organizations membership. Although Montes was adamant in his assertion that the COB would maintain its political independence from the government, his tenure nonetheless saw the organization grow far closer to it than it had under previous leaders. In 2007, for example, he joined the National Coordinator for Change, a political arm of the MAS; in 2008, he signed an alliance with the organization on behalf of the COB, and by 2009, most of the entity's forty member groups had originated from the COB. In part, this burgeoning alliance had less to do with Montes and more with Morales, whose administration struck a markedly more conciliatory cord with the COB, which contrasted with the adversarial position taken by the liberal governments that preceded him.

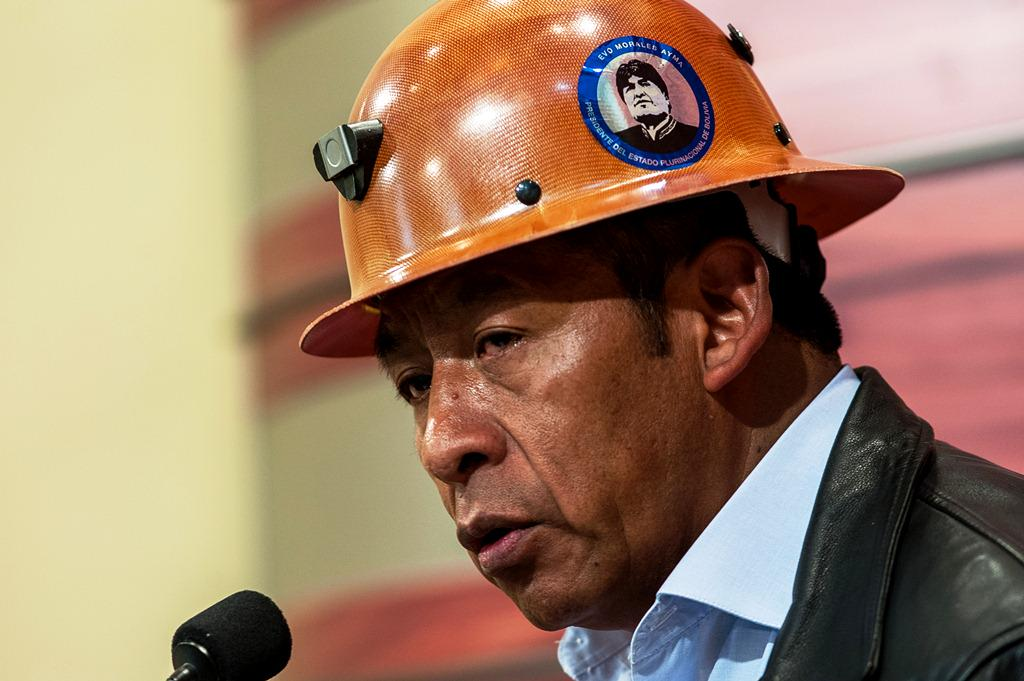
As head of the COB, Montes drew criticism for his alleged closeness with the government.

Still, under Montes, the COB played a visibly less active role in protesting government actions. It would not be until May 2010—four years into Morales's presidency—that the organization took the step of declaring a general strike, spurred by discontent with that year's comparatively low minimum wage increase. Even then, the protest collapsed after Montes reached an agreement with the government, which left intact the previously announced salary hike in exchange for lowering the retirement age for miners. The move drew the ire of more radical members of the labor movement, who accused him of selling out other sectors in favor of his own. Some called for his removal; María Elena Soria of the La Paz Federation of Urban Teachers declared that Montes had "sold himself body and soul to the ruling party."

More importantly, Montes's deal fomented dissent within the COB's leadership, with his own second-in-command, General Secretary Felipe Machaca, expressing opposition to it. By the end of the year, Machaca and other COB leaders had fully split with Montes, who they considered "servile" to the MAS. "Pedro Montes now defends the neoliberal model and has left the fight for ... the union's political independence," Machaca stated. Montes, for his part, partially conceded on his affinity towards the government: "They can call me pro-government, but [at least] I'm not a rightist or a fascist"; however, he refuted more literal charges against him: "To accuse [me] of selling out, as if I had ever received anything from the government. Not one boliviano and not one cent, and this I can say with all my honor and with my head held high."

In the ensuing years, Montes's COB found itself playing catchup to other sectors, which began independently mobilizing when faced with a grievance. When Montes did enter his organization into the fray, internal and external pressures forced him to go on the offensive. Such was the case in 2010, when he became considerably more confrontational with the government regarding a dispute over the price of natural gas—a disposition spurred by a violent attack he suffered by workers discontent with his administration. By 2011—faced with an upcoming national congress—Montes called for mass mobilizations demanding a higher minimum wage for certain public officials. Although that crisis resulted in the postponement of the COB's next congress—thus extending Montes's term for another year—subsequent developments did not turn out in his favor. When the COB did finally convene in early 2012, Montes sought a second term but was unexpectedly defeated by Juan Carlos Trujillo, putting an end to his tenure as the organization's executive secretary.

== Chamber of Senators ==
=== Election ===
Following the end of his term as head of the COB, Montes returned to Huanuni, where, in 2013, he launched a campaign for the post of general secretary of the sector's leading trade union: the Mixed Syndicate of Mineworkers of Huanuni. His front, the Revolutionary Brigade of Syndical Unity, won in a landslide, attaining over sixty percent of the roughly 4,000 union members' vote. Sworn in on 31 October at a ceremony attended by Morales, Montes took his oath of office with his left fist raised—a symbolic gesture distinguishing MAS partisans.

Montes's year-long tenure centered around the campaign for the 2014 general election, during which time the COB and its member organizations actively debated whether to contest the race independently or support Morales's reelection bid. Ultimately, the organization postponed previous plans to form its own Workers' Party, electing instead to align with the MAS in exchange for representation on the party's parliamentary lists. In January, Huanuni's mineworkers signed their own alliance with the MAS, for which Montes was incorporated onto the party's list as a candidate for a seat in the Senate in representation of Oruro. Despite his relatively low placement—third of four available slots—Montes won, owing to the MAS's wide victory in the department, which granted it complete control over Oruro's Senate seats.

=== Tenure ===
As a senator, Montes played a prominent role within the MAS's internal structure. He served as leader of the party's caucus in the Chamber of Senators for the first two years of his term and was reelected for a third non-consecutive time in 2018. In all, he led the MAS caucus for three of the six years he was in office. Upon the conclusion of his third leadership term in 2019, Montes positioned himself to be elected president of the Senate for its closing year, but the post was instead granted to Adriana Salvatierra.

Following the collapse of the Morales government later that year, Montes was elected to form part of the Senate's reconstituted directorate, where he served as first vice president. Amid internal discontent over Senate President Eva Copa's more conciliatory stance towards the interim government of Jeanine Áñez, some MAS partisans put forward Montes as a viable replacement, given his closer relations with Morales. Ultimately, however, challenges to Copa's presidency failed to manifest, and she was ratified as head of the Senate in early 2020, whereas Montes was replaced as first vice president by Senator Omar Aguilar.

Montes was not nominated for reelection in either 2019 or the rerun general elections of 2020. Nonetheless, at the end of his term, he remained in the Legislative Assembly, where he continued to exercise public functions as a minor official into 2021.

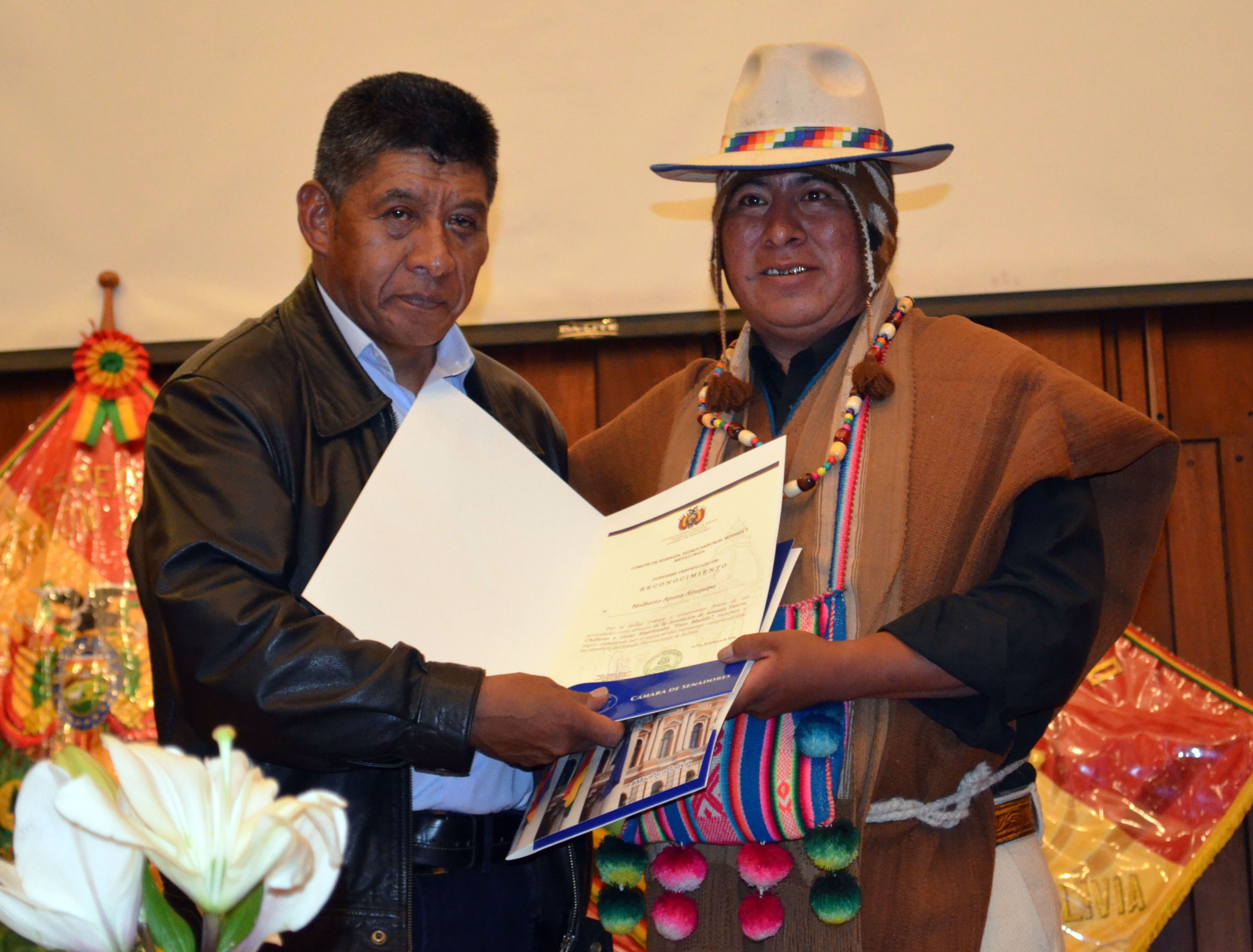
Montes delivers a certificate of recognition to an indigenous leader.

=== Commission assignments ===
- Chamber of Senators Directorate (First Vice President: 2019–2020)
- Territorial Organization of the State and Autonomies Commission
  - Departmental Autonomies Committee (Secretary: 2018–2019)
- Plural Economy, Production, Industry, and Industrialization Commission
  - Energy, Hydrocarbons, Mining, and Metallurgy Committee (Secretary: 2017–2018, 2019, 2020)
- Rural Native Indigenous Peoples and Nations and Interculturality Commission
  - Cultures, Interculturality, and Cultural Heritage Committee (Secretary: 2015–2017)

== Ideology and personal life ==
I have a pending debt of honor to my family; I was an absentee for the union fight. Honor and respect to my wife, apologies to my children, but I hope that history judges my actions [favorably]. It was all for my conviction to class identity, my class consciousness, and my responsibility to the history of the mineworkers' movement.

— Pedro Montes

Montes belongs to the second generation of COB leaders whose ideological formation derives from the paramount labor activists of the day, namely: Filemón Escóbar, Juan Lechín, Víctor López, Edgar Ramírez, Simón Reyes, and Oscar Salas. In his youth, Montes was a member of Guillermo Lora's Revolutionary Workers' Party. Although distanced from it by the time of his assumption as leader of the COB, he nonetheless retained the "Trotskyist principles" he acquired as a member of the party.

During his tenure as head of the COB, Montes also participated in sports organizing. In 2010, he was elected president of the board of directors of Club 31 de Octubre – Huanuni. The team, later renamed to Club Huanuni Mining Company, attained legal status in 2012. It is owned by the Huanuni mining district and represents the approximately 5,000 mineworkers employed by the Bolivian Mining Corporation.

== Electoral history ==
Electoral history of Pedro Montes
Year	Office	Party	Votes			Result	Ref.
Year	Office	Party	Total	%	P.	Result	Ref.
2013	General secretary	Revolutionary Brigade of Syndical Unity (Note: Front organized to contest union elections.)	2,590	61.27%	1st	Won	
2014	Senator	Movement for Socialism	166,360	66.42%	1st	Won	(Note: Presented on an electoral list. The data shown represents the share of the vote the entire party/alliance received in that constituency.)
Source: Plurinational Electoral Organ | Electoral Atlas

Trade union offices
Preceded by Jaime Solares	Executive Secretary of the Bolivian Workers' Center; 2006–2012	Succeeded by Juan Carlos Trujillo
Preceded by Ronald Colque	General Secretary of the Mixed; Syndicate of Mineworkers of Huanuni; 2013–2015	Succeeded by Javier Canchari
Senate of Bolivia
Preceded by Roxana Camargo	Senator for Oruro; 2015–2020; Served alongside: Rubén Medinaceli, Lineth Guzmán, Plácida Espinoza	Succeeded by Rubén Gutiérrez
Preceded by Julio Salazar	Leader of the Senate; Movement for Socialism Caucus; 2015–2017	Succeeded by Nélida Sifuentes
Preceded by Nélida Sifuentes	Leader of the Senate; Movement for Socialism Caucus; 2018–2019	Succeeded by Efraín Chambi
Preceded by Rubén Medinaceli	First Vice President of the Senate; 2019–2020	Succeeded by Omar Aguilar
