= Christmas Massacre =

Christmas Massacre may refer to:

- Christmas Day Massacre (El Salvador), 1922 event
- Christmas Massacre (Italy), 1984 event
- Christmas Massacre (Bolivia), 1996 event
- 2008 Christmas massacres in the Democratic Republic of the Congo
- Waukesha Christmas parade attack, 2021 event
