= 2013 Palmasola prison riot =

Fatal unrest in Santa Cruz, Bolivia

Palmasola prison riot
- Date: August 23, 2013
- Location: Palmasola, Santa Cruz, Bolivia
- Cause: Gang rivalry
- Deaths: 31
- Injuries: 37 (serious)

On August 23, 2013, a prison riot broke out at Palmasola, a maximum-security prison in Santa Cruz, Bolivia. The riot started when members of one cell block attacked a rival gang in another, using propane tanks as flame throwers. Thirty-one people were killed, including an 18-month-old child who was living at the prison. Thirty-seven others were seriously injured. The riot led to calls for reform in the Bolivian prison system, which is plagued by overcrowding and long delays in the trial system.

== Background ==
Palmasola is Bolivia's largest prison and holds about 3,500 prisoners. Like many prisons in Latin America, guards exert minimal control over what happens within the prison, leading to it being described as a "prison town". Guards instead concentrate only on securing the perimeter of the facility. According to former inmates, almost anything can be obtained in the prison. Businesses operate inside the prison to supply weapons and drugs. Under Bolivian law, children under the age of six may live in a prison with one of their parents. Four out of five prisoners in Palmasola are awaiting trial.

Prisons in Latin America are among the most dangerous in the world, and the ones in Bolivia are the second most overcrowded at 233% overcapacity (just behind El Salvador, with 299%). The driving factors in overcrowding are pre-trial detentions and judicial backlogs. At least 85% of the inmates in the country have pending trials/convictions. Many are imprisoned for minor drug offenses under Law 1008, a controversial legislation created in 1988 that places heavy penalties on drug offenders. In addition, prisons in Latin America are often run by inmates affiliated with a criminal group. The gang leaders, known as "delegates", may charge fees to other inmates in exchange for certain benefits, such as occupying personal cells, enjoying family visits, or having televisions. Prisons in Bolivia may have so-called "life insurance" fees, mandatory extortion payments among inmates that range from $100 to $500. The fees are controlled by prison gangs, and those who fail to pay may face torture or death. Egregious as these abuses are, as of 2013, organized crime activities in Bolivia's penitentiary system are not at the levels of influence observed in most prisons of Central America, Brazil, Peru and Venezuela, where a significant proportion of outside organized crime is commanded from inside prisons.

== Riot ==
At approximately 6am on August 23, 2013, a riot broke out at Palmasola when a gang living in cell block B broke a hole in the wall that separated it from cell block A, the home of a rival gang. They then used machetes, small knives, and sticks to attack their rivals. The inmates used a number of propane tanks, first to suffocate victims with the gas, then set the tanks on fire, using them as flame throwers or bombs. Shell casings were found at the scene, but it was unclear whether guns had been used in the conflict. Fire spread quickly as straw mattresses caught fire, trapping some prisoners and causing others to jump off the roof in an attempt to escape the fire. A hundred additional police were dispatched to regain control of the prison; even so, it took four hours to do so. According to local politician Maria Inez Galvez, there were not enough guards on duty to take all the wounded to the hospital.

== Casualties ==
Thirty-one people died in the riot, most of whom were burnt to death. Among the dead was an 18-month-old who was living at the prison. A further 37 inmates were seriously injured with burns over 60-90% of their bodies, and 256 were evacuated. It was the deadliest prison riot in Bolivian history. President Evo Morales ordered an investigation as relatives waited outside the prison to learn if loved ones were injured or killed. They angrily complained that guards had made no effort to save inmate lives, instead letting the injured die from their burns. The children living at the prison were evacuated after the fire. A list of the deceased had not been released as of August 24. More than 50 prisoners suspected as aggressors during the riot have been isolated pending questioning.

== Cause ==
The riot reportedly started as a battle over leadership and control of the "Chonchocorito" sector of the prison. The gang in cell block A had allegedly been extracting payments from their rivals in cell block B who grew sick of the extortion attempts and started the riot. The suspected ringleaders were convicted murderers and rapists.

== Reaction and aftermath ==
The archbishop of Santa Cruz, Sergio Gualberti, said the riot highlights "the overcrowding that exists within Palmasola and much of the country" due to "breach of duty" on the part of the judicial system causing long delays before trial. He said inmates are "practically forgotten" by the judicial system with no attempts at rehabilitation and criticized the prisons' failure to separate violent and non-violent offenders from each other. Worst of all, he said, was the subjection of children to prison conditions. He said the church was willing to provide financial support to put an end to the practice. The Ombudsman agreed, saying the incident "clearly shows the weakness in prison security, the crisis caused by overcrowding and delayed justice, insecurity within the facilities, and the inadequate prison infrastructure." A representative for the National Convergence political party accused the government of negligence saying the presence of alcohol, weapons, and phones within the prison was strong evidence that authorities had no control of internal security within the prison.

== See also ==
- List of massacres in Bolivia
