= María Barzola =

Bolivian miner and activist

- Born: Llalagua
- Died: 21 December 1942; Catavi Mine
- Occupation: Miner
- Movement: Catavi Mine Workers Union

María Barzola was a Bolivian miner and trade unionist. She is best known for her death during the Catavi Massacre, a 1942 confrontation between tin miners and the army. Barzola grabbed a Bolivian flag, and then was killed by the soldiers' bullets.

== Personal and working life ==
Maria Barzola was a palliri, or rock- breaker. This was a name derived from the Aymara language that was given to female mine-workers who sorted through the rocks pulled up from mines. Many of them came from indigenous backgrounds. Palliris lived a difficult life, described by Gregorio Iriarte as "slaves in modern times, without a man to defend them nor a law to protect them." There are varying accounts told of her involvement in the Catavi incident, but the most credible state that she was a representative for women in the union. She was also a mother.

== Legacy and recognition ==
A female wing of the Bolivian NMR, or Revolutionary Nationalist Movement, are named 'Barzolas' in honor of María Barzola. Lidia Gueiler, the president of Bolivia from 1979 to 1980, was a former member of this group.

A plaza in Potosi is named after her.
