= Christmas Massacre (Bolivia) =

1996 event in Bolivia

The Christmas Massacre, known in Spanish as Masacre de Navidad, was a December 1996 event in Potosí Department, Bolivia that caused the death of eleven people.

A labour dispute between miners and North American mine owners precipitated the arrival of 3,000 police and military. Clashes occurring from December 19 to December 21 lead to the death of ten protestors and one military officer.

== Background ==
On March 15, 1996, two gold mines in the towns of Amayapampa and Capasirca were sold by the Yaksic and Garafulic families to Da Capo Resources of Canada. Until that time, the families had enjoyed a collaborative working relationship with the mine's workers. In July, Da Capo Resources struck an agreement with U.S. company Grange. The new owners made promises to the mine's workers around technological advancement and job security, however the miners at Capa Circa robbed most of the gold being produced from Capa Circa, attempt to stop the stealing were met by death threats to the Bolivian managers which forced Grange to abandon Capacira. Tensions between workers and owners escalated through November and December.

In response to theft allegations, the mine owners brought 150 police officers to the mines and also evicted farmers from the surrounding areas. Miners forcibly disarmed the police on November 14 and seized 150 rifles from the army, before taking over the mine, evicting leadership and police.

The workers held a meeting on December 19, at which demands were made to evict police and foreign owners of mines, protect natural resources, to update the labour laws and to appoint a commission to oversee and protect mining technology until the dispute was resolved.

== Massacre ==
In response to the demands and the mine's takeover, and under direction of the government of Gonzalo Sánchez de Lozada, over 3,000 military and police were mobilised to evict the protestors. The responding force included 1,000 members of the Grupo Especial de Seguridad (English: Special Security Group), the Unidad Polivalentes Antimotines (Multipurpose Anti-Riot Unit) and UMOPAR. It also included 2,000 military personnel drawn from four units under the command of General David Saavedra. The combined force killed four and injured nineteen protestors on December 19.

On December 20, fighting between the protestors and the government troops continued and resulted in the deaths of two protestors and Colonel Eduardo Rivas from the army. On December 21, two more people were killed and one previously injured protestor died.

== Aftermath ==
Ownership of the mine transferred to the Singaporean company Lion Gold subsidiary Minera Nueva Vista SA in 2012. The company later abandoned the mine with wages owed to workers before the mine became.

As of 2016, nobody has been prosecuted for the massacre. In December 2018, miners commemorated the event with a ceremony that included giving gold bars to Bolivian authorities.

== See also ==
- Catavi massacre
- San Juan massacre
- List of massacres in Bolivia
