= All Saints' Massacre =

Massacres in Bolivia

- Native name: Masacre de Todos Santos
- Date: November 1, 1979
- Location: La Paz, Bolivia
- Type: Violent crackdown
- Organised by: Alberto Natusch Busch
- Outcome: Central Obrera Boliviana (COB) trade union confederation launched a campaign of mass protests
- Deaths: 100
- Injuries: 204
- Missing: 20

The All Saints' massacre (Spanish: Masacre de Todos Santos) is the name given to the violent crackdown against popular protests by the military regime of Alberto Natusch Busch that seized power in a coup on November 1 (All Saints' Day), 1979. In response to the November 1 coup, the Central Obrera Boliviana (COB) trade union confederation launched a campaign of mass protests, which the military violently suppressed.

The week after the coup, on November 5–6, 1979, Natusch Busch gave orders to intensify the crackdown. The soldiers of colonel Doria Medina were allowed to act without control in La Paz. Riot control vehicles were sent out into various parts of the city. A helicopter, rented from the U.S. company Groves Limited, was used to shoot down protestors. However, these measures did not prevent the continuation of mass protests. La Paz residents took to the streets, pelting rocks against the armed forces and constructed barricades.

More than 100 people were killed, 204 injured and 20 'disappeared' during the brief existence of the Natusch Busch regime (Dunkerley states that more than 200 were killed, and 125 'disappeared'). The majority of the victims were killed during the days of November 5 and 6, and almost all of them in the city of La Paz. The number of deaths of the two-week-long rule of Natusch Busch is comparable to the seven years of military rule under Hugo Banzer.

Sixteen days after the beginning of the coup, the military regime stepped down as a result of the popular protests. As of 2008, the perpetrators of the killings have not been brought to justice.
