= Víctor Montoya =

Bolivian writer

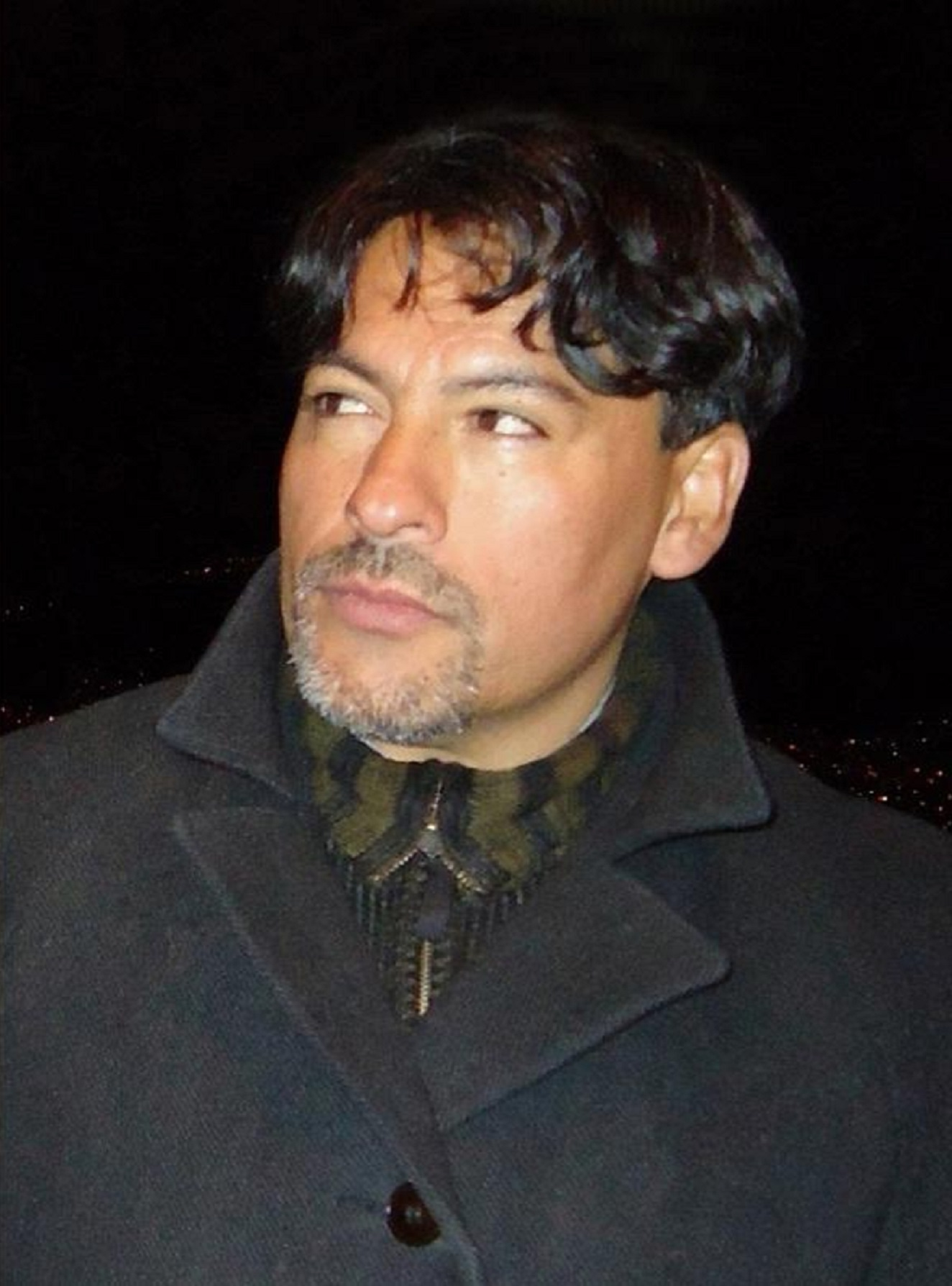
- Born: 21 June 1958 (age 67) La Paz, Bolivia
- Occupation: Writer, journalist, pedagogue
- Language: Spanish
- Genre: Novel, short story, essay

Víctor Montoya (born June 21, 1958) is a Bolivian writer, cultural journalist, and pedagogue. Imprisoned by the dictatorship in his native Bolivia, he became an exile following a campaign by Amnesty International in 1977.

== Biography ==
Born in La Paz on June 21, 1958. From early childhood he lived in the mining towns of Siglo XX and Llallagua, in northern Potosí department. There, the miserable conditions of the miners led him to identify with and join their efforts to change those conditions. At the age of 9 he witnessed the Massacre of San Juan.

In 1976, as a result of his political activities, he was persecuted, tortured, and jailed by the military dictatorship of Hugo Banzer Suárez. While imprisoned in the San Pedro Prison and in the top-security jail of Chonchocoro-Viacha, he wrote his first published book, the eyewitness account Strike and Repression.

Freed from prison through a campaign of Amnesty International, he arrived in Sweden as an exile in 1977. He graduated from the Stockholm Institute of Education, in whose Pedagogic Institute he took specialized courses. He taught classes on the Quechua language, coordinated cultural projects in a library, led literature workshops, and worked as a teacher for several years.

He was director of the literary magazines PuertAbierta and Contraluz. His work won him awards and literary scholarships. His stories have been translated and published in international anthologies. Currently, he writes for publications in Latin America, Europe, and the United States. He is caretaker of the digital anthology of Latin American Storytellers in Sweden.

== Bibliography ==
- Huelga y represión [Strike and Repression] (1979)
- Días y noches de angustia [Days and Nights of Anguish] (1982)
- Cuentos Violentos [Violent Stories] (1991)
- El laberinto del pecado [The Labyrinth of Sin] (1993)
- El eco de la conciencia [The Echo of Conscience] (1994)
- Antología del cuento latinoamericano en Suecia [Anthology of the Latin American Short Story in Sweden] (1995)
- Palabra encendida [Word on Fire] (1996)
- El niño en el cuento boliviano [The Child in the Bolivian Short Story] (1999)
- Cuentos de la mina [Stories from the Mine] (2000)
- Entre tumbas y pesadillas [Between Tombs and Nightmares] (2002)
- Fugas y socavones [Escapes and Underground Tunnels] (2002)
- Literatura infantil: Lenguaje y fantasía [Children’s Literature: Language and Fantasy] (2003)
- Poesía boliviana en Suecia [Bolivian Poetry in Sweden] (2005)
- Retratos [Portraits] (2006)
- Cuentos en el exilio [Stories in Exile] (2008)
- Conversaciones con el Tío de Potosí [Conversations with the Tio of Potosi] (2013)
