= Siglo XX mine =

Tin mine in Bolivia

Coordinates: 18°25′S 66°38′W

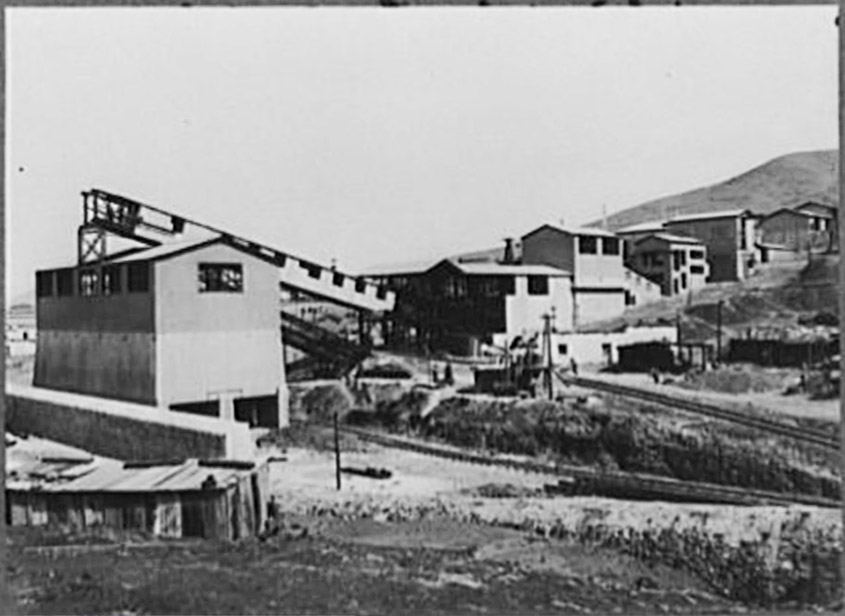
Siglo XX mine, early 1940s

Siglo XX (Spanish for "Twentieth Century") is a tin mine in Bolivia. It is located in the city of Llallagua in the province of Bustillos, Potosí Department. Along with the Catavi mine, it is part of a mining complex in the area.

It was acquired in the 1910s by Simón Iturri Patiño, who was dubbed the "King of Tin." It was the site of continual labor strife, and many of its workers were active in the Union Federation of Bolivian Mine Workers (FSTMB).

The mine was nationalized following the Bolivian National Revolution of 1952, when the Revolutionary Nationalist Movement (MNR) and its allies overthrew the military junta. Siglo XX and other mines were placed under the control of a new state agency, the Corporación Minera de Bolivia (COMIBOL). The Catavi-Siglo XX complex became the largest component of COMIBOL.

On 24 June 1967, government troops under the orders of President René Barrientos and a new military junta marched on the mine and committed the worst massacre of workers in Bolivian history. One witness and subsequent exile, Víctor Montoya, put the casualties at twenty killed and seventy wounded. The incident was the basis for filmmaker Jorge Sanjinés's 1971 drama The Courage of the People.

In 1987, as part of an economic restructuring deal with the IMF and the World Bank, the government shut down production at Siglo XX. Mining operations are currently undertaken by members of several large cooperatives who work independently or in small groups.

== Sources ==
- Jordán Pozo, Rolando: Minería. Siglo XX: la era del estaño; in: Campero Prudencio, Fernando: Bolivia en el siglo XX. La formación de la Bolivia Contemporánea, La Paz: Harvard club de Bolivia 1999, S. 219-239
