= Thesis of Pulacayo =

Topic in Latin American labor movement

The Thesis of Pulacayo (Tesis de Pulacayo) was an important document in the Bolivian and Latin American labor movement. It was adopted at the request of the delegation of Llallagua in the Congreso de la Federación Sindical de Trabajadores Mineros de Bolivia (FSTMB), which met in November 1946 in the city of Pulacayo. The thesis is based on the Trotskyist conception of permanent revolution and on the Transitional Program of the Fourth International.
