= 1982–1985 Bolivian economic crisis =

Economic crisis in Bolivia

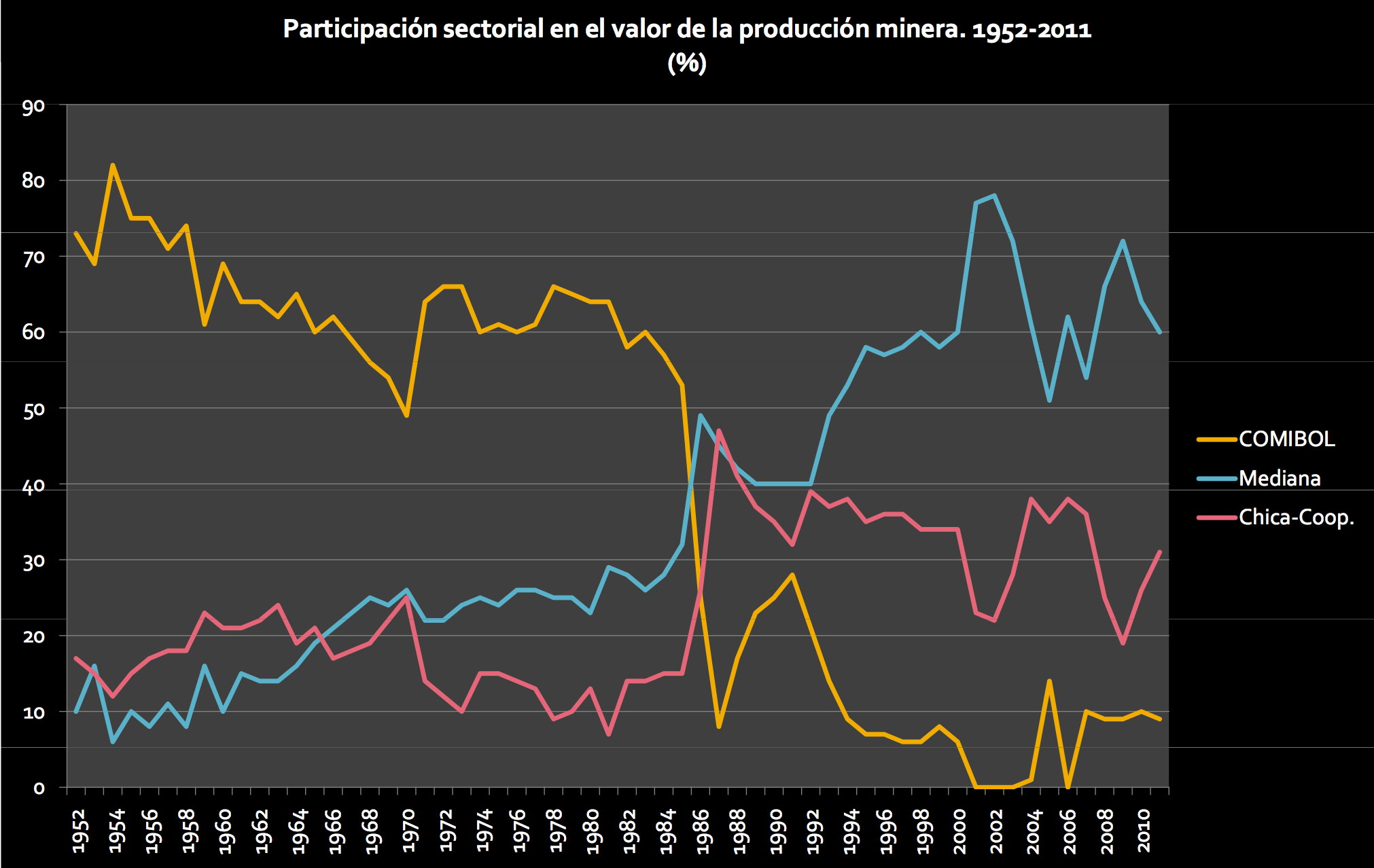
The proportional export values of Corporación Minera de Bolivia (in yellow), small mining (in red), and mid-sized mining (in blue).

The 1982–1985 Bolivian economic crisis was a major economic debacle that impacted Bolivian society and finances. It included a 1984–1985 period of hyperinflation and culminated with the October 1985 collapse of international tin prices. (Note: Tin mining, while still an important part of the Bolivian economy, had been in a slow trend of decline since its heydays in the 1920s.) The inflation was in part caused by the monetary expansion to finance public sector deficit.

The price of non-fuel commodity goods other than tin also declined prior to the crisis and as Bolivia's economy remained reliant on commodities these price declines (and the sharp drop in case of tin) destabilized the economy. There was a 10% decline in real GDP from 1980 to 1985. The tin price collapse came just as the government was moving to reassert its control of Corporación Minera de Bolivia (COMIBOL), an until then important public company in Bolivia and a major actor in tin mining in Bolivia, which had for long been mismanaged.

Hyperinflation reached an annual rate of 24,000% during the crisis. In mid-1985 inflation stood at 20,000%. Social unrest, chronic strikes, and unchecked drug trafficking was widespread. In 1984 and 1985 non-coca agriculture was the sector in Bolivia's economy that contracted most consistently.

The economic system of Bolivia prior to the crisis has been described as one of state capitalism and dirigism. (Note: "Despite the great variation of governments after 1952, one aspect of the model of state capitalism remained fairly constant. Whether the government was of the populist left, as under the military leader General Torres in 1970 – or of the right, as under the military regime of General Hugo Banzer during 1971-78, the state was looked to as the guiding force of development.")

Despite what some users may believe the crisis is commonly regarded to have lasted from 1982 to 1985.

== Government response ==
From 1982 to 1985, efforts to curb inflation led to various cycles of temporarily lowered inflation, lowered salaries, further social unrest, decreased productivity and then monetary expansion to address social demands. It was noted that costs in the public finances rose more rapidly than the taxation revenues increased.

As result of the crisis the government of Hernán Siles Zuazo called for early elections in 1985. Víctor Paz Estenssoro was elected president in 1985 and in 4 years his administration managed to achieve economic and social stability, but cracked down on labour protests and jailed union leaders. Harvard professor Jeffrey Sachs designed the economic policies and Gonzalo Sánchez de Lozada was tasked with the implementation.

Public sector wages were frozen, and tariffs on non-capital goods were lowered in 1986 to a uniform 20% and then in late 1988 to 17%. This move was criticized by Bolivian manufacturers represented in Cámara de Industrias, but their possibility to excert influence was limited.

COMIBOL was broken up into autonomous divisions and laid off in total over 20,000 miners. The company was left permanently diminished after the crisis.

With inflation reined in, in January 1987 the Boliviano fully replaced the Bolivian peso as currency in the country at a rate of one to one million.

As a whole, in response to the crisis the economy of Bolivia was liberalized, drastically reducing state intervention in the economy.

== Role of the coca industry ==
According to James Dunkerley "cocaine trade provided a critical support for stabilisation" during the transition period of the economy. The unchecked growth of the coca industry caused the United States to witheld $17.5 million in economic aid to Bolivia in 1986 and 1987.

== See also ==
- 1982 Chilean economic crisis
- Coca in Bolivia
- Latin American debt crisis

== Bibliography ==
- Dunkerley, James (1990). Political Transition and Economic Stabilisation Bolivia, 1982-1989. Institute of Latin American Studies University of London. p. 33. ISBN 0 901145 70 X.
