= Ucureña =

- Town
- Location within Bolivia
- Coordinates: 17°35′S 65°54′W
- Country: Bolivia
- Department: Cochabamba Department
- Province: Germán Jordán Province
- Municipality: Cliza Municipality

Population (2001)
  - Total: 2,306
- Time zone: UTC-4 (BOT)

Ucureña is a small town in Bolivia.
