= René Barrientos =

President of Bolivia (1964–1966, 1966–1969)

General René Barrientos
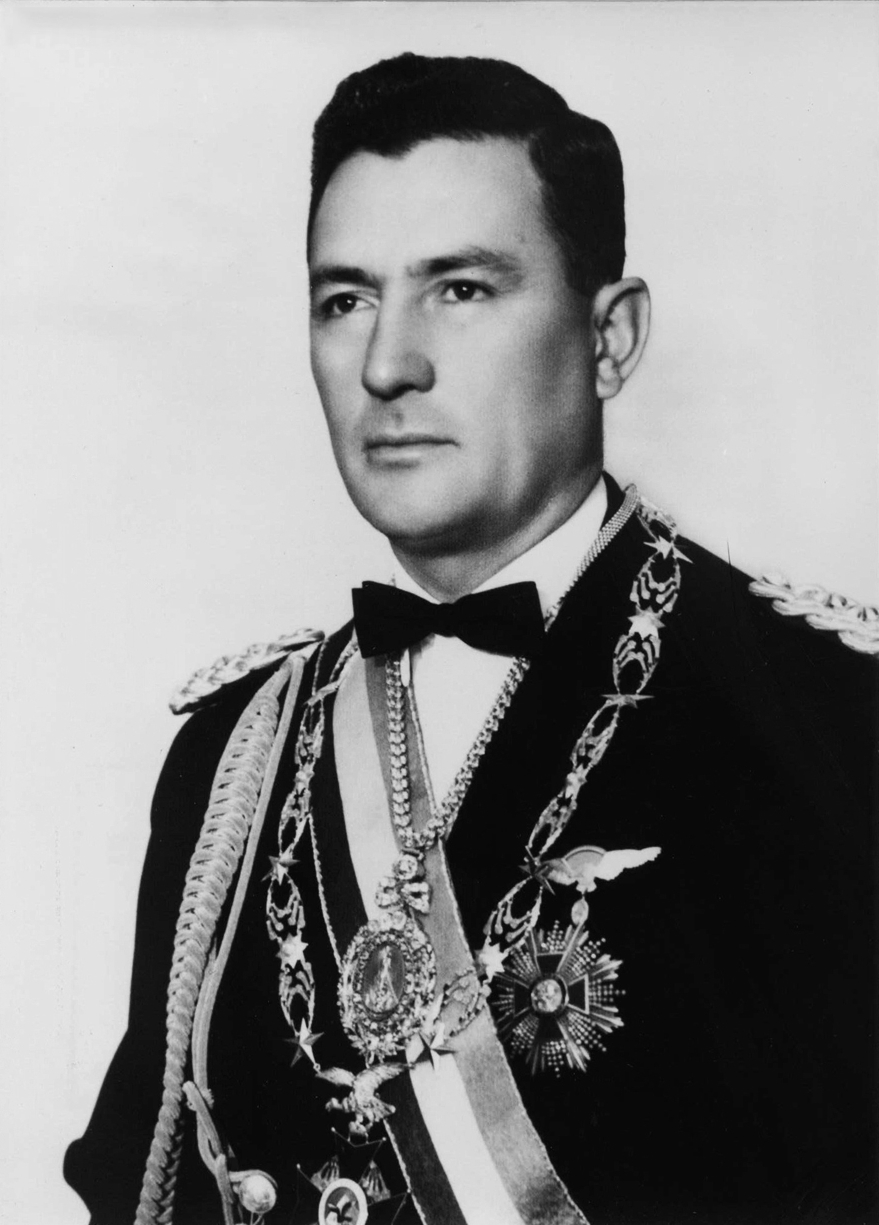
- Official portrait, 1967

47th President of Bolivia
- In office 6 August 1966 – 27 April 1969
- Vice President: Luis Adolfo Siles
- Preceded by: Alfredo Ovando
- Succeeded by: Luis Adolfo Siles
- In office 5 November 1964 – 2 January 1966 (Note: Co-president: 26 May 1965 – 2 January 1966.)
- Vice President: Vacant
- Preceded by: Víctor Paz Estenssoro
- Succeeded by: Alfredo Ovando

30th Vice President of Bolivia
- In office 6 August 1964 – 4 November 1964
- President: Víctor Paz Estenssoro
- Preceded by: Juan Lechín
- Succeeded by: Luis Adolfo Siles (1966)

Personal details
- Born: René Emilio Barrientos Ortuño; 30 May 1919 Tarata, Cochabamba, Bolivia
- Died: 27 April 1969 (aged 49) Arque, Cochabamba, Bolivia
- Cause of death: Helicopter crash
- Resting place: Cochabamba, Bolivia
- Party: Popular Christian Movement (1966–1969)
- Other political affiliations: Revolutionary Nationalist Movement (until 1964)
- Parents: Antonio Barrientos; Ercilia Ortuño
- Education: Military College of the Army; Military College of Aviation

Military service
- Allegiance: Bolivia
- Branch/service: Bolivian Air Force
- Years of service: 1938–1964
- Rank: General
- Awards: Order of the Condor of the Andes

René Emilio Barrientos Ortuño (30 May 1919 – 27 April 1969) was a Bolivian military officer and politician who served as the 47th president of Bolivia from 1964 to 1965 and 1966 to 1969. During his first term, he shared power with Alfredo Ovando as co-president of a military junta and was the 30th vice president of Bolivia in 1964.

General Barrientos came to power after the 1964 Bolivian coup d'état which overthrew the government of President Victor Paz Estenssoro. During his three-year rule, Barrientos and the army suppressed leftist opposition to his regime, including a guerrilla group led by Che Guevara in 1967.

On 27 April 1969, Barrientos was killed in a helicopter crash near Arque, Bolivia. He may have been assassinated, but that has not been conclusively proven.

== Early years ==
Barrientos was a native of Tarata, department of Cochabamba. His father was of Spanish ancestry while his mother was Quechua. After his father died when he was a child, Barrientos was sent to a Franciscan orphanage. He left the orphanage at 12 and attended a private high school while working odd jobs to pay the tuition. After graduating, he entered the military academy in La Paz. He was a career military officer, graduating from the military academy in 1943 and earning his pilot's license in 1945. Later in the 1940s, he gravitated toward the reformist Revolutionary Nationalist Movement (Movimiento Nacionalista Revolucionario, or MNR) party of Víctor Paz Estenssoro. Barrientos played a part in the Bolivian National Revolution of 1952, when the MNR toppled the established order and took power. In fact, he was given the task of flying out of the country to bring back the revolutionary leader Víctor Paz Estenssoro, then in exile, once the rebellion succeeded. In 1957, Barrientos was rewarded when he was named commander of the Bolivian Air Force.

== A new kind of general ==
Known as a rather obsequious, sycophantic supporter of the MNR, he slowly became famous throughout the country for his uncommon, and very public, feats of valor. In 1960, for example, a live parachute jump demonstration by Bolivian Air Force soldiers ended in disaster when their equipment failed and 3 of the 15 parachutists fell to their death before a large crowd assembled to view the event. Recriminations flew as to who should be held responsible for the carnage. Barrientos, as Air Force commander, decided to put on a demonstration of his own, and jumped from an airplane himself using one of the parachutes that had failed to open during the earlier debacle. His point was that there had been nothing wrong with the equipment or the training, simply bad luck; this incident cemented his popularity among certain sections of the population. Furthermore, the ruling MNR helped prop up his standing, as the MNR leadership constantly extolled General Barrientos' virtues, portraying him as a paragon of the new kind of military officer the revolution had fostered.

By the early 1960s, while the ruling MNR party had begun to fall apart due to personal and policy differences between its leading members, Barrientos' stock was clearly on the rise. In addition, President Paz Estenssoro (elected to a second term in 1960) was leaning more heavily on military support to restore order to various parts of the country where rival pro-MNR militias had turned against each other, often on behalf of specific MNR leaders. Disarming the militias (who had been allowed to keep their weapons since the 1952 Revolution) became a priority to Paz, and this enhanced the role the new armed forces played in the national arena. The most popular of these military leaders was, of course, the dashing Barrientos.

== Rise to power ==
In 1961, Paz Estenssoro had the Bolivian Constitution amended in order to be allowed to run for consecutive re-election, feeling that only he had the standing to keep the crumbling MNR together. Traditionally, attempts such as these (known as "prorroguismo") have been strongly condemned by the Bolivian political elites, many of whose members may have been waiting for their turn to occupy the Presidential palace for years. This was no exception, and Paz's controversial move would soon prove harmful to him. Paz, surprisingly to some, chose General Barrientos as his running mate in that year's elections, and the two were sworn in on 6 August 1964. Just three months later, Barrientos — in tandem with the Army Commander Alfredo Ovando — toppled Paz in a violent coup d'état and installed himself as co-president in a Junta alongside General Ovando.

His idea all along was to capitalize on his popularity and run for elections, with the full support of the Bolivian military establishment now in control of the country. To this end, he resigned his co-presidency in early 1966 and registered himself as a candidate for president in the general elections that were held in July 1966. With the most important civilian leaders (Paz, Hernán Siles and Juan Lechín) in exile, Barrientos was easily elected, and was sworn in during August 1966.

== Barrientos as constitutional president ==
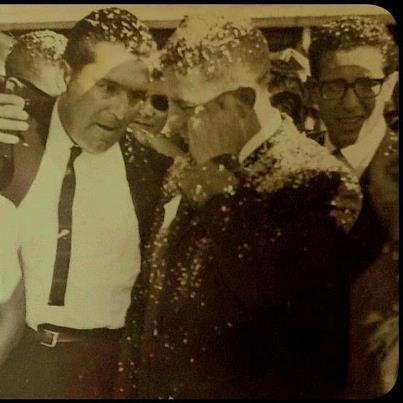
René Barrientos and Don Rupert Herboso at the 1966 opening celebration of Mercado Fidel Aranibar in Cochabamba, Bolivia. Presidente Barrientos came to oversee Herboso's mall opening three years before his death.

General Barrientos was quite charismatic, and was throughout his presidency popular with ordinary Bolivians, aided by the fluency with which he spoke Quechua, the most important native language among the Bolivian peasantry.

Barrientos was skilled at manipulating the masses with his oratory, which often allowed him to present himself as both a populist and conservative, a revolutionary and a "law-and-order" advocate. Purporting to be a staunch Christian, Barrientos actively courted the church, and in fact, chose as his running mate in the 1966 elections the leader of the small Christian Democrat Party of Bolivia, Dr. Luis Adolfo Siles. He was fiercely anti-communist and pro-free market. Accepting more military aid and acquiescing to the training of special forces designed to combat possible communist-inspired insurgencies (under the aegis of the Alliance for Progress) made Barrientos particularly popular with Washington.

== The 1967 guerrilla insurgency ==
Barrientos had ample opportunity to prove his anti-Communist credentials in 1967, when a guerrilla force was discovered to be operating in the Bolivian southeast under the leadership of the Argentine-Cuban revolutionary Ernesto "Che" Guevara in the Bolivian jungle. Barrientos was very concerned with Guevara's alleged popularity among the miners in the southwestern part of the country, and clamped down in the area with some very heavy-handed measures (such as the San Juan massacre). Guevara felt that such an atrocity by the Bolivian Army and Air Force would be the tipping point in his favour in rallying the miners to his communist cause, but eventually the miners signed an agreement with the government-owned mining company Siglo XX, which agreement Guevara felt undermined his reason for being there. The war between the national forces under President Barrientos and Che Guevara's militia did not end there, but eventually the Bolivian Army Rangers captured Guevara and executed him in October 1967. Barrientos had directly ordered Guevara's execution after his capture.

== Political troubles and Barrientos' death ==
While temporarily enhancing the president's stature, this only started more troubles for Barrientos. While the army was fighting the guerrillas, the miners of Siglo XX (a state-owned Bolivian mining town) declared themselves in support of the insurgency, prompting the president to send troops to regain control. This led to the San Juan massacre, when soldiers opened fire on the miners and killed around 30 men and women on Saint John's Day, called Día de San Juan in Spanish, 24 June 1967. Further, a major scandal erupted in 1968 when Barrientos' trusted friend and Minister of Interior, Antonio Arguedas, disappeared with the captured diary of Che Guevara, which soon surfaced in, of all places, Havana. From abroad, Arguedas confessed himself to have been a clandestine Marxist supporter, denouncing Barrientos and many of his aides as being on the CIA's payroll. The episode embarrassed the administration and cast doubts about the president's judgment (after all, it was he who was friends with, and had appointed, Arguedas to the most important ministry post in the government).

In the aftermath of the mining massacres and anti-guerrilla campaign, Barrientos was seen by some as a brutal dictator at the service of foreign interests while masquerading as a democrat. Eager to do some damage control and repair his once-excellent relations with the campesinos (Bolivian farm workers), the president took to traveling throughout the country to present his position, even to the smallest and remotest of Bolivian villages. It was a tactic that had yielded him good results in the past and Barrientos hoped to rebuild his political capital. However, on 27 April 1969, a Hiller OH-23 helicopter of the Bolivian Air Force (nicknamed Holofernes) that was carrying him struck telephone cables near Arque, killing Barrientos, his aide-de-camp and the pilot. An assassination has been considered a possibility but never proven.

== Notes ==
Military offices
| Preceded by Javier Cerruto | Commander General of the Bolivian Air Force; 1960–1964 | Succeeded by Jorge Belmonte |
Political offices
| Preceded by Juan Lechín | Vice President of Bolivia; 1964 | Succeeded by Luis Adolfo Siles |
| Preceded by Víctor Paz Estenssoro | President of Bolivia; 1964–1966 | Succeeded by Alfredo Ovando |
| Preceded by Alfredo Ovando | President of Bolivia; 1966–1969 | Succeeded by Luis Adolfo Siles |
