= Catavi mine =

Tin mine in Bustillos, Bolivia

Coordinates: 18°25′00″S 66°38′00″W

Catavi is a tin mine in Bolivia, near the city of Llallagua in the province of Bustillos, Potosí Department. Along with the Siglo XX mine, it is part of a mining complex in the area.

Apart from the Catavi-Siglo XX mining complex, it refers also to a residential area, to a mill processing ore, and to an administrative office of the Corporación Minera de Bolivia (COMIBOL).

== History ==
The tin mine was acquired in the 1900s by Simón Iturri Patiño, who was dubbed the "King of Tin." It was the site of continual labor strife, and many of its workers were active in the Union Federation of Bolivian Mine Workers (FSTMB). The mining camp kept the largely indigenous workforce in rigidly segregated conditions, away from the American managerial staff; housing, water supplies, shops, transport, entertainment, and bathrooms were all segregated. This division in daily life contributed to a climate of tension between Bolivian workers and foreign management.

During a labor dispute between miners and management in December 1942, the striking miners at Patiño's Catavi mine were massacred by government troops in the Catavi Massacre. The mine was nationalized following the "Bolivian National Revolution" of 1952, when the Revolutionary Nationalist Movement (MNR) and its allies overthrew the military junta. Catavi and other mines were placed under the control of a new state agency, the Corporación Minera de Bolivia (COMIBOL). The Catavi-Siglo XX complex became the largest component of COMIBOL, employing some 5,000 workers.

On June 24, 1967, government troops under the orders of General René Barrientos and a new military junta marched on the mine and committed the largest massacre of workers in Bolivian history. The massacre occurred on St John the Baptist's Day, an indigenous winter solstice holiday, hence it became known as the San Juan Massacre.

Over the following decades, the tin deposits in the mine became exhausted. In 1987, as part of an economic restructuring deal with the IMF and World Bank, the government shut down production at Catavi.
