= Catavi massacre =

1942 massacre of striking miners in Bolivia

The Catavi massacre was a massacre of striking miners by Bolivian government forces at the Catavi mine on 21 December 1942. According to the official report, 19 miners were killed and 400 wounded, while estimates by the workers themselves reported up to 400 deaths.

== Background ==
The workers' movement made some nominal political gains in the late 1930s as a result of the political shift after the Chaco War of 1932–1935. Left-wing political parties took the place of some of the traditional conservative forces in the Bolivian Congress, but the government of President Enrique Peñaranda continued to adhere to conservative policies.

A law establishing the right to collective bargaining had been passed by the Germán Busch government, but the government's perceived shift on labor issues remained untested until the 1942 miners' strike. Bolivia had formally entered World War II on the side of the Allied Powers after the Japanese attack on Pearl Harbor in December 1941, and the Peñaranda government held that wartime strikes represented an unacceptable disruption of Bolivian production for the United States.

Workers at the Catavi mine lived in deplorable conditions, with families living in company huts without running water or toilets, with multiple families in a single room. Access to health care and education was limited.

== Massacre ==
When Siglo XX and Catavi mine workers presented a petition demanding a 100% increase in wages in 1942, management refused to negotiate and the miners' union leaders called for a strike. The government then arrested all union officials and killed seven miners protesting the arrest of the union officials. In response, 7,000 miners went on a five-day strike from 15 December 1942 to 20 December 1942. When the mine workers proceeded to march toward management offices on 21 December 1942, the Bolivian military surrounded the crowd and fired for six hours.

The official report was that there were 19 deaths and 400 wounded, while estimates by the workers themselves reported up to 400 deaths.

== Aftermath ==
The massacre resulted in an open rupture in the already deteriorating relations between Peñaranda and the moderate and radical reform parties within the Bolivian Congress. The Congress initiated a censure motion after the Catavi Massacre. The motion failed by a single vote. One notable victim was María Barzola, who was later celebrated as a martyr to the cause.
