= Bolivian Workers' Center =

Trade union federation in Bolivia

COB
- Bolivian Workers' Union
- Central Obrera Boliviana
- Founded: 1952
- Merger of: Local Workers' Federation; Trade Union Confederation of Bolivian Workers; Bolivian Confederation of Workers
- Headquarters: La Paz, Bolivia
- Location: Bolivia
- Affiliations: WFTU

The Bolivian Workers' Center (Spanish: Central Obrera Boliviana, COB) is the chief trade union federation in Bolivia. It represents groups such as industry workers, miners, peasants and professionals, its main objective is "achieving the emancipation of workers in Bolivia, in the defense of their fundamental rights, for the definite liberation of the exploited, oppressed, marginalized and the Bolivian People".

It was founded in 1952 following the national revolution that brought the Revolutionary Nationalist Movement to power. The most important affiliate of the COB was the Union Federation of Bolivian Mine Workers (FSTMB). From 1952 to 1987, the COB was led by Juan Lechín, who was also head of the FSTMB. In its heyday it was arguably the strongest independent labour movement in the world.

The COB has had a difficult relationship with every Bolivian president since the 1950s because of its confrontational nature. More recently, it played a significant role in the series of demonstrations that brought down President Carlos Mesa in 2005. The COB currently supports nationalization of Bolivian natural gas reserves and opposed water privatization during the 2000 Cochabamba protests. In 2010 it led a brief national march that led to pension reform and in April 2011, it organized a twelve-day general strike for higher wages. It led protests in 2025 against austerity measures proposed by president Rodrigo Paz..

The COB represents about two million Bolivian workers, bringing together workers from various branches of industry and public services as well as consultation with many peasants' and indigenous leaders, such as Felipe Quispe.

== Structure and leadership ==
The COB is led by a National Executive Committee, which is regularly elected in Ordinary Congresses of the organization, which are held every few years. The leading figure is the Executive Secretary, followed by the General Secretary. Other members of the National Executive Committee are also named secretaries, each with a designated area of responsibility. Leadership rank within the National Executive Committee has long been allocated by assessing the sector's power and militancy. Since this Fifth Congress, this has been based on: union density (the percentage of workers in the sector who are unionized); degree of emancipation from private property, through nationalization or cooperatives; and history of combativeness, revolutionary tradition, political consciousness, and solidarity with other sectors. In practice, the Executive Secretary has always been from Bolivia's mining sector.

The current Executive Secretary of the COB is Juan Carlos Huarachi, a miners' union leader in Huanuni, Oruro, who was elected at the XVII National Congress, held in Santa Cruz de la Sierra, in February 2018. Prior executive secretaries include:

| Executive Secretary | Affiliation | Elected at | Held in | Term began |
|---|---|---|---|---|
| Saturnino Mallku | Miner | XIII Ordinary Congress | Sucre | March 2002 |
| Pedro Montes | Sindicato Mixto de Trabajadores Mineros de Huanuni | XIV Ordinary Congress | | 2006 |
| Juan Carlos Trujillo | Sindicato Mixto de Trabajadores Mineros de Huanuni | XV Ordinary Congress | Tarija | January 2012 |
| Guido Mitma | Sindicato Mixto de Trabajadores Mineros de Huanuni | XVI Ordinary Congress | Tupiza | January 2016 |
| Juan Carlos Huarachi | Sindicato Mixto de Trabajadores Mineros de Huanuni | XVII Ordinary Congress | Santa Cruz | February 2018 |

While the National Executive Committee represents the COB, its powers are subordinate to National Congresses (Ordinary and Extraordinary gatherings of member unions) and to National Ampliados (smaller gatherings of union representatives).

The unions that are part of the COB are affiliated into Federations (typically representing a single sector, such as factory workers or peasants, within one of Bolivia's departments), which are grouped into (usually national) Confederations by sector.
