= Mining Corporation of Bolivia =

Bolivian mining corporation

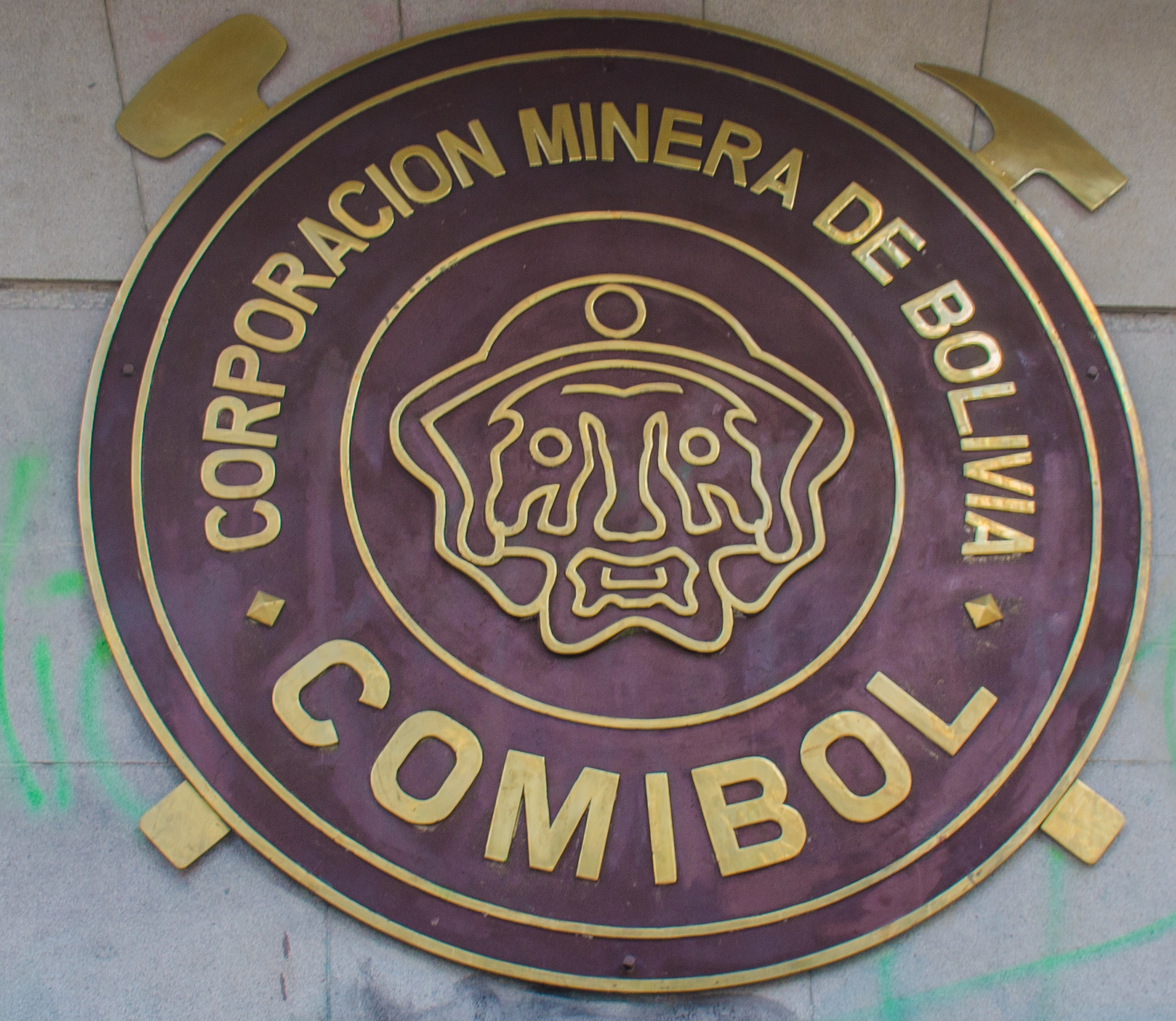
Emblem at the COMIBOL Building in La Paz

The Mining Corporation of Bolivia (Spanish: Corporación Minera de Bolivia; COMIBOL) is a state-owned enterprise of Bolivia that manages national mining operations. Established on October 2, 1952, it became the largest and most important state company in the decades after the Bolivian National Revolution. It suffered a period of inactivity following the 1982–1985 Bolivian economic crisis but was reactivated in 2006 and today holds an important, if diminished, role in the national economy.

== History ==
COMIBOL was created by Supreme Declaration 3196 on October 2, 1952.

It was founded ahead of the nationalization of the Patiño, Hochschild, and Aramayo mines on October 31 by the government of Víctor Paz Estenssoro, in the context of the Bolivian National Revolution. The businesses of the three nationalized mining groups were initially reorganized into 16 mining companies exploiting tin, lead, silver, zinc, tungsten, copper, and gold, with COMIBOL overseeing the administration of these operations.

COMIBOL was the principal Bolivian public company for many decades after its creation, being the country's main source of foreign currency and its biggest employer. It played an important role in the capitalization of YPFB from the 1950s to '70s. As of November 2014, COMIBOL was the country's third-largest public company based on revenue, after YPFB and the Empresa Metalúrgica de Vinto.

The history of COMIBOL is intimately linked to Bolivia's development process. Its foundations were the transfer to the state of 163 mines owned across 13 companies by the state's mining barons, Patiño, Hochschild, and Aramayo, which had a labor force of 29,000 people and a total production of 27,000 metric tons of tin.

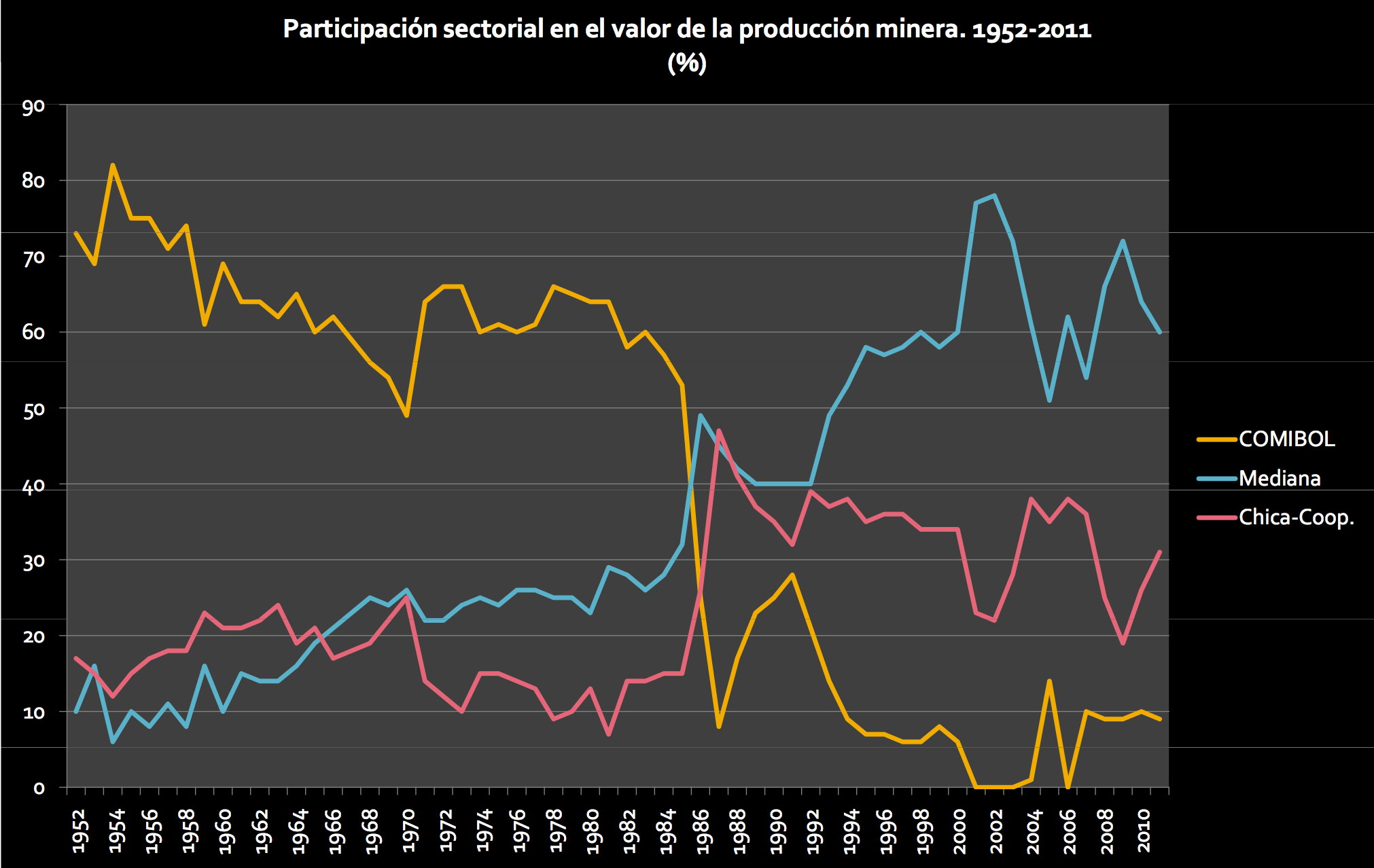
The proportional export values of COMIBOL (in yellow), small mining (in red), and mid-sized mining (in blue).

During the Bolivian National Revolution, from 1952 to 1964, COMIBOL suffered from declining mineral content, a lack of reserves, a lack of administrative capacity, and an excess of workers. At the same time, the government used COMIBOL to generate cheap foreign currency and financial resources. For example, in 1956, COMIBOL contributed 30 million dollars to the Corporación Boliviana de Fomento and 10 million to YPFB. It's estimated that during the government of the Revolutionary Nationalist Movement in this period, COMIBOL transferred more than 100 million dollars to YPFB.

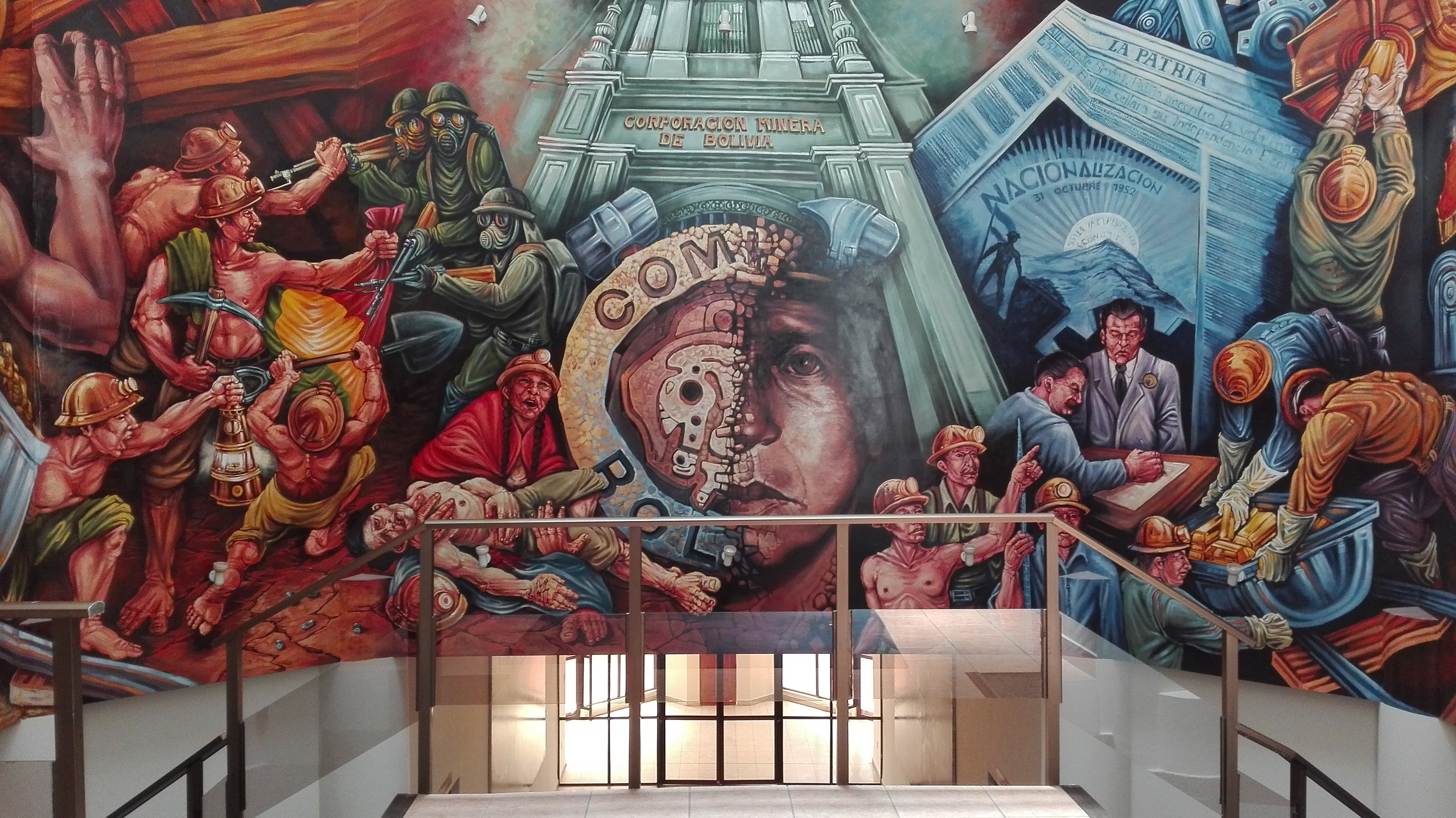
A mural at the COMIBOL archives

The relative importance of COMIBOL's export values was in permanent decline. Since Bolivia's 1985 economic crisis and the institution of Supreme Decree 21060, the value of exports from small and mid-sized mining, as a percentage of the total value of exports, overtook that of COMIBOL. It became effectively paralyzed between 1986 and 2005, with its activities extremely limited.

In 2006, the company was reactivated and resumed its productive capacity, though at a lower level than before 1985.

The COMIBOL archives are housed at the Catavi mine.

== Companies ==
- Empresa Minera Huanuni
- Empresa Minera Colquiri
- Empresa Minera Corocoro
- Empresa Metalúrgica Vinto
- Empresa Metalúrgica de Karachipampa
- Empresa Boliviana del Oro
- Empresa Minera San Jose
- Dirección de Medio Ambiente - DIMA

In 2017, the Gerencia Nacional Recursos Evaporíticos was moved from under COMIBOL and the Ministry of Mining, coming under the purview of the Empresa Pública Nacional Estratégica de Yacimientos de Litio Bolivianos, which depends on the Ministry of Energy.

== Huanuni ==
Due to its high mineral content, Huanuni was the only COMIBOL mine that did not close in 1985, after the tin market crisis and Supreme Decree 21060. It was exploited as a joint venture until 2006, when it was retaken by COMIBOL.

A large part of the technology used in Huanuni is from the 1970s. Owing to the richness of its minerals, it is more mechanized than other mines in Bolivia. The government is constructing a new refinery in Dolores, near Huanuni, that should improve the efficiency and profitability of the Empresa Minera Huanuni. The high price of tin has increased interest in exploitation within the mine. Today, there are around 4,500 workers at Huanuni, including 2,000 on the surface. In 2006, competition over the riches veins almost led to a fight between cooperative miners and those employed by the state. In the end, the government opted to hired the cooperative workers as employees, increasing COMIBOL's payroll.
