= Trade Union Federation of Mineworkers of Bolivia =

FSTMB
- Trade Union Federation of Mineworkers of Bolivia
- Federación Sindical de Trabajadores Mineros de Bolivia
- Founded: June 11, 1944
- Location: Bolivia
- Key people: Miguel Zubieta Miranda, executive secretary
- Website: sites.google.com/site/fstmb2003

The Trade Union Federation of Mineworkers of Bolivia (Spanish: Federación Sindical de Trabajadores Mineros de Bolivia; FSTMB) is a trade union center in Bolivia that represents mineworkers. Bolivia's miners are commonly regarded as the country's most class-conscious workers. The FSTMB has played an important role in Bolivia's recent history.

The union emerged in the wake of a violent clash between government troops and striking tin miners in Oruro and Potosí in 1942. The FSTMB was founded on June 11, 1944 at a congress held in Huanuni, Oruro. The Huanuni Congress included delegates from 25 local unions, the Revolutionary Nationalist Movement (MNR), and the Revolutionary Workers' Party (POR, a Trotskyist group). The newly formed union had a membership of 60,000 miners. Juan Lechín, the leader of the miners' movement and POR member, was chosen as the union's Executive Secretary.

Divisions emerged in the union's leadership over how to relate to the new government of Major Gualberto Villarroel. MNR members wanted the FSTMB to support Major Villarroel, but the Lechín and the other members of the POR wanted the union to remain independent of the government. The MNR's position was defeated in 1946 when the FSTMB adopted the "Pulacayo Thesis," which called for a workers' revolution and other radical goals. In 1947, POR members formed a caucus in the union, the Bloque Parlamentario Minero, to represent their interests. The FSTMB faced renewed government suppression following a series of strikes in 1949, forcing Lechín and other union leaders into exile.

New elections were held in 1951 that gave the MNR a plurality, leading the military to nullify the elections. The FSTMB and POR formed militias of workers that fought on the side of the MNR. These militias fought government forces and stormed army bases. These struggles culminated in the "Bolivian National Revolution" in April 1952, which placed the MNR in control of the government. Following the revolution, the FSTMB became the main component of the Bolivian Workers' Center (COB), a new umbrella organization for all labor unions. Most of the large-scale tin mines were nationalized and placed under the control of a new government agency, the Corporación Minera de Bolivia (COMIBOL). COMIBOL was managed jointly by the government and the FSTMB.

From 1964 to 1982, a series of military dictators ruled Bolivia. The FSTMB and the COB often faced harsh government repression, most notably under the regimes of Colonel Hugo Banzer (1971–78) and General Luis García Meza (1980–81). Many of the union's leaders were jailed or forced into exile during these years. The FSTMB became a leading force in Bolivian politics once again with the restoration of democracy in 1982.

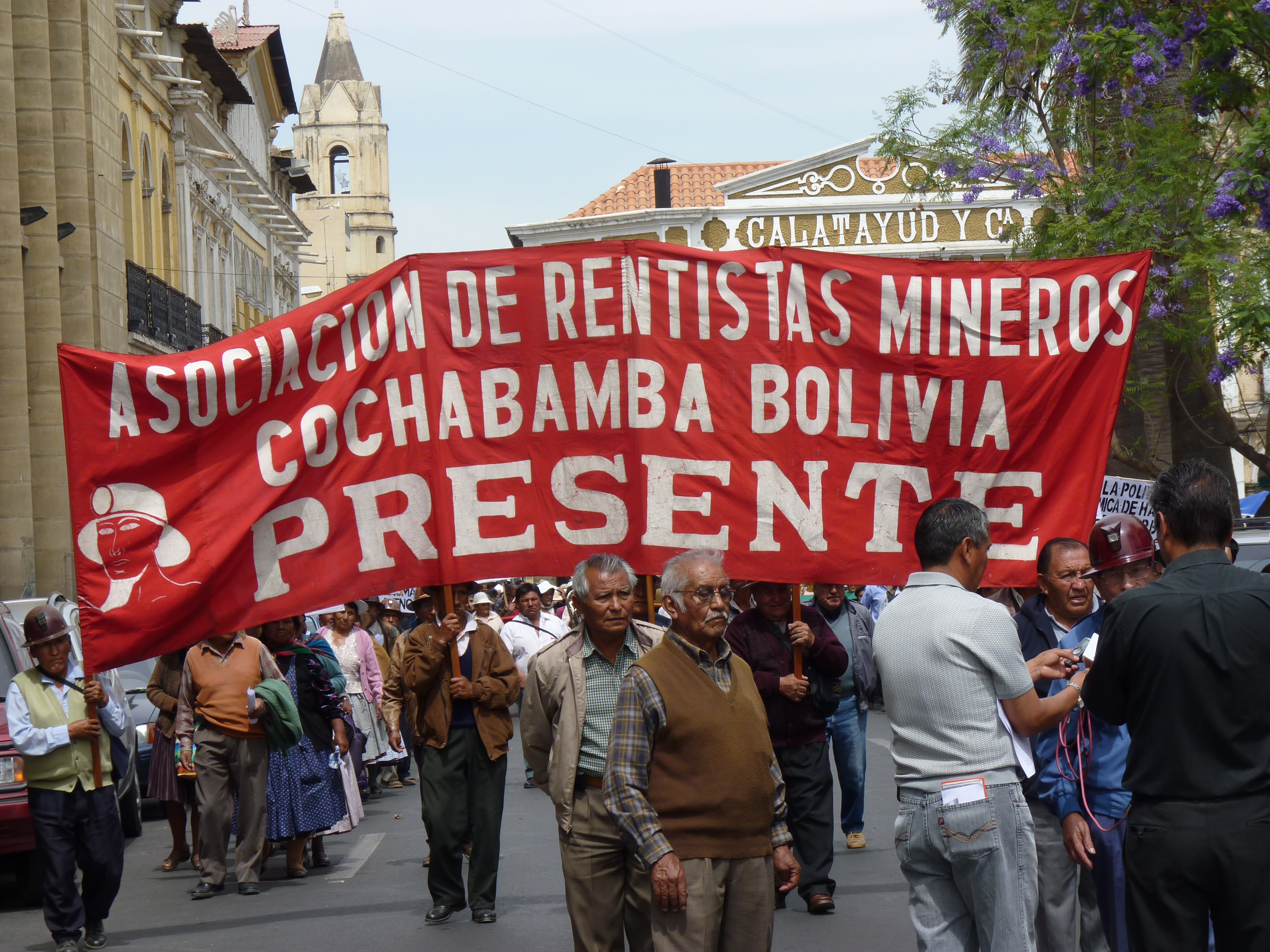
Retired mine workers affiliated with the Cochabamba chapter of the Mining Pensioners' Association march in Cochabamba's Plaza 14 de Septiembre.

In 1985 the world tin market crashed. The MNR-led government of Víctor Paz Estenssoro conceded to an economic restructuring plan set forward by the International Monetary Fund and the World Bank. As part of the plan, the government closed or privatized most of the state-controlled tin mines. The workforce of the state mining company fell from 30,000 in 1985 to just 7,000 in 1987. This devastated the membership of the FSTMB. Many retired mining workers remained active in political life, including as members of the Mining Pensioners' Association (Asociación de Rentistas Mineras).

FSTMB demonstration, June 2005.

Despite its setbacks, the FSTMB remained active in the labor movement and politics. The union was at the forefront of the movement against water privatization in 2000, and has campaigned for nationalization of Bolivia's natural gas reserves. The FSTMB was also involved in the protests that brought the resignations of President Gonzalo Sánchez de Lozada in 2003 and President Carlos Mesa in June 2005. They have also pressured the government to re-nationalize the country's mines.

The current Executive Secretary of the FSTMB is Miguel Zubieta Miranda, who previously led the union's local in Huanuni.
