= Cabinet of Enrique Hertzog =

Bolivian presidential administration and ministerial cabinet from 1947 to 1949

Hertzog cabinet
- 114th–120th Cabinet of Republic of Bolivia
- 1947–1949
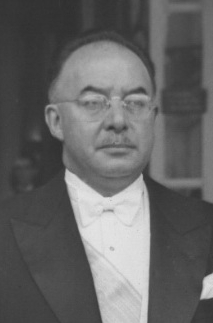
- Date formed: 10 March 1947
- Date dissolved: 20 May 1949 (Note: While Hertzog's presidency officially ended on 22 October 1949, his Vice President Mamerto Urriolagoitía had been acting president since 7 May and formed his own cabinet on 20 May, dissolving the former.)

People and organisations
- President: Enrique Hertzog
- Vice president: Mamerto Urriolagoitía
- No. of ministers: 10 (on 20 May 1949)
- Total no. of members: 48 (including former members)
- Member parties: Republican Socialist Unity Party (PURS); Liberal Party (PL); Revolutionary Left Party (PIR)
- Status in legislature: National unity government

History
- Election: 1947 general election
- Legislature terms: 1947–1949; 1949–1951
- Predecessor: Cabinet of Tomás Monje (interim)
- Successor: Cabinet of Mamerto Urriolagoitía

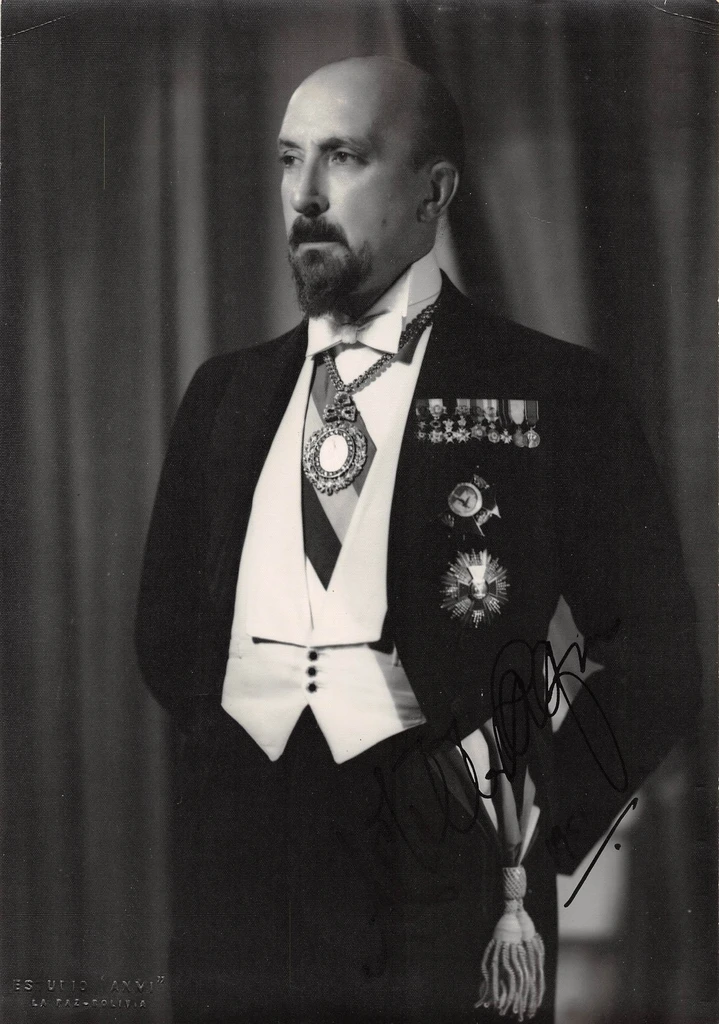
Vice President Mamerto Urriolagoitía served as acting president for much of Hertzog's final year in office

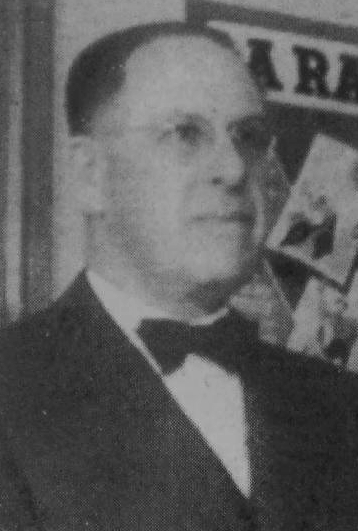
Foreign Minister Luis Fernando Guachalla lost the 1947 general elections to Hertzog by 443 votes

Enrique Hertzog assumed office as the 42nd president of Bolivia on 10 March 1947, and his term ended upon his resignation on 22 October 1949. A physician who served in various ministerial positions since the 1920s, Hertzog was elected as the head of the Republican Socialist Unity Party (PURS) ticket in the 1947 general elections.

Hertzog formed seven cabinets during his 31-month presidency, constituting the 114th to 120th national cabinets of Bolivia. A further two cabinets, constituting the 121st and 122nd national cabinets, were formed during his term by Vice President Mamerto Urriolagoitía who was serving as acting president at the time.

== Cabinet ministers ==
Cabinet of Bolivia Presidency of Enrique Hertzog, 1947–1949
| Office | | Minister | Party | Prof. | Term | Days | N.C (Note: Denoting which national cabinet the minister was originally a part of.) | P.C (Note: Denoting which presidential cabinet the minister was originally a part of.) |
|---|---|---|---|---|---|---|---|---|
| President | | Enrique Hertzog | PURS | Dr. | 10 March 1947 – 22 October 1949 | 957 | – | – |
| Vice President | | Mamerto Urriolagoitía (Note: Acting President from 7 May to 24 October 1949.) | PURS | Law. | 10 March 1947 – 24 October 1949 | 959 | – | – |
| Minister of Foreign Affairs and Worship (Chancellor) | | Mamerto Urriolagoitía | PURS | Law. | 10 March 1947 – 14 May 1947 | 65 | 114 | 1 |
| Minister of Foreign Affairs and Worship (Chancellor) | | Luis Fernando Guachalla | PL | Law. | 14 May 1947 – 11 September 1947 | 120 | 115 | 2 |
| Minister of Foreign Affairs and Worship (Chancellor) | | Tomás Manuel Elío | PL | Law. | 11 September 1947 – 1 March 1948 | 172 | 116 | 3 |
| Minister of Foreign Affairs and Worship (Chancellor) | | Adolfo Costa du Rels | Ind. | Dip. | 1 March 1948 – 9 August 1948 | 161 | 117 | 4 |
| Minister of Foreign Affairs and Worship (Chancellor) | | Javier Paz Campero | PURS | Law. | 9 August 1948 – 28 January 1949 | 172 | 118 | 5 |
| Minister of Foreign Affairs and Worship (Chancellor) | | Juan Manuel Balcázar | PURS | Dr. | 28 January 1949 – 4 March 1949 | 35 | 119 | 6 |
| Minister of Foreign Affairs and Worship (Chancellor) | | Luis Fernando Guachalla | PL | Law. | 4 March 1949 – 20 May 1949 | 77 | 120 | 7 |
| Minister of Foreign Affairs and Worship (Chancellor) | | Waldo Belmonte Pool | PURS | Law. | 20 May 1949 – 2 August 1949 | 74 | 121 | 8(1) (Note: Member of the first cabinet of Mamerto Urriolagoitía as acting president.) |
| Minister of Foreign Affairs and Worship (Chancellor) | | Alberto Saavedra Nogales | PURS | Law. | 2 August 1949 – 28 January 1950 | 179 | 122 | 9(2) (Note: Member of the second cabinet of Mamerto Urriolagoitía as acting president and first Urriolagoitía cabinet as president.) |
| Minister of Government, Justice, and Immigration | | Luis Ponce Lozada | PURS | Law. | 10 March 1947 – 11 September 1947 | 185 | 114 | 1 |
| Minister of Government, Justice, and Immigration | | Luis Ponce Lozada | PURS | Law. | 10 March 1947 – 11 September 1947 | 185 | 115 | 2 |
| Minister of Government, Justice, and Immigration | | Alfredo Mollinedo | PURS | Dr. | 11 September 1947 – 14 April 1950 | 946 | 116 | 3 |
| Minister of Government, Justice, and Immigration | | Alfredo Mollinedo | PURS | Dr. | 11 September 1947 – 14 April 1950 | 946 | 117 | 4 |
| Minister of Government, Justice, and Immigration | | Alfredo Mollinedo | PURS | Dr. | 11 September 1947 – 14 April 1950 | 946 | 118 | 5 |
| Minister of Government, Justice, and Immigration | | Alfredo Mollinedo | PURS | Dr. | 11 September 1947 – 14 April 1950 | 946 | 119 | 6 |
| Minister of Government, Justice, and Immigration | | Alfredo Mollinedo | PURS | Dr. | 11 September 1947 – 14 April 1950 | 946 | 120 | 7 |
| Minister of Government, Justice, and Immigration | | Alfredo Mollinedo | PURS | Dr. | 11 September 1947 – 14 April 1950 | 946 | 121 | 8(1) |
| Minister of Government, Justice, and Immigration | | Alfredo Mollinedo | PURS | Dr. | 11 September 1947 – 14 April 1950 | 946 | 122 | 9(2) |
| Minister of National Defense | | Néstor Guillén | Ind. | Law. | 10 March 1947 – 14 May 1947 | 65 | 114 | 1 |
| Minister of National Defense | | Eduardo Montes Montes | – | Law. | 14 May 1947 – 11 September 1947 | 120 | 115 | 2 |
| Minister of National Defense | | Pedro Zilveti | PURS | Law. | 11 September 1947 – 9 August 1948 | 333 | 116 | 3 |
| Minister of National Defense | | Pedro Zilveti | PURS | Law. | 11 September 1947 – 9 August 1948 | 333 | 117 | 4 |
| Minister of National Defense | | Gustavo Carlos Otero | Ind. | Jrn. | 9 August 1948 – 28 January 1949 | 172 | 118 | 5 |
| Minister of National Defense | | Waldo Belmonte Pool | PURS | Law. | 28 January 1949 – 20 May 1949 | 112 | 119 | 6 |
| Minister of National Defense | | Waldo Belmonte Pool | PURS | Law. | 28 January 1949 – 20 May 1949 | 112 | 120 | 7 |
| Minister of National Defense | | Vicente Leyton | – | – | 20 May 1949 – 2 August 1949 | 74 | 121 | 8(1) |
| Minister of National Defense | | Manuel Diez Canseco (Note: Acting Foreign Minister in the absence of Alberto Saavedra Nogales from 2 to 17 August 1949.) | PURS | Law. | 2 August 1949 – 28 January 1950 | 179 | 122 | 9(2) |
| Minister of Finance and Statistics | | Alcides Molina | – | – | 10 March 1947 – 11 September 1947 | 185 | 114 | 1 |
| Minister of Finance and Statistics | | Alcides Molina | – | – | 10 March 1947 – 11 September 1947 | 185 | 115 | 2 |
| Minister of Finance and Statistics | | Carlos Guachalla | PL | – | 11 September 1947 – 14 January 1948 | 125 | 116 | 3 |
| Minister of Finance and Statistics | | José Romero Loza | – | – | 14 January 1948 – 28 January 1949 | 380 | 116 | 3 |
| Minister of Finance and Statistics | | José Romero Loza | – | – | 14 January 1948 – 28 January 1949 | 380 | 117 | 4 |
| Minister of Finance and Statistics | | José Romero Loza | – | – | 14 January 1948 – 28 January 1949 | 380 | 118 | 5 |
| Minister of Finance and Statistics | | Vicente Leyton | – | – | 28 January 1949 – 4 March 1949 | 35 | 119 | 6 |
| Minister of Finance and Statistics | | Héctor Ormachea Zalles | – | Law. | 4 March 1949 – 20 May 1949 | 77 | 120 | 7 |
| Minister of Finance and Statistics | | Alfredo Alexander Alvestegui | – | Law. | 20 May 1949 – 2 August 1949 | 74 | 121 | 8(1) |
| Minister of Finance and Statistics | | Rafael Parada Suarez | – | – | 2 August 1949 – 28 January 1950 | 179 | 122 | 9(2) |
| Minister of Economy | | Germán Costas (Note: Acting Foreign Minister in the absence of Luis Fernando Guachalla from 11 August to 4 September 1947.) | PURS | Eco. | 10 March 1947 – 11 September 1947 | 185 | 114 | 1 |
| Minister of Economy | | Germán Costas | PURS | Eco. | 10 March 1947 – 11 September 1947 | 185 | 115 | 2 |
| Minister of Economy | | Raul Laguna Lozada | – | Law. | 11 September 1947 – 1 March 1948 | 172 | 116 | 3 |
| Minister of Economy | | Arturo Gutiérrez; Tezanos-Pinto (Note: Acting Foreign Minister in the absence of Adolfo Costa du Rels from 9 to 15 August 1948.) | PL | Eco. | 1 March 1948 – 9 August 1948 | 161 | 117 | 4 |
| Minister of Economy | | Ernesto Monasterios | PURS | Law. | 9 August 1948 – 28 January 1949 | 172 | 118 | 5 |
| Minister of Economy | | Alberto Sarti Peláez | – | – | 28 January 1949 – 4 March 1949 | 35 | 119 | 6 |
| Minister of Economy | | Germán Zegarra Caero | – | – | 4 March 1949 – 20 May 1949 | 77 | 120 | 7 |
| Minister of Economy | | Alberto Sarti Peláez | – | – | 20 May 1949 – 2 August 1949 | 74 | 121 | 8(1) |
| Minister of Economy | | José Romero Loza | – | – | 2 August 1949 – 28 January 1950 | 179 | 122 | 9(2) |
| Minister of Public Works and Communications | | Aniceto Quezada | – | – | 10 March 1947 – 14 May 1947 | 65 | 114 | 1 |
| Minister of Public Works and Communications | | Gustavo Henrich | PIR | – | 14 May 1947 – 1 March 1948 | 292 | 115 | 2 |
| Minister of Public Works and Communications | | Gustavo Henrich | PIR | – | 14 May 1947 – 1 March 1948 | 292 | 116 | 3 |
| Minister of Public Works and Communications | | Luis Ponce Lozada | PURS | – | 1 March 1948 – 9 August 1948 | 161 | 117 | 4 |
| Minister of Public Works and Communications | | Constantino Carrión | – | Law. | 9 August 1948 – 28 January 1949 | 172 | 118 | 5 |
| Minister of Public Works and Communications | | Guillermo Gutiérrez; Vea Murguía | PURS | – | 28 January 1949 – 25 June 1949 | 148 | 119 | 6 |
| Minister of Public Works and Communications | | Guillermo Gutiérrez; Vea Murguía | PURS | – | 28 January 1949 – 25 June 1949 | 148 | 120 | 7 |
| Minister of Public Works and Communications | | Guillermo Gutiérrez; Vea Murguía | PURS | – | 28 January 1949 – 25 June 1949 | 148 | 121 | 8(1) |
| Minister of Public Works and Communications | | Office vacant 25 June 1949 – 2 August 1949 | | | | | 121 | 8(1) |
| Minister of Public Works and Communications | | Alfredo Gutiérrez Salgar | – | – | 2 August 1949 – 16 October 1950 | 440 | 122 | 9(2) |
| Minister of Work and Social Security | Minister of Health | Carlos Morales Ugarte | Ind. | Law. | 10 March 1947 – 14 May 1947 | 65 | 114 | 1 |
| Minister of Work and Social Security | – | Alfredo Mendizábal | PIR | Law. | 14 May 1947 – 11 September 1947 | 120 | 115 | 2 |
| Minister of Work and Social Security | – | Daniel Gamarra | PURS | – | 11 September 1947 – 1 March 1948 | 172 | 116 | 3 |
| Minister of Work and Social Security | – | Ernesto Monasterios | PURS | Law. | 1 March 1948 – 9 August 1948 | 161 | 117 | 4 |
| Minister of Work and Social Security | – | Julio Céspedes Añez | PURS | Law. | 9 August 1948 – 11 August 1948 | 2 | 118 | 5 |
| Minister of Work and Social Security | – | Julio Tellez Reyes | – | Law. | 11 August 1948 – 28 January 1949 | 170 | 118 | 5 |
| Minister of Work and Social Security | – | Fernando Loayza Beltrán | Ind. | – | 28 January 1949 – 4 March 1949 | 35 | 119 | 6 |
| Minister of Work and Social Security | – | Gastón Arauz Eguía | – | – | 4 March 1949 – 20 May 1949 | 77 | 120 | 7 |
| Minister of Work and Social Security | – | Germán Zegarra Caero | – | – | 20 May 1949 – 2 August 1949 | 74 | 121 | 8(1) |
| Minister of Work and Social Security | – | Eduardo del Grando | – | – | 2 August 1949 – 28 January 1950 | 179 | 122 | 9(2) |
| Minister of Health and Hygiene | | Office under the Ministry of Work and Social Security until 14 May 1947 | | | | | | |
| Minister of Health and Hygiene | | Carlos Morales Ugarte | Ind. | Law. | 14 May 1947 – 11 September 1947 | 120 | 115 | 2 |
| Minister of Health and Hygiene | | Melchor Pinto | Ind. | Dr. | 11 September 1947 – 1 March 1948 | 172 | 116 | 3 |
| Minister of Health and Hygiene | | Juan Manuel Balcázar | PURS | Dr. | 1 March 1948 – 28 January 1949 | 333 | 117 | 4 |
| Minister of Health and Hygiene | | Juan Manuel Balcázar | PURS | Dr. | 1 March 1948 – 28 January 1949 | 333 | 118 | 5 |
| Minister of Health and Hygiene | | Agustín Benavides | – | – | 28 January 1949 – 4 March 1949 | 35 | 119 | 6 |
| Minister of Health and Hygiene | | Juan Manuel Balcázar | PURS | Dr. | 4 March 1949 – 2 August 1949 | 151 | 120 | 7 |
| Minister of Health and Hygiene | | Juan Manuel Balcázar | PURS | Dr. | 4 March 1949 – 2 August 1949 | 151 | 121 | 8(1) |
| Minister of Health and Hygiene | | Agustín Benavides | – | – | 2 August 1949 – 28 January 1950 | 179 | 122 | 9(2) |
| Minister of Education and Indigenous Affairs | – | Armando Alba Zambrana | Ind. | Wri. | 10 March 1947 – 14 January 1948 | 310 | 114 | 1 |
| Minister of Education and Indigenous Affairs | – | Armando Alba Zambrana | Ind. | Wri. | 10 March 1947 – 14 January 1948 | 310 | 115 | 2 |
| Minister of Education and Indigenous Affairs | Minister of Fine Arts | Alberto Salinas López | PURS | – | 14 January 1948 – 1 March 1948 | 47 | 116 | 3 |
| Minister of Education and Indigenous Affairs | Minister of Fine Arts | Víctor Cabrera Lozada | – | – | 1 March 1948 – 9 August 1948 | 161 | 117 | 4 |
| Minister of Education and Indigenous Affairs | – | Antonio Rico Toro | – | Law. | 9 August 1948 – 4 March 1949 | 207 | 118 | 5 |
| Minister of Education and Indigenous Affairs | – | Antonio Rico Toro | – | Law. | 9 August 1948 – 4 March 1949 | 207 | 119 | 6 |
| Minister of Education and Indigenous Affairs | Minister of Fine Arts | José Chávez Suárez | PL | Law. | 4 March 1949 – 20 May 1949 | 77 | 120 | 7 |
| Minister of Education and Indigenous Affairs | Minister of Fine Arts | Elizardo Pérez | Ind. | Tch. | 20 May 1949 – 2 August 1949 | 74 | 121 | 8(1) |
| Minister of Education and Indigenous Affairs | – | Abraham Valdez | – | – | 2 August 1949 – 29 June 1950 | 331 | 122 | 9(2) |
| Minister of Agriculture, Livestock, and Colonization | | José Saavedra Suárez | PURS | – | 26 August 1946 – 14 May 1947 | 261 | 113 (Note: Originally a member of the 113th national cabinet of Bolivia.) | 1 (Note: Originally a member of the Monje ministerial cabinet.) |
| Minister of Agriculture, Livestock, and Colonization | | Osvaldo Gutiérrez | PL | Law. | 14 May 1947 – 11 September 1947 | 120 | 115 | 2 |
| Minister of Agriculture, Livestock, and Colonization | | Eduardo Tardío | – | Law. | 11 September 1947 – 1 March 1948 | 172 | 116 | 3 |
| Minister of Agriculture, Livestock, and Colonization | | Germán Zegarra Caero | – | – | 1 March 1948 – 9 August 1948 | 161 | 117 | 4 |
| Minister of Agriculture, Livestock, and Colonization | | Eduardo Guzmán Villa | – | – | 9 August 1948 – 28 January 1949 | 172 | 118 | 5 |
| Minister of Agriculture, Livestock, and Colonization | | Gilfredo Cortés Candia | PURS | Wri. | 28 January 1949 – 4 March 1949 | 35 | 119 | 6 |
| Minister of Agriculture, Livestock, and Colonization | | Miguel Mercado Moreira | PL | – | 4 March 1949 – 20 May 1949 | 77 | 120 | 7 |
| Minister of Agriculture, Livestock, and Colonization | | Gilfredo Cortés Candia | PURS | Wri. | 20 May 1949 – 28 January 1950 | 253 | 121 | 8(1) |
| Minister of Agriculture, Livestock, and Colonization | | Gilfredo Cortés Candia | PURS | Wri. | 20 May 1949 – 28 January 1950 | 253 | 122 | 9(2) |

== Composition ==
=== First cabinet ===
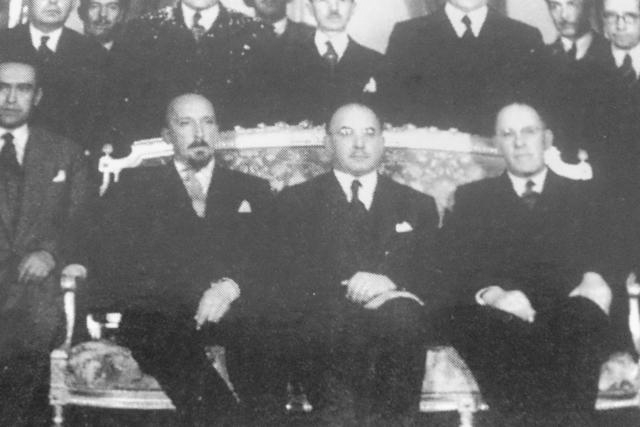
President Hertzog, flanked by Vice President Mamerto Urriolagoitía (left) and Foreign Minister Luis Fernando Guachalla (right), with his second council of ministers

Upon his inauguration on 10 March 1947, Hertzog appointed his first ministerial cabinet. The cabinet was a return to the more conservative elements of the country which had been sidelined during the left-wing government of Gualberto Villarroel. It predominantly consisted of members of the newly formed Republican Socialist Unity Party (PURS) created from the merger of the Genuine Republican, Socialist Republican, and United Socialist parties.

The only holdover from the previous administration was José Saavedra Suárez as Minister of Agriculture. Néstor Guillén, who had served as interim president and Minister of Defense following the death of Villarroel, returned to his defense position. Mamerto Urriolagoitía was appointed Foreign Minister in conjunction with his position as vice president.

=== Second cabinet ===
Unlike the Republicans, the Liberal Party did not become a founding member of the PURS. Nonetheless, Hertzog attempted to form a national unity cabinet and invited the PL to join in alliance with the new government, a fact which upset PURS leadership as well as Vice President Urriolagoitía. When Hertzog formed his second cabinet on 14 May 1947, Luis Fernando Guachalla, who had been the Liberal presidential candidate in 1947 losing to Hertzog by a difference of just 443 votes, was chosen to succeed Urriolagoitía as Foreign Minister. Despite being ideologically Communist, the Revolutionary Left Party also joined the conservative coalition with two of its members, Gustavo Henrich and Alfredo Mendizábal, being appointed Ministers of Public Works and Communications and Work and Social Security respectively.

=== Third, fourth, fifth, and sixth cabinets ===
Hertzog's third cabinet was formed on 11 September 1947. Guachalla was replaced as Foreign Minister by Tomás Manuel Elío who would serve his fifth and final nonconsecutive term. Luis Fernando's brother, Carlos Guachalla, was appointed Ministry of Finance. Hertzog's fourth cabinet, formed on 1 March 1948, saw Adolfo Costa du Rels appointed Foreign Minister. Costa du Rels had previously been the last President of the League of Nations, which by 1947 was defunct in favor of the United Nations.

Hertzog's fifth cabinet was formed on 9 August 1948. At just two days from 9 to 11 August, the term of office of Julio Céspedes Añez as Minister of Work and Social Security is the second shortest term for any Bolivian government minister after Juan José Torres who served for just one day from 5 to 6 November 1964 during the government of René Barrientos. Formed on 28 January 1949, Hertzog's sixth cabinet introduced Waldo Belmonte Pool, a previous President of the Chamber of Senators and acting president during the administration of Enrique Peñaranda, as Minister of National Defense.

=== Seventh cabinet and Urriolagoitía acting cabinets ===
Hertzog's seventh and final cabinet was formed on 4 March 1949. This one would only last for two months. On 1 May 1949, legislative elections were held in which the left-wing parties dramatically rose in support. Following subsequent election-related violence, PURS leadership lost confidence in Hertzog and forced him to hand power under the pretence of a nonexistent illness to Vice President Mamerto Urriolagoitía on 7 May. In his capacity as acting president, Urriolagoitía formed two cabinets on 20 May and 2 August 1949. However, Hertzog would not officially resign until 22 October meaning both cabinets were formed during his term. Nevertheless, the fact that the ministers were appointed by Urriolagoitía mean that they are generally regarded as Urriolagoitía's first and second cabinets rather than Hertzog's eight and ninth.

== Gallery ==
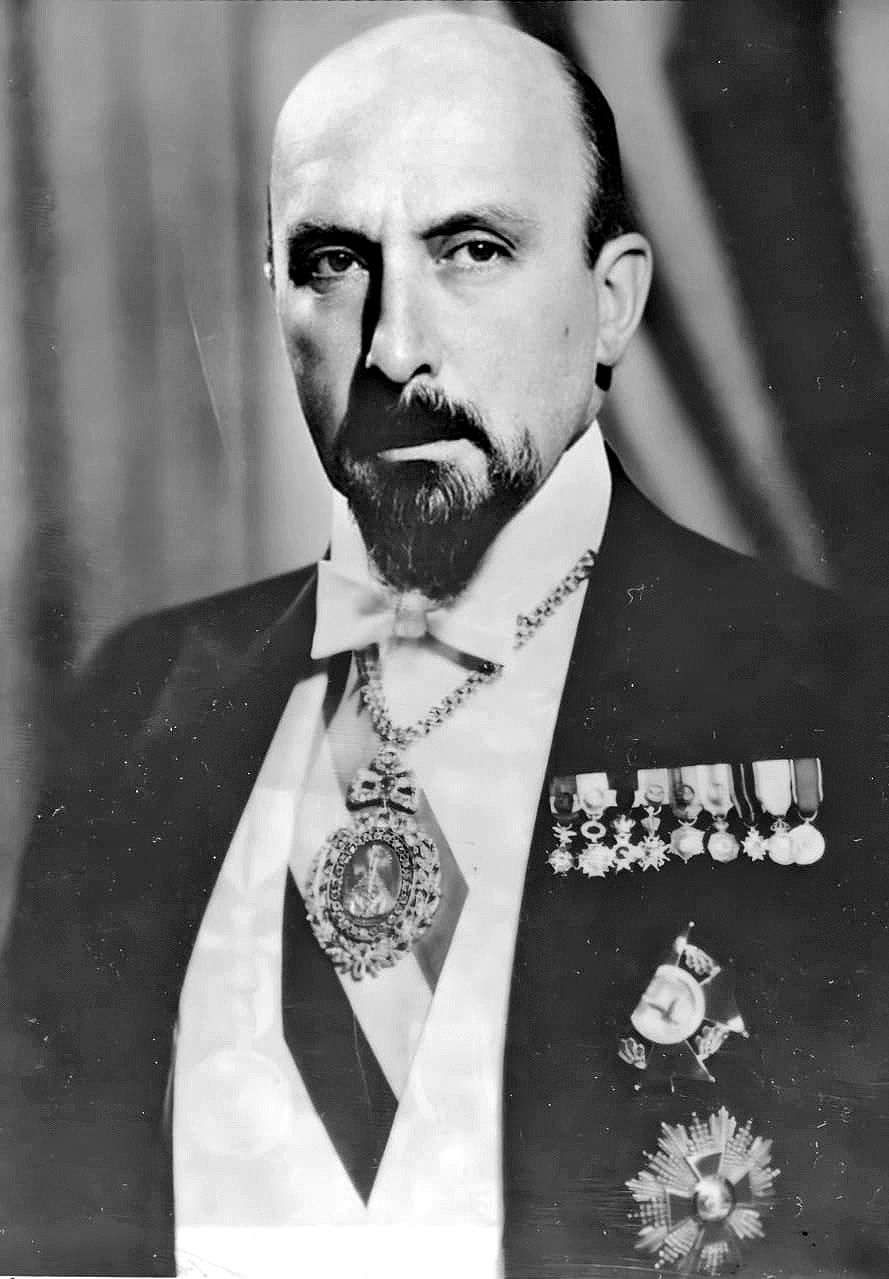
Mamerto Urriolagoitía –
Vice President, Acting President, and Minister of Foreign Affairs (PURS)

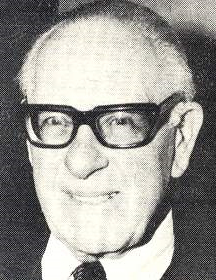
Luis Fernando Guachalla –
Minister of Foreign Affairs (PL)

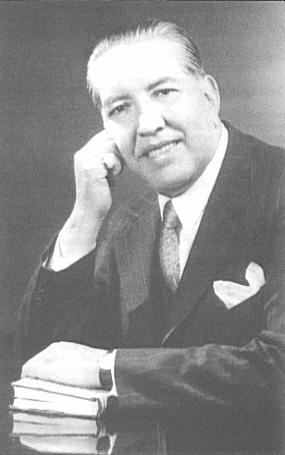
Tomás Manuel Elío –
Minister of Foreign Affairs (PL)

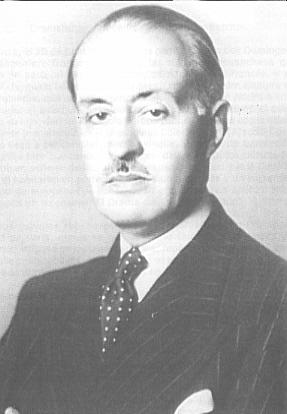
Adolfo Costa du Rels –
Minister of Foreign Affairs

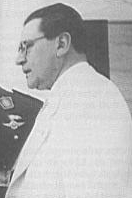
Javier Paz Campero –
Minister of Foreign Affairs (PURS)

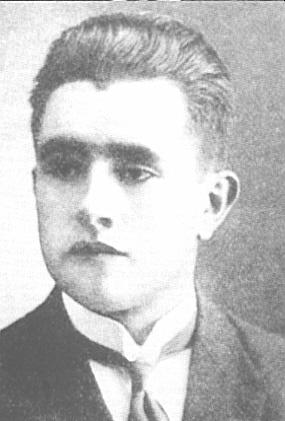
Juan Manuel Balcázar –
Minister of Foreign Affairs (PURS)

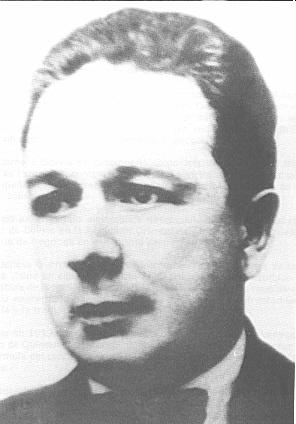
Waldo Belmonte Pool –
Minister of Foreign Affairs and Minister of National Defense (PURS)

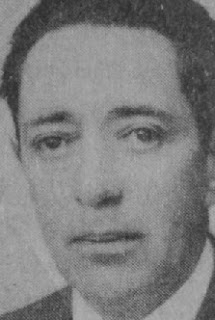
Alberto Saavedra Nogales –
Minister of Foreign Affairs (PURS)

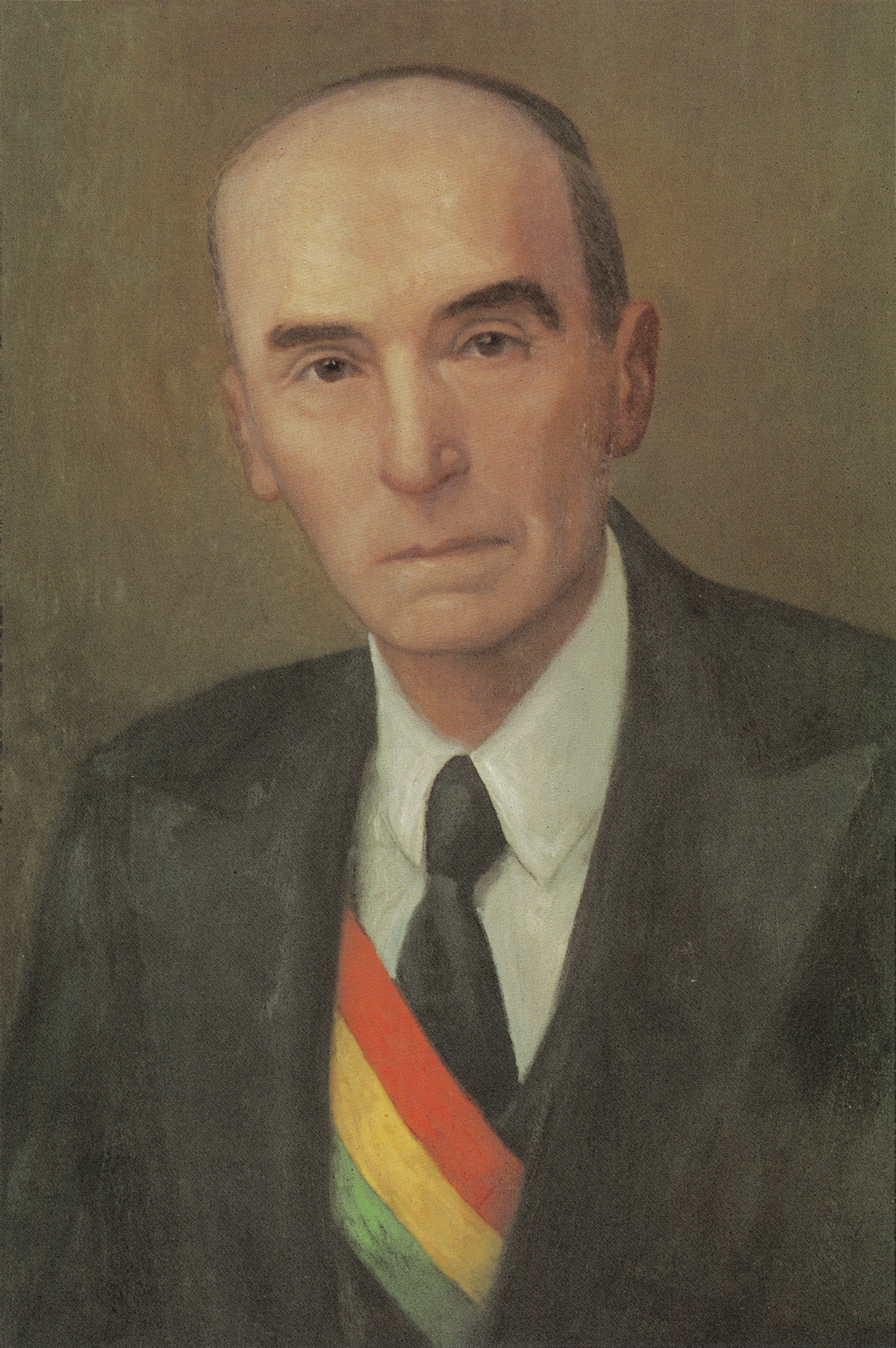
Néstor Guillén –
Minister of National Defense

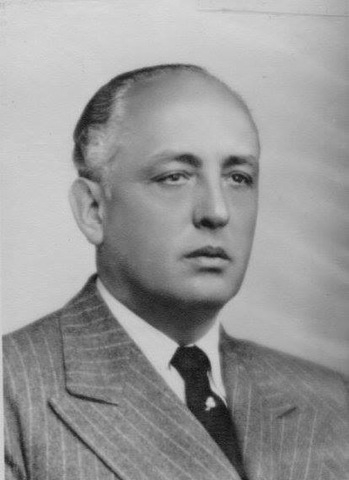
Pedro Zilveti –
Minister of National Defense (PURS)

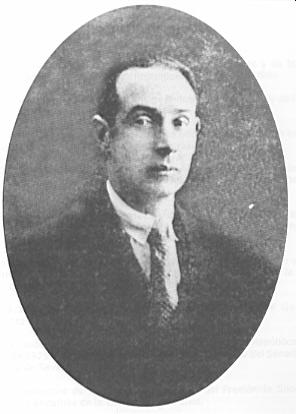
Manuel Diez Canseco –
Minister of National Defense (PURS)

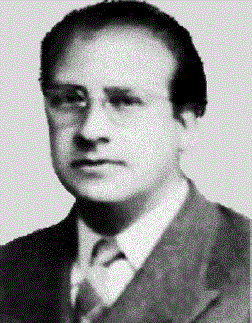
Héctor Ormachea Zalles –
Minister of Finance

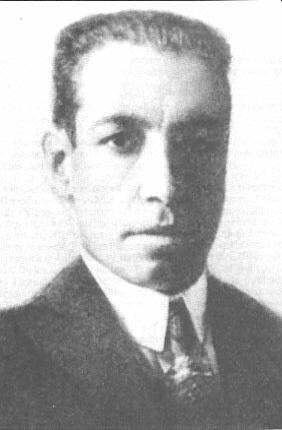
Germán Costas –
Minister of Economy (PURS)

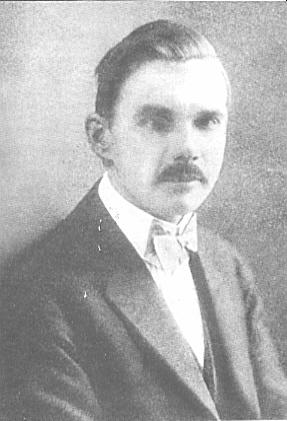
Arturo Gutiérrez Tezanos-Pinto –
Minister of Economy (PL)

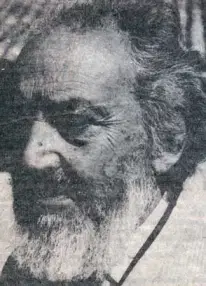
Carlos Morales Ugarte –
Minister of Work and Health

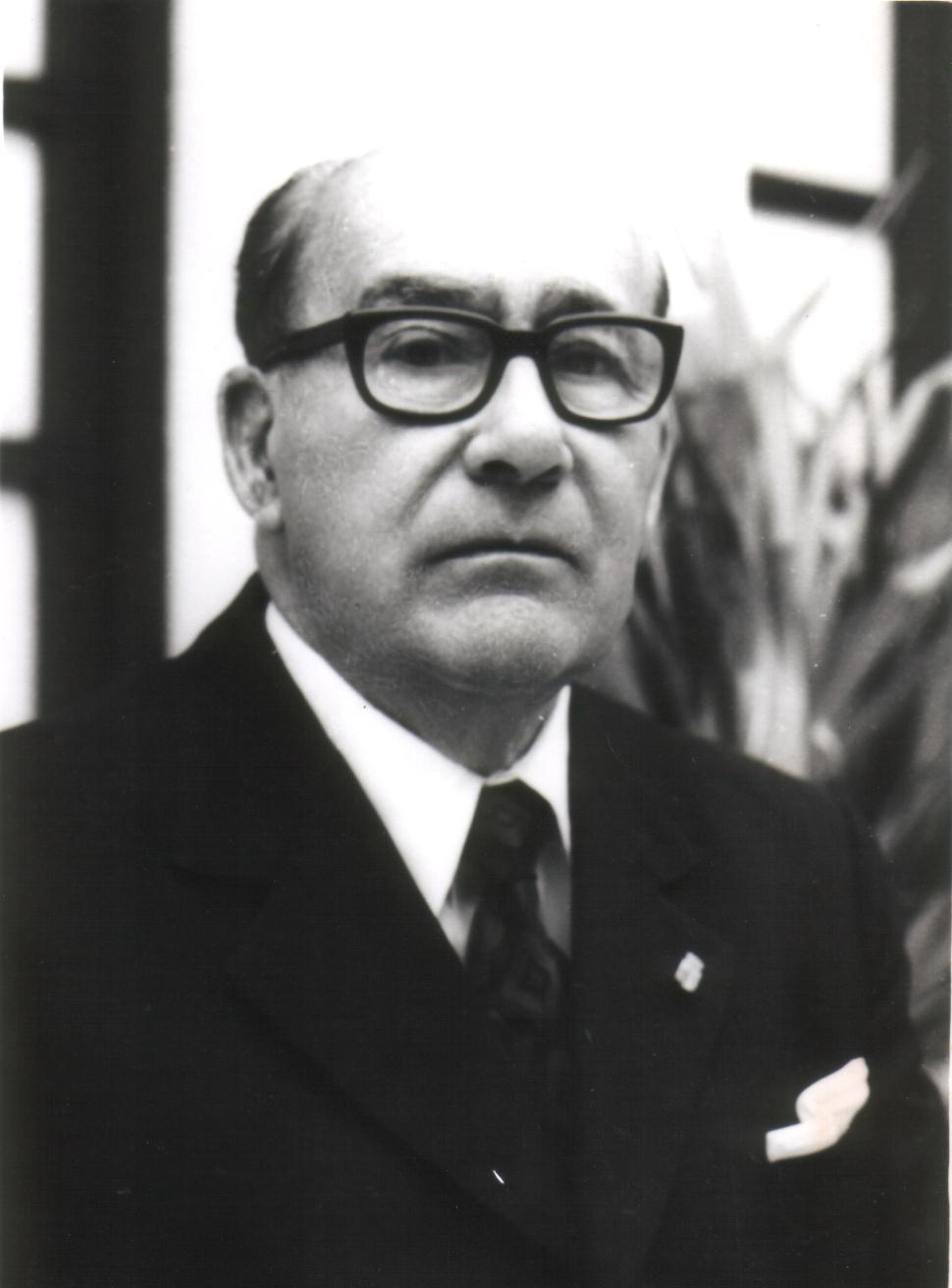
Melchor Pinto –
Minister of Health

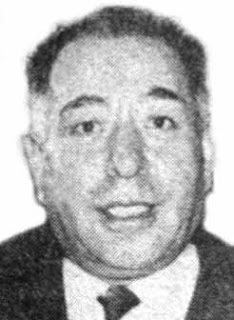
Armando Alba Zambrana –
Minister of Education

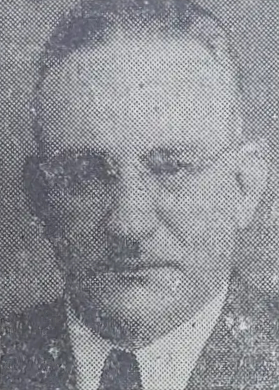
Osvaldo Gutiérrez –
Minister of Agriculture (PL)

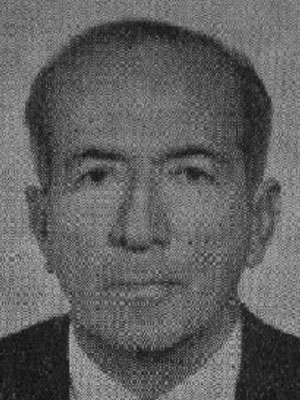
Gilfredo Cortés Candia –
Minister of Agriculture (PURS)

== Bibliography ==
- Gisbert, Carlos D. Mesa (2003). Presidentes de Bolivia: entre urnas y fusiles : el poder ejecutivo, los ministros de estado (in Spanish). Editorial Gisbert. pp. 348–350.
