= Cabinet of Tomás Monje =

Bolivian presidential administration and ministerial cabinet from 1946 to 1947

Monje cabinet
- 113th Cabinet of the Republic of Bolivia
- 1946–1947
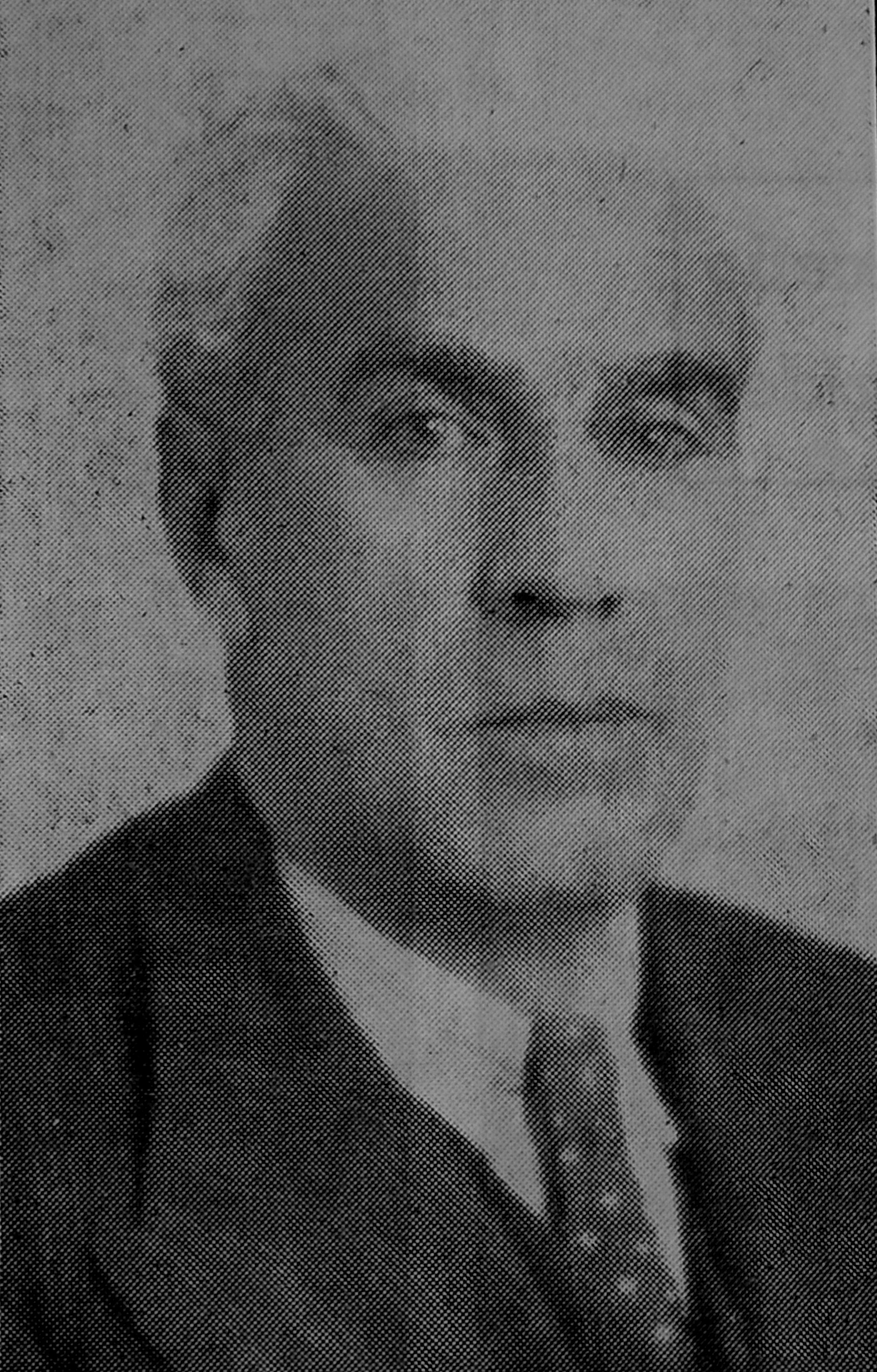
- Date formed: 17 August 1946
- Date dissolved: 10 March 1947

People and organisations
- President: Tomás Monje
- Vice President: Vacant
- No. of ministers: 7 (on 10 March 1947)
- Total no. of members: 8 (including former members)
- Member party: Caretaker government

History
- Predecessor: Cabinet of Néstor Guillén (interim)
- Successor: Cabinet of Enrique Hertzog

Tomás Monje assumed office as the interim 41st President of Bolivia on 17 August 1946, and his mandate ended on 10 March 1947. The President of the Superior District Court of La Paz, Monje was chosen to lead an interim junta following the violent overthrow of President Gualberto Villarroel on 21 July 1946. Having been ill at the time, Monje only assumed the position 27 days later, chairing the junta until new elections could be held.

Monje formed one cabinet nine days after taking office, constituting the 113th national cabinet of Bolivia as part of the 1946–1947 Government Junta.

== Cabinet Ministers ==
Cabinet of Bolivia Interim Presidency of Tomás Monje, 1946–1947
Office	Minister	Party	Prof.	Term	Days	N.C (Note: Denoting which national cabinet the minister was originally a part of.)	P.C (Note: Denoting which presidential cabinet the minister was originally a part of.)
President	Tomás Monje	Ind.	Mag.	17 August 1946 – 10 March 1947	205	–	–
Vice President	Office vacant throughout presidency					–	–
Secretary-General of the Junta	Roberto Bilbao la Vieja (Note: Acting Foreign Minister in the absence of Aniceto Solares from 27 August to 2 September 1946.)	–	Law.	24 July 1946 – 10 March 1947	216	112 (Note: Originally a member of the 112th national cabinet of Bolivia.)	1 (Note: Originally a member of the Guillén ministerial cabinet.)
Minister of Foreign Affairs and Worship (Chancellor)	Aniceto Solares	PRG	Dip.	24 July 1946 – 7 March 1947	226	112	1
Minister of Foreign Affairs and Worship (Chancellor)	Office vacant 7 March 1947 – 10 March 1947					113	1
Minister of Government and Justice	Office vacant 26 August 1946 – 10 March 1947					113	1
Minister of National Defense	Julio César Canelas	–	–	26 August 1946 – 10 March 1947	196	113	1
Minister of Economy	Eduardo Saenz García (Note: Acting Foreign Minister in the absence of Aniceto Solares from 28 October to 12 November 1946 and 17 January to 7 March 1947.)	PSD	Law.	26 August 1946 – 10 March 1947	196	113	1
Minister of Public Works and Communications	Carlos Muñoz Roldán	–	–	26 August 1946 – 10 March 1947	196	113	1
Minister of Work, Health, and Social Security	Aurelio Alcoba	PIR	Uni.	24 July 1946 – 10 March 1947	229	112	1
Minister of Education, Fine Arts, and Indigenous Affairs	Manuel Elías P.	–	Mus.	26 August 1946 – 10 March 1947	196	113	1
Minister of Agriculture, Livestock, and Colonization	José Saavedra Suárez	PSU	–	26 August 1946 – 14 May 1947	261	113	1 (Note: Held over into the Hertzog cabinet.)

== Composition ==
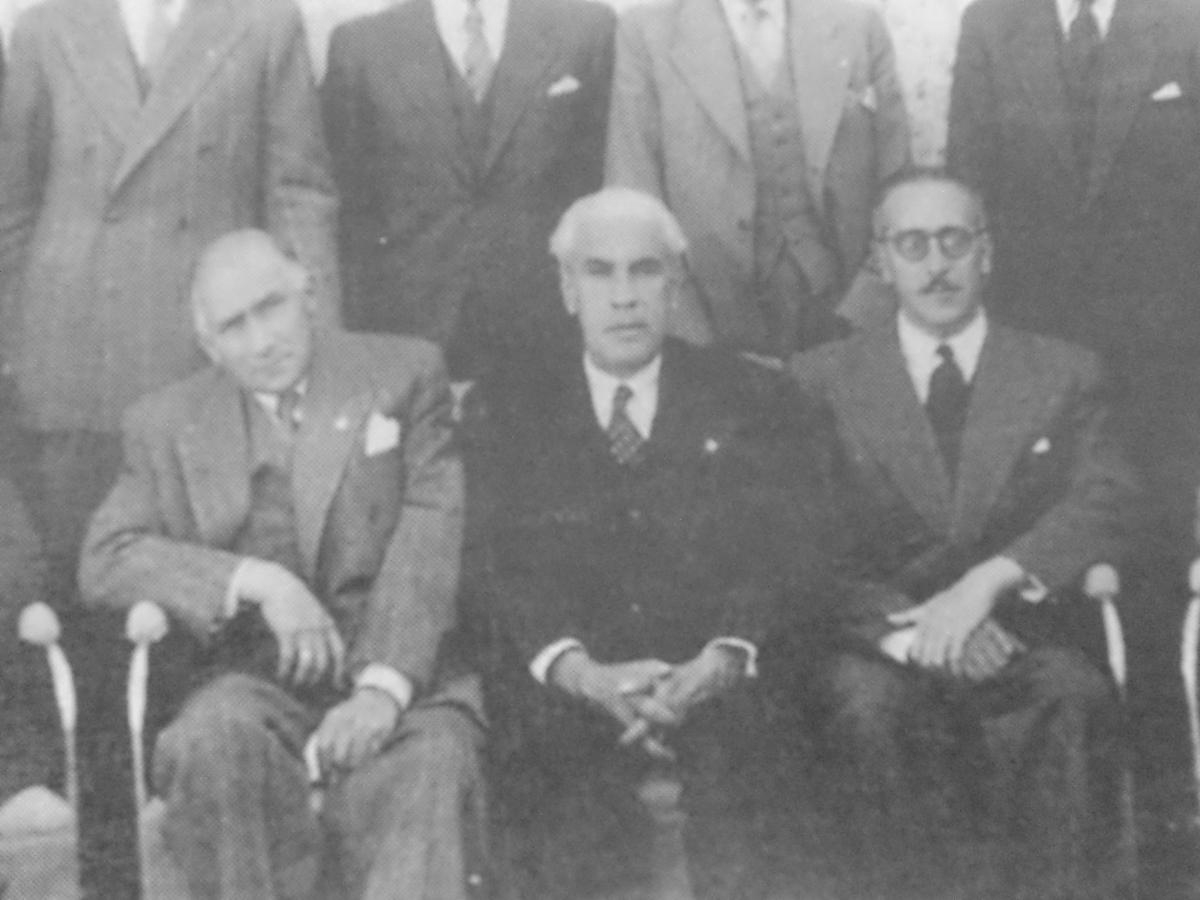
President Monje with members of ministerial cabinet in 1947

All previous members of the cabinet of Néstor Guillén including Guillén himself remained in office upon the assumption of Monje as interim president. They were dismissed when Monje formed his own cabinet on 26 August, with the exception of Secretary-General Roberto Bilbao la Vieja, Foreign Minister Aniceto Solares, and Minister of Work and Social Security Aurelio Alcoba who remained in their positions for the duration of Monje's mandate. The newly appointed members were Julio César Canelas (Defense), Eduardo Saenz García (Economy), Carlos Muñoz Roldán (Public Works), Manuel Elías P. (Education), and José Saavedra Suárez (Agriculture).

The civil junta and Monje's mandate ended on 10 March 1947 upon the inauguration of Enrique Hertzog, the winner of the 1947 general elections.

== Gallery ==
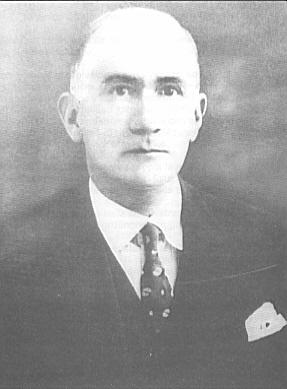
Aniceto Solares –
Minister of Foreign Affairs and Minister of Education (PRG)

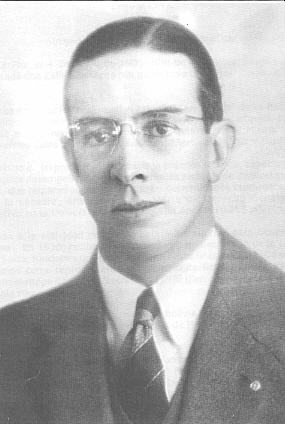
Eduardo Saenz García –
Minister of Economy and Minister of Finance (PSD)

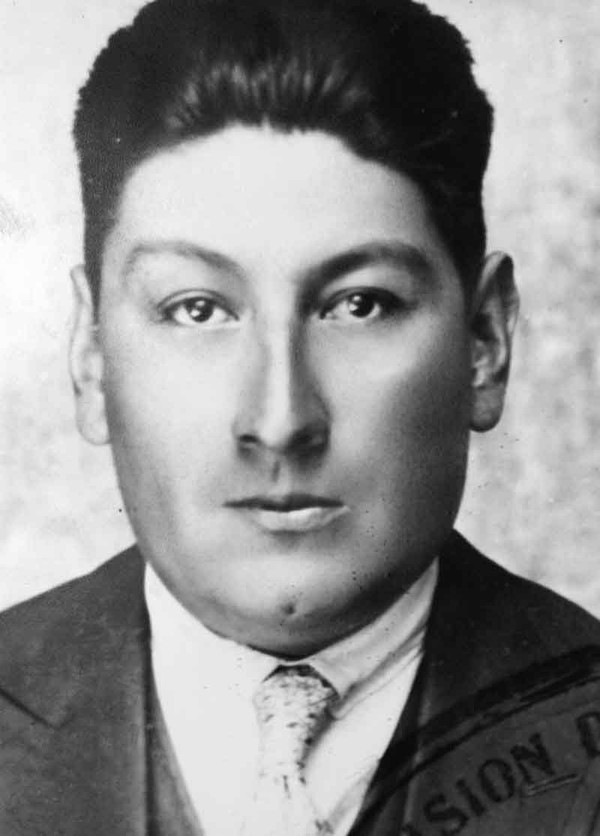
Manuel Elías P. –
Minister of Education

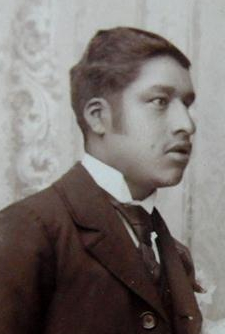
Aurelio Alcoba –
Minister of Workand Health (PIR)

== Bibliography ==
- Gisbert, Carlos D. Mesa (2003). Presidentes de Bolivia: entre urnas y fusiles : el poder ejecutivo, los ministros de estado (in Spanish). Editorial Gisbert. p. 344.
