= Government Junta of Bolivia (1946–1947) =

Civil junta ruling Bolivia (1946–1947)

The Government Junta of Bolivia (Spanish: Junta de Gobierno), officially known as the Honorable Government Junta (Spanish: Excelentisima Junta de Gobierno), was a civil junta which ruled Bolivia from 21 July 1946 through 10 March 1947. It consisted of labor, teacher, and student representatives as well as magistrates of the Superior District Court of La Paz. The President of the Junta was Superior District Court President Tomás Monje who was appointed following the violent overthrow of President Gualberto Villarroel on 21 July 1946. As Monje was ill at the time of Villarroel's death, Néstor Guillén, the Dean of the Superior District Court, took charge for the first 27 days before delegating command to Monje on 17 August 1946. As President of the Junta, Monje acted as a neutral figure heading the transition back to civilian government. The junta was dissolved on 10 March 1947 when Enrique Hertzog, winner of the January general election, took office as president.

== Formation ==
=== 1946 coup d'état ===
On 21 July 1946, weeks of increasingly violent protests and strikes led by teachers and students of the Higher University of San Andrés (UMSA) resulted in full-scale riots in La Paz. President Gualberto Villarroel of the RADEPA military lodge was lynched and hanged as his government collapsed entirely. Members of the Revolutionary Nationalist Movement took refuge in foreign embassies or fled the country as conservative forces, sidelined since Villarroel's assumption to power in 1943, reasserted themselves within the country.

=== Junta under Guillén ===
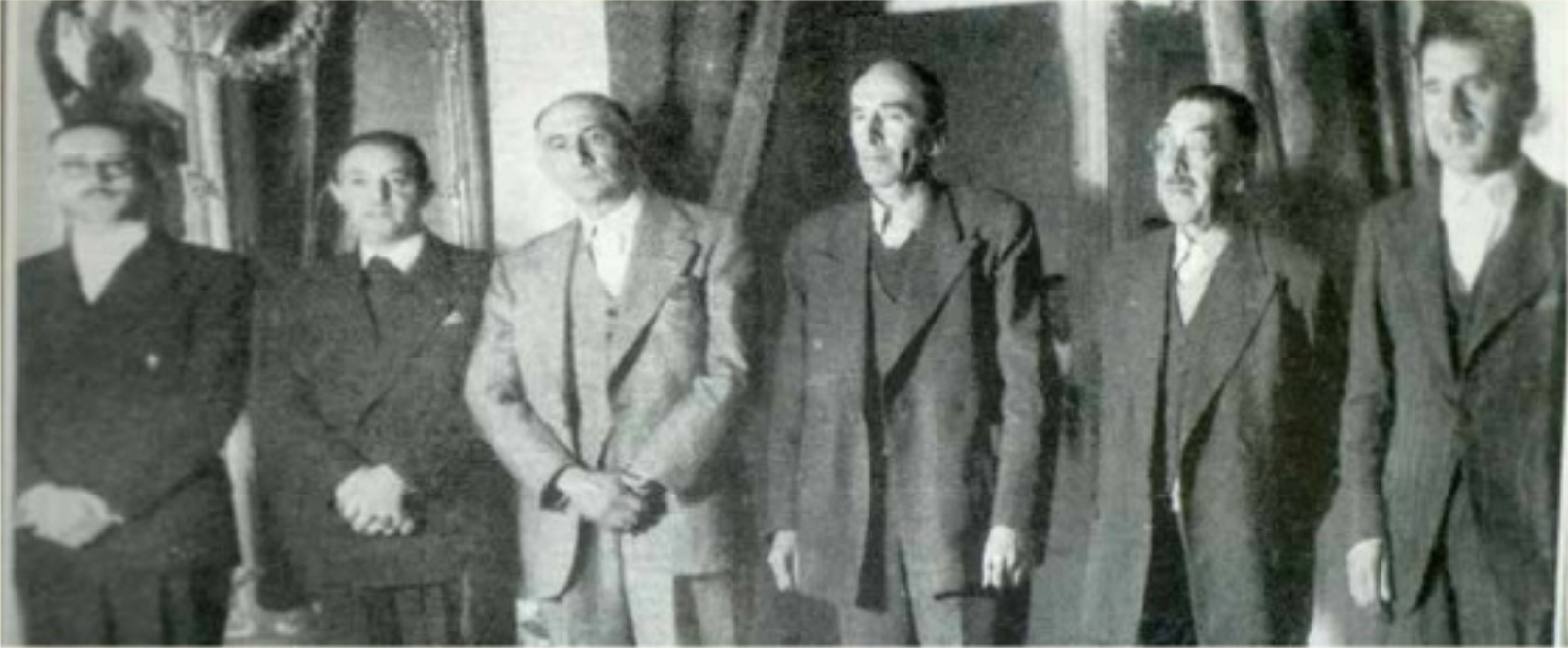
Members of the early government junta including President Néstor Guillén (fourth from left) in mid-1946

A general state of anarchy coupled with a crisis of succession followed the death and hanging of President Villarroel. Once the rioting died down, it was decided that provisional command of the government would be delegated to the Superior Court of Justice of the judicial district of La Paz whose magistrates were to head an interim junta presided over by Superior District Court President Tomás Monje. As Monje was ill and hence unable to assume leadership at the time, Superior District Court Dean Néstor Guillén was chosen to chair the junta in an interim capacity. Guillén was joined by five other court judges: Cleto Cabrera García, Juan Armaza Ribert, Carlos Pacheco Núñez, Pacífico Ledezma, and Daniel Guisbert.

On 22 July, participation in the junta was expanded to other sectors and the number of members was reduced. All district court judges except Guillén and Cabrera García stepped down while Carlos Montaño Daza and Raúl Calvimontes joined, the latter as secretary-general. Immediately on 23 July, the junta published an eleven-point statement of intent. Among the first points was the commitment to respect domestic civil liberties as well as international agreements with other countries. The junta also pledged to call fresh, democratic presidential and legislative elections within three to four months. Having deemed the confiscation of newspapers by the previous government unconstitutional, the junta announced its intent to return these to their owners. By that point, the process had already begun with the newspaper La Razón having been returned to its publisher on 21 July. El Diaro became the first newspaper to return to daily circulation on 22 July. Further, all government offices were officially reopened at 2 p.m. on 23 July.

That same day, at the direct order of Guillén, UMSA Rector Héctor Ormachea met with United States Ambassador Joseph Flack. Ormachea outlined the junta's intent to issue three decrees which would define the new government as one of "institutions not of men". The 1938 Constitution (including modifications made by the Constituent Assembly in 1945) was to be respected, the call for new elections was reiterated, and broad amnesty for all those implicated in the previous days events was declared.

Finally on 24 July, representatives of the workers, students, and teachers were admitted into the junta. Officially, all important decisions were to be decided as a unified body and no cabinet was officially formed, though de facto the members of the junta were all assigned various ministerial portfolios. Representing the UMSA was Luis Gosalvez Indaburu as minister of finance while Dr. Aniceto Solares represented the teachers as minister of education and foreign affairs. Aurelio Alcoba, the Secretary-General of the Trade Union Confederation of Bolivian Workers, was appointed to represent organized labor as minister of work. Cabrera García was to occupy the ministry of government while Guillén, along with being president of the junta, would be the minister of defense. A third unnamed judge was intended to occupy the agriculture and public works portfolios though ultimately those offices were assigned to Guillén and Cabrera García respectively. The lawyer and professor Roberto Bilbao la Vieja was also appointed as a member of the junta, later becoming its secretary-general on 6 August.

=== Junta under Monje ===
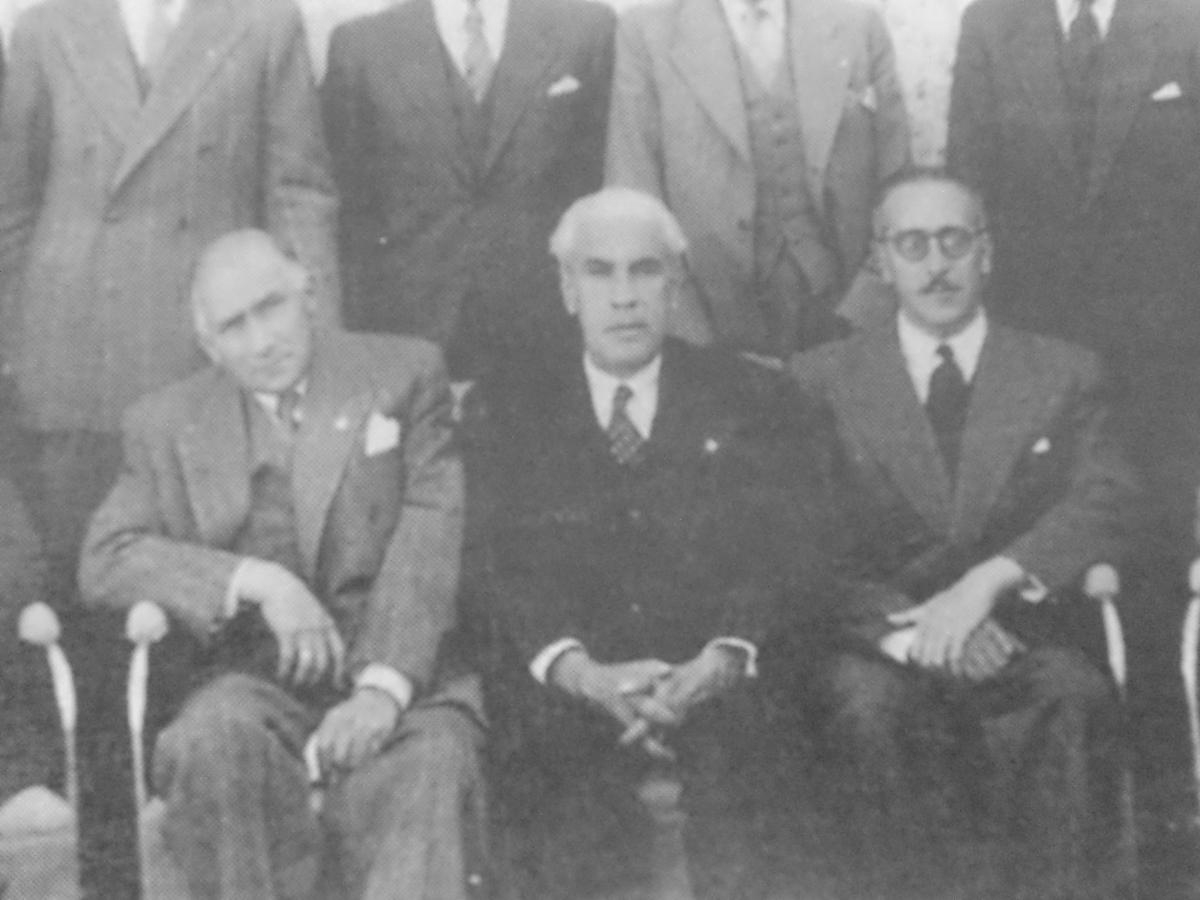
President Tomás Monje (center) with other members of the junta in late 1946

Néstor Guillén's 27-day mandate ended on 17 August 1946 when Tomás Monje arrived to chair the junta. On 26 August, Monje formed a ministerial cabinet separate from the government junta. The judges Guillén and Cabrera García stepped down. Gosalvez Indaburu was replaced as minister of finance by Eduardo Saenz García but remained a member of the junta. Solares and Alcoba maintained their positions on the junta as well as their ministerial offices.

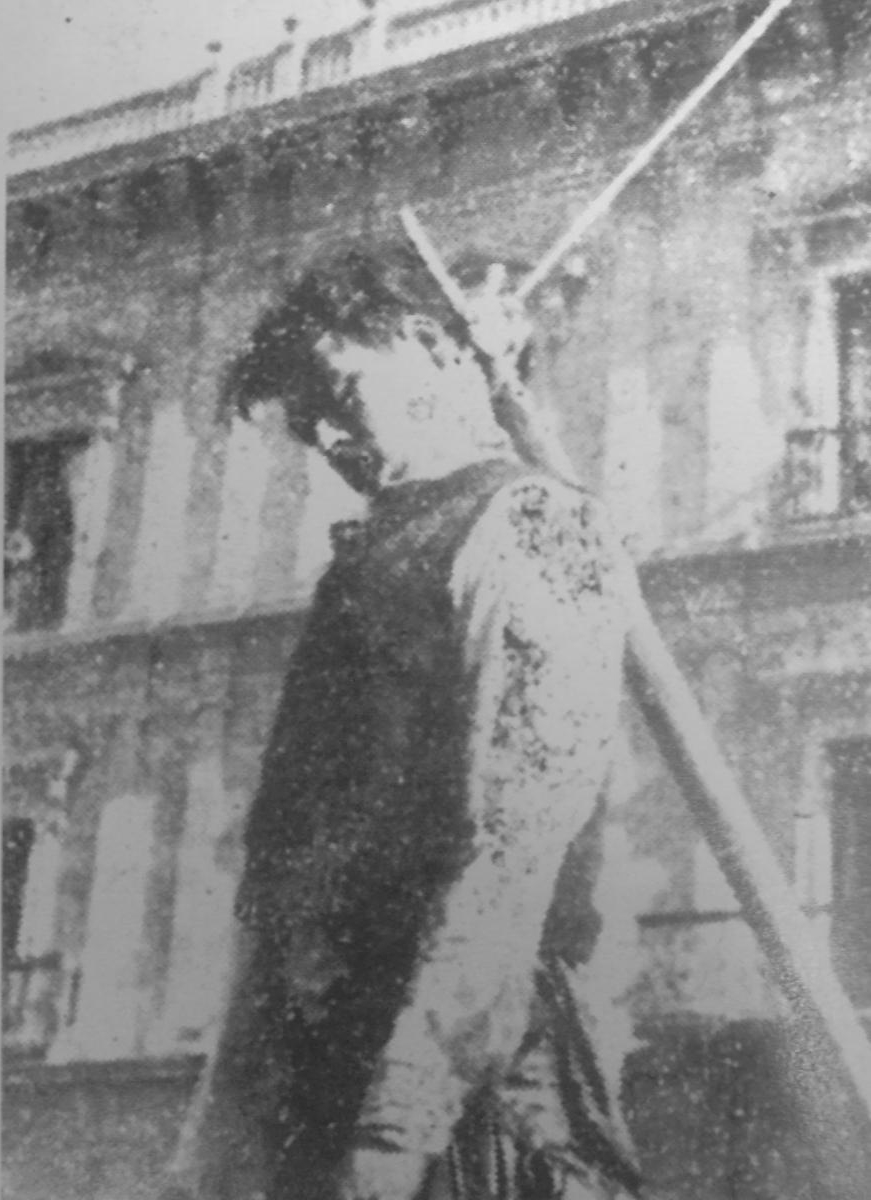
The body of one of the victims of the riot hanging on a Plaza Murillo lamppost

==== 27 September riot ====
Just over a month into Monje's mandate, an incident occurred which highlighted the still tense political climate of the time. On 27 September, a disgruntled and visibly mentally disturbed retired army lieutenant by the name of Luis Oblitas entered the Palacio Quemado seeking an audience with the president in order to request his reinstatement in the ranks of the armed forces. After waiting unattended in the anteroom for some time, Oblitas stormed into the president's office where Monje was with his public works minister Carlos Muñóz Roldán and demanded that his request be immediately heard. After clubbing the president's secretary, the officer levelled his gun at Monje shouting either "Now, I will be president! Because I have the conditions to be!" or "I'm going to be president". Reportedly showing no fear, Monje confronted the officer and challenged him to "Fire," unbuttoning his vest and spreading his arms while also stating that "I am here by the will of the people". Oblitas was then disarmed by palace guards and taken into custody at the panopticon of San Pedro.

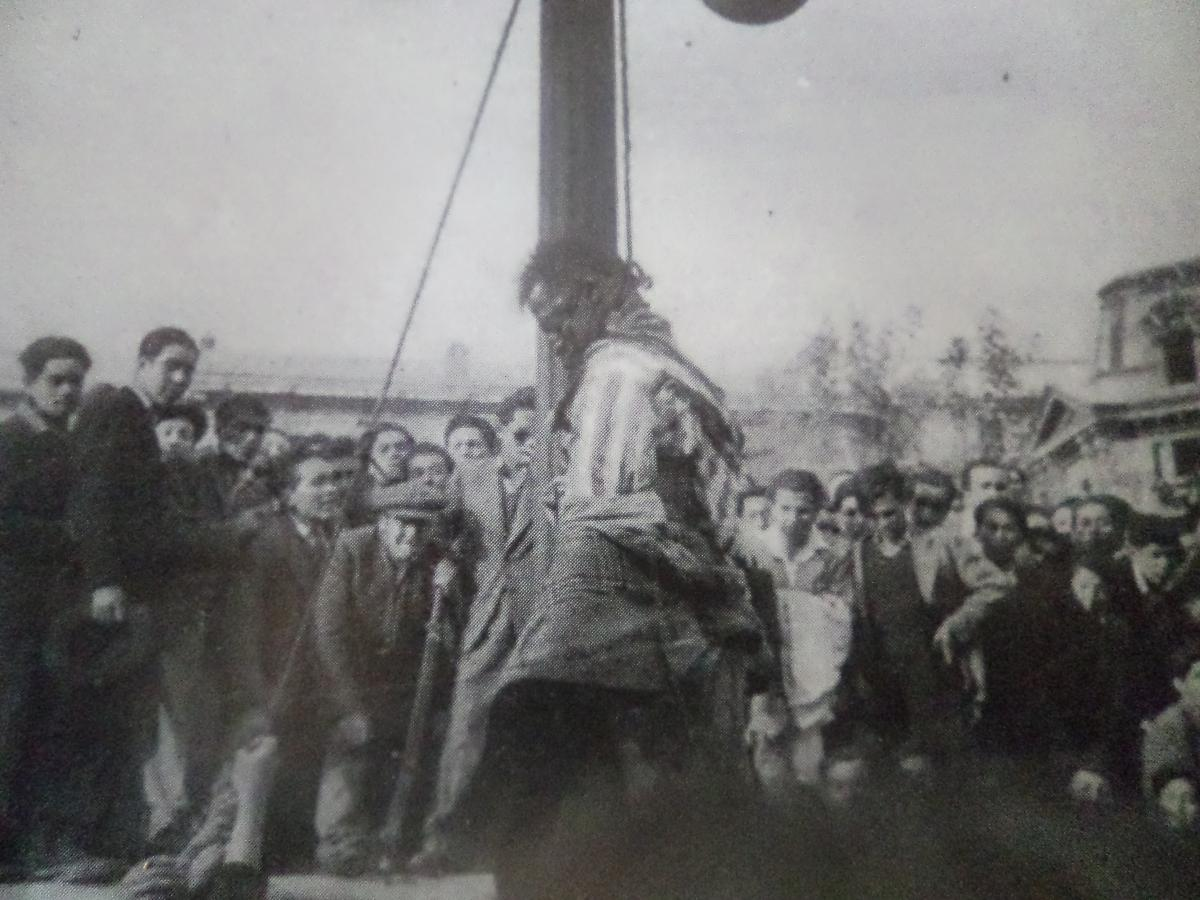
The lynching of one of the officers in the Plaza Murillo

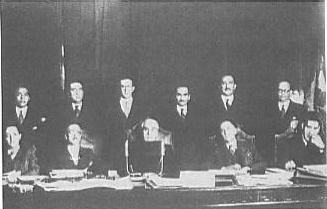
The members of the junta in 1947

Once local press reported news of the attempt on the president's life, a crowd began to gather at the Plaza Murillo which soon swelled to some 80,000 people. Eventually, rumors that the incident had been a conspiracy by the RADEPA and MNR to regain power caused the crowd to grow agitated leading to a mob forcing their way into the prison. Oblitas was dragged out of his cell and into the plaza where he was shot dead by Carlos Meyer before being hung on one of the lampposts in a manner similar to the fates suffered by Villarroel and others just months prior. Unsatisfied, the mob then turned their attention to Captain José Escobar and Major Jorge Eguino who were also imprisoned in the panopticon awaiting trial for their role in the 1944 Chuspipata massacre during the Villarroel regime. Eguino and Escobar, who at the time was with his six-year-old son, were beaten and dragged to the Plaza Murillo. Escobar, who at that point was already dead or dying, was the first of the two to be hanged. Eguino, however, first requested a Confessor, a Coca-Cola, and time to make denunciations. The first two requests, but not the third, were granted and Eguino was then also hanged. However, when the rope was cut it was found that Eguino was still alive and he was instead shot twice before his corpse was re-hoisted onto another lamppost.

Though Monje attempted to calm the mob from the palace balcony stating that "my life is unimportant," his calls were ignored and the crowd turned its attention to the embassies where many members of the previous government had taken refuge. At that moment however, a weather event occurred which the writer Luis Antezana Ergueta described: "Another terrifying thunder, and another right away. Suddenly, the sky was powerfully illuminated with an electric blue discharge and from the clouds that collided at less than a thousand meters high, a powerful beam zigzagged towards the plaza of the hanged and rushed in the middle of the place where the immolated ones hung on that date. The crowd began to flee everywhere. The divine sword of lightning fell exactly in the middle of the three corpses that, like sinister pendulums, appeared hanging from the lanterns [...]" The lightning caused city lights to go out for 10 to 15 seconds and caused the superstitious crowd to panic and disperse amid cries claiming that "The voice of God—it is God punishing us".

==== General elections ====
Shortly after the riot on 15 October 1946, Monje promulgated Supreme Decree No. 579 which called for general elections to be held on 5 January 1947. On the date of the election, Enrique Hertzog of the Republican Socialist Unity Party narrowly defeated the Liberal Luis Fernando Guachalla by margin of just 443 votes. The elected National Congress was set to formally meet on 2 March while the inauguration of the elected president was set for 10 March. On that date, the Honorable Government Junta ceased to exist and the mandate of Tomás Monje came to an end. While Monje retired from public life, Néstor Guillén briefly served as Minister of Defense in the Cabinet of Enrique Hertzog before also retiring.

== Members ==
Junta President

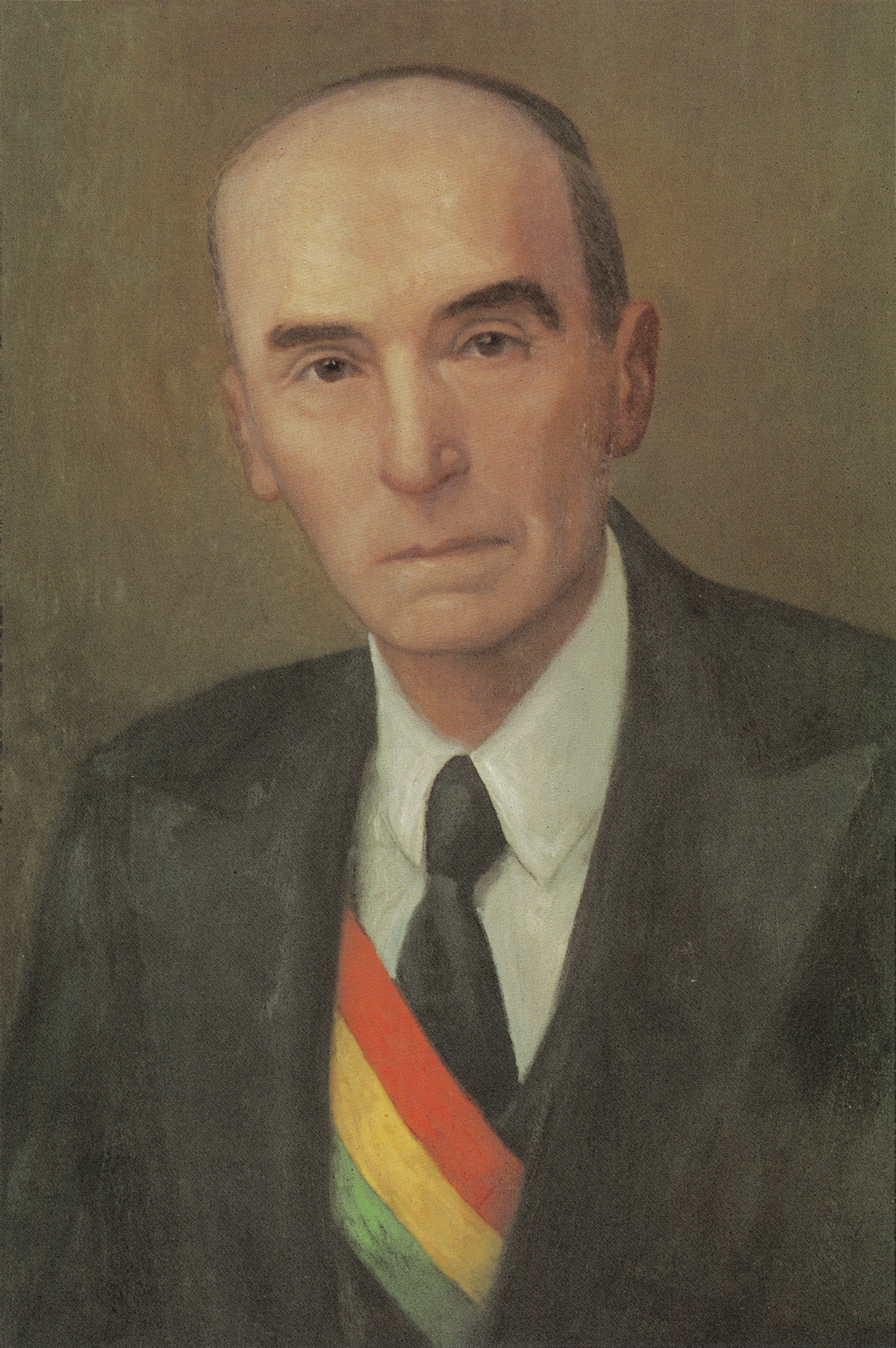
Néstor Guillén,
from 21 July 1946

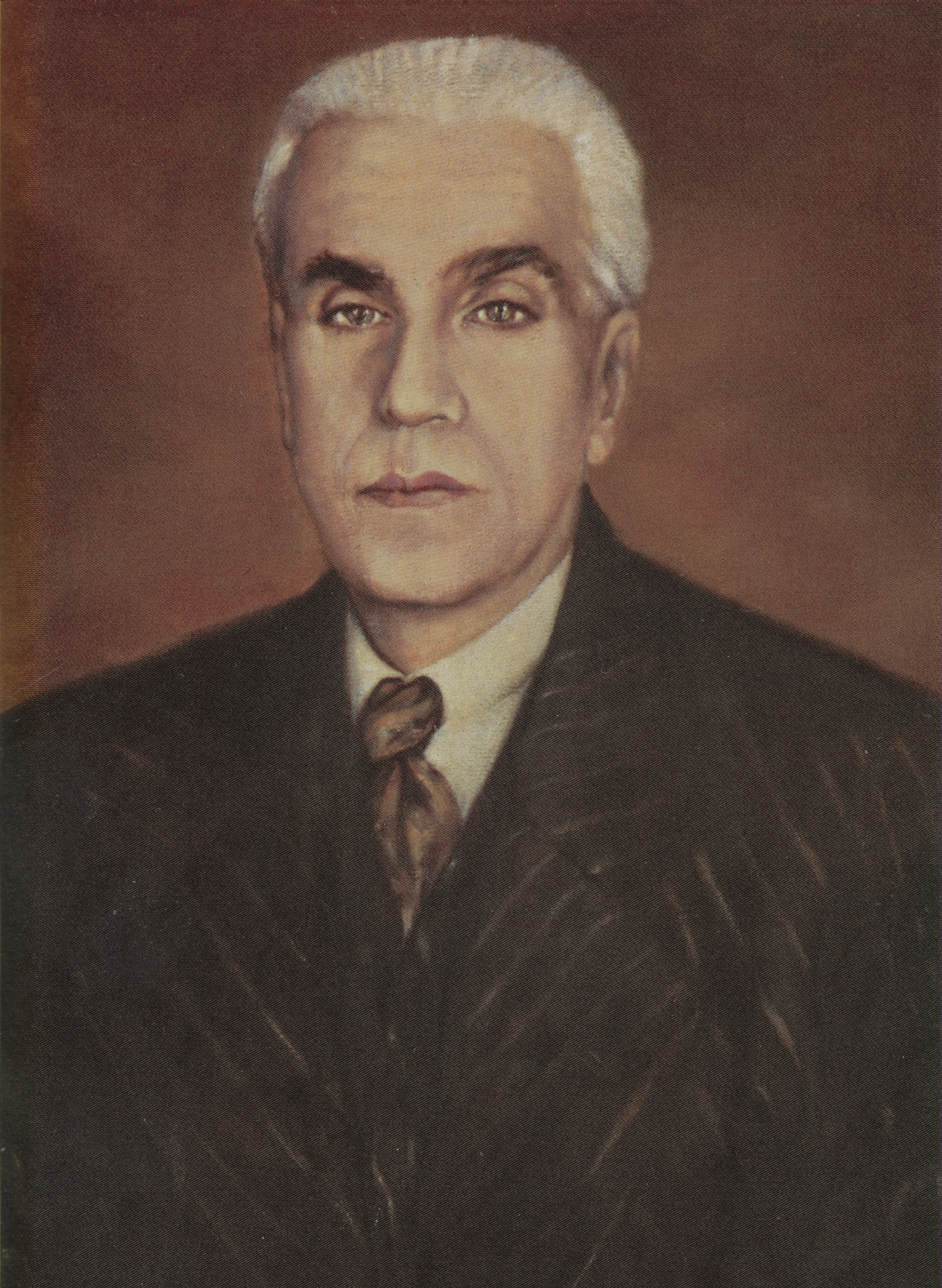
Tomás Monje,
from 17 August 1946

Secretary-General

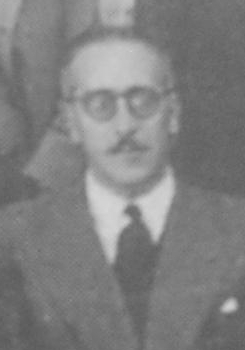
Roberto Bilbao la Vieja

Honorable Government Junta of Bolivia 1946–1947
Members of the Superior Court of Justice of the judicial district of La Paz
Office		Member	Party	Position	Term	Days
President		Néstor Guillén	Ind.	Superior District; Court Dean	21 July 1946 – 22 July 1946	1
Magistrate		Cleto Cabrera García	Ind.	Superior District; Court Judge	21 July 1946 – 22 July 1946	1
Magistrate		Juan Armaza Ribert	Ind.	Superior District; Court Judge	21 July 1946 – 22 July 1946	1
Magistrate		Carlos Pacheco Núñez	Ind.	Superior District; Court Judge	21 July 1946 – 22 July 1946	1
Magistrate		Pacífico Ledezma	Ind.	Superior District; Court Judge	21 July 1946 – 22 July 1946	1
Magistrate		Daniel Guisbert	Ind.	Superior District; Court Judge	21 July 1946 – 22 July 1946	1
Members of the Government Junta
Office		Member	Party	Representing	Term	Days
President		Néstor Guillén	Ind.	Superior District; Court Dean	22 July 1946 – 24 July 1946	2
Magistrate		Cleto Cabrera García	Ind.	Superior District; Court of La Paz	22 July 1946 – 24 July 1946	2
Secretary-General of the Junta		Raúl Calvimontes	–	Civilian sector	22 July 1946 – 24 July 1946	2
None		Carlos Montaño Daza	–	Civilian sector	22 July 1946 – 24 July 1946	2
Members of the provisional Government Junta
Office		Member	Party	Representing	Term	Days
President		Néstor Guillén	Ind.	Superior District; Court Dean	24 July 1946 – 17 August 1946	24
President		Tomás Monje	Ind.	Superior District; Court President	17 August 1946 – 10 March 1947	205
None		Roberto Bilbao la Vieja	–	Civilian sector	24 July 1946 – 6 August 1946	13
Secretary-General of the Junta		Roberto Bilbao la Vieja	–	Civilian sector	6 August 1946 – 10 March 1947	216
Minister of Government	Minister of Public Works	Cleto Cabrera García	Ind.	Superior District; Court of La Paz	24 July 1946 – 26 August 1946	33
Minister of Defense	Minister of Agriculture	Néstor Guillén	Ind.	Superior District; Court of La Paz	24 July 1946 – 26 August 1946	33
Minister of Finance		Luis Gosalvez Indaburu	–	Higher University of San Andrés	24 July 1946 – 26 August 1946	33
None		Luis Gosalvez Indaburu	–	Higher University of San Andrés	26 August 1946 – 10 March 1947	196
Minister of Education		Aniceto Solares	PRG	Teachers' Confederation	24 July 1946 – 26 August 1946	33
Minister of Foreign Affairs		Aniceto Solares	PRG	Teachers' Confederation	24 July 1946 – 7 March 1947	226
Minister of Work		Aurelio Alcoba	PIR	Trade Union Confederation of Bolivian Workers	24 July 1946 – 10 March 1947	229

== See also ==
- Cabinet of Néstor Guillén
- Cabinet of Tomás Monje

== Bibliography ==
- Gisbert, Carlos D. Mesa (2003). Presidentes de Bolivia: entre urnas y fusiles : el poder ejecutivo, los ministros de estado (in Spanish). Editorial Gisbert.
