= Adolfo Costa du Rels =

Bolivian diplomat

Ambassador of Bolivia to France
- In office 12 July 1949 – 14 October 1954
- President: Mamerto Urriolagoitía; Hugo Ballivián; Víctor Paz Estenssoro
- Preceded by: Jorge Ortiz Linares
- Succeeded by: Adrián Barrenechea Torrés

Ambassador of Bolivia to Argentina
- In office 1943–1947
- President: Gualberto Villarroel; Néstor Guillén; Tomás Monje
- Preceded by: Tomás Manuel Elío
- Succeeded by: Gabriel Gosálvez

Minister of Foreign Affairs and Worship
- In office 1 March 1948 – 9 August 1948
- President: Enrique Hertzog
- Preceded by: Tomás Manuel Elío
- Succeeded by: Javier Paz Campero

Personal details
- Born: 19 June 1891 Sucre, Bolivia
- Died: 26 May 1980 (aged 88) La Paz, Bolivia

Adolfo Costa du Rels (or Adolfo Costa du Reís; 19 June 1891 – 26 May 1980) was a Bolivian writer and diplomat who became the last President of the Council of the League of Nations. He was the author of many plays, novels, and other writings, mostly in French, and received several literary awards.

== Early years ==
Adolfo Costa du Rels was born in Sucre in 1891. His father was a French engineer from Corsica; his mother, Amelia du Reís y Medeiros, was Bolivian. The family returned to Corsica when he was eight years old. At the age of ten, he was sent to the Fesch College in Ajaccio, Corsica. Later he studied at the University of Aix-en-Provence, and then studied literature and law at the University of Paris-Sorbonne. Writing in Spanish, in his 1941 essay El drama del escritor bilingüe [The drama of the bilingual writer] Costa du Rels described the "linguistic trauma" that resulted from being a native Spanish-speaker educated in French.

Costa du Rels returned to Bolivia in 1912. Oil had been discovered in the Bolivian Oriente, and prospecting and speculation were at their height. A member of the Sucre elite, he obtained grants to explore petroleum in the region and spent several years in the effort, becoming one of the richest petroleum operators in the country. In 1914 he became secretary of the Incauasi Petroleum Syndicate, and by 1916 he owned claims for a combined area of 500,000 hectares (1,200,000 acres). Later he used these experiences to provide background for his novel Tierra hechizadas [Bewitched Lands].

== Diplomat ==
Costa du Rels entered the diplomatic service in 1917 and was attached to the Bolivian embassy in France. He was then appointed Bolivian chargé d'affaires in Chile. He was elected a deputy in the Bolivian government for a period, then became a counsellor to the Bolivian embassy in France. In 1928 he was the Bolivian delegate to the Pan-American Conference in Havana, where he was rapporteur of the Havana Convention for the protection of artistic property and copyright, and then was a Bolivian delegate to the International Institute for Intellectual Cooperation.

Costa du Rels was appointed Bolivian delegate to the Geneva-based Assembly of the League of Nations, and in 1930 was vice-president of the 11th Assembly of the league. He was appointed a member of the Standing Committee of Arts and Letters in 1931. In January 1927 the Bolivian government adhered to the Geneva Convention's protocol on the trafficking of opium and other harmful drugs, with reservations concerning coca, a relatively mild drug (in its leaf form) that had been used for centuries by the local people. These reservations were incorporated into Bolivian law in 1932. Costa du Rels was provided with many pamphlets on coca to help him defend the Bolivian position at the League of Nations. In 1933 he sought "advice from industrialists and landowners of the Yungas" on new steps to protect coca. The arguments in defense included the economic importance of the crop, its value in health and nutrition, and the fact that its use was a long tradition among Bolivians.

=== Chaco war ===
In July 1932 an ongoing dispute between Bolivia and Paraguay over the Gran Chaco territory escalated into armed conflict. In September of that year the League of Nations set up a three-person committee with delegates from Ireland, Spain, and Guatemala to investigate the conflict and if necessary prepare for intervention. The committee head, Seán Lester, attempted without success to resolve the positions of two countries' delegates to the League, Costa du Rels and Ramón Caballero de Bedoya of Paraguay.

In June 1933 Costa du Rels wrote to the Secretary General of the League of Nations pointing out the great military importance of Puerto Casado, a port on the Paraguay River, which was being used as a base for Paraguayan troops and as a point of supply for these troops. He justified Bolivia's aerial bombardment of the town on this basis, while denying that Bolivia had attacked agricultural settlements. He represented to the League that the territory had belonged to Bolivia since 1810, but that Paraguay had been surreptitiously occupying the region, taking advantage of her favorable geographical position. He called for arbitration to establish the boundaries.

The war continued with heavy loss of life on both sides for two years. In the end, when a cease-fire was negotiated between the two exhausted countries in June 1935, Paraguay controlled most of the disputed territory. In the 1938 truce, Paraguay was awarded three-quarters of the Chaco Boreal. Ironically, since the war had been fought over suspected oil and gas reserves, it turned out later that there were none in the Paraguayan sector while the Bolivian quarter was rich in these resources.

=== World War II ===
Costa du Rels was appointed Minister Plenipotentiary to Switzerland and the Vatican between 1937 and 1943. World War II broke out in 1939 and would last until 1945. In 1940 Costa du Rels became President of the Council of the League of Nations, the last to hold this post. The League was dissolved after World War II and replaced by the United Nations. In July 1940, Costa du Rels supported the appointment of Seán Lester as Secretary-General of the League, a diplomat with whom he had negotiated during the Gran Chaco conflict. Costa du Rels was Ambassador of Bolivia to Argentina between 1943 and 1944.

=== Post-war ===
On 10 January 1946 Costa du Rels attended a meeting of the United Nations General Assembly for discussions on disposing of the assets of the League of Nations, of which he was still technically President. Costa du Rels was Minister of Foreign Affairs and Public Worship in Bolivia in 1948. In that position he attempted without success to obtain support from the United States for raising the price paid for Bolivian tin, which had been fixed at a relatively low level but for which there was now a shortage of supply. Between 1948 and 1952 Costa du Rels was Bolivian Ambassador to France. In 1973 he served as Bolivian Ambassador to UNESCO. For much of his life, Costa du Rels made his home in Paris. According to the Duchesse de la Rochefoucauld, Costa du Rels had the right to say of himself, as had Joseph de Maistre, "No foreigner is more French than me." Costa du Rels died in La Paz in 1980.

== Literary work and recognition ==
Costa du Rels wrote in both French and Spanish. He wrote poetry, plays, novels, short stories, and essays. His play Les étendards du roi (The King's Standards) was staged in Paris in 1956. The Spanish version, Los estandartes del rey, was performed in La Paz in 1968. The play was awarded the Gulbenkian Prize in 1972, an award given to the best dramatists in the Latin world. Among his other well-known plays are Les Forces du Silence (The Forces of Silence), staged in 1944 in Buenos Aires, El signo del fuego (The Sign of Fire) (1957), and El quinto jinete (The Fifth Horseman) (1963). His essay Los cruzados de alta mar (Deep sea crossings) won the Prix Rivarol in Paris in 1954. It described his farewell to Paris in May 1940.

Some of his stories such as La Misk'isimi (Quechua misk'i sweet, honey, simi mouth, word, language) explored indigenous Bolivian themes. This story appeared in the French-language 1928 collection La hantise de l'or [The spell of gold], published in 1948 in Spanish as El embrujo del oro. This story and another from the same book, Plata del Diablo [The Devil's Silver], which tells of prospecting in the Andes, were freely combined with his 1973 novel Los Andes no Creen en Dios [The Andes Do not Believe in God] to form the basis for a 2007 film Los Andes no creen en Dios starring Diego Bertie and Carla Ortiz.

Costa du Rels was given many awards, including the National Culture Award in 1975, the National Prize for Literature in 1976 and the Grand Cross of the Order of the Condor of the Andes. He was made an officer of the French Legion of Honour, and was a member of the academies of History of Argentina and Bolivia. He was a member of the Bolivian Academy of Literature. Guillermo Francovich said of him that although he wrote in French he was essentially a Bolivian writer, and his most characteristic works were devoted to Bolivian issues. In 1973, he was nominated for the Nobel Prize in Literature by the chairman of Bolivian P.E.N.-Centre, Humberto Palza (1900–1975).

== Bibliography ==
Poetry

- Le sourire návre (The heart-broken smile) (French, 1922)
- Amaritudine (Grand prize for international poetry from the society of French poets, 1949)
- Poemas (Poems) (Spanish, 1988)

Theater

- Hacia el atardecer [Towards evening] (in Spanish). 1919.
- La hantise de l'or [The spell of gold] (in French). 1928.
- Las fuerzas del mal [The forces of evil] (in Spanish). 1940.
- Les forces du silence [The forces of silence] (in French). 1944.
- Les étendards du roi: pièce en trois actes [The king's standards] (in French). Plon. 1956.
- The king's standards: a play in three acts. S. French. 1958. p. 72.

Stories

- El traje del arlequín [The harlequin's suit] (in Spanish). Co-author. 1921.
- "Lagune H. 3: récit". La Petite Illustration (869). Paris France. 1938.
- El embrujo del oro [The spell of gold] (in Spanish). 1948.

Novels

- "Terres embrasées: roman" [Bewitched lands]. Petite Illustration (in French) (233–235). Paris France. 1931.
- Tierras hechizadas [Bewitched lands] (in Spanish). Club del libro A.L.A. 1940. p. 221.
- Bewitched lands. trans. by Stuart Edgar Grummon. A. A. Knopf. 1945. p. 203.
- La Laguna H. 3 (in Spanish). trans. by Nicolás Fernández Naranjo. 1967. p. 219.
- Los Andes no creen en Dios [The Andes do not believe in God] (in Spanish). 1973.

Essays

- Problèmes d'une paix: Documents diplomatiques sur le conflit du Chaco [Problems of Peace: Diplomatic documents on the Chaco conflict] (in French). J. Guerry. 1933. p. 76.
- El drama del escritor bilingüe [The drama of the bilingual writer] (in Spanish). 1941.
- Los cruzados de alta mar [Deep sea crossings] (in Spanish). 1954.

Political offices
Preceded by Tomás Manuel Elío	Minister of Foreign Affairs and Worship; 1948	Succeeded by Javier Paz Campero
Diplomatic posts
Preceded by Tomás Manuel Elío	Ambassador of Bolivia to Argentina; 1943–1947	Succeeded by Gabriel Gosálvez
Preceded by Jorge Ortiz Linares	Ambassador of Bolivia to France; 1949–1954	Succeeded by Adrián Barrenechea Torrés
