= Cabinet of Néstor Guillén =

Bolivian presidential administration and ministerial cabinet in 1946

Guillén cabinet
- 112th Cabinet of the Republic of Bolivia
- 1946
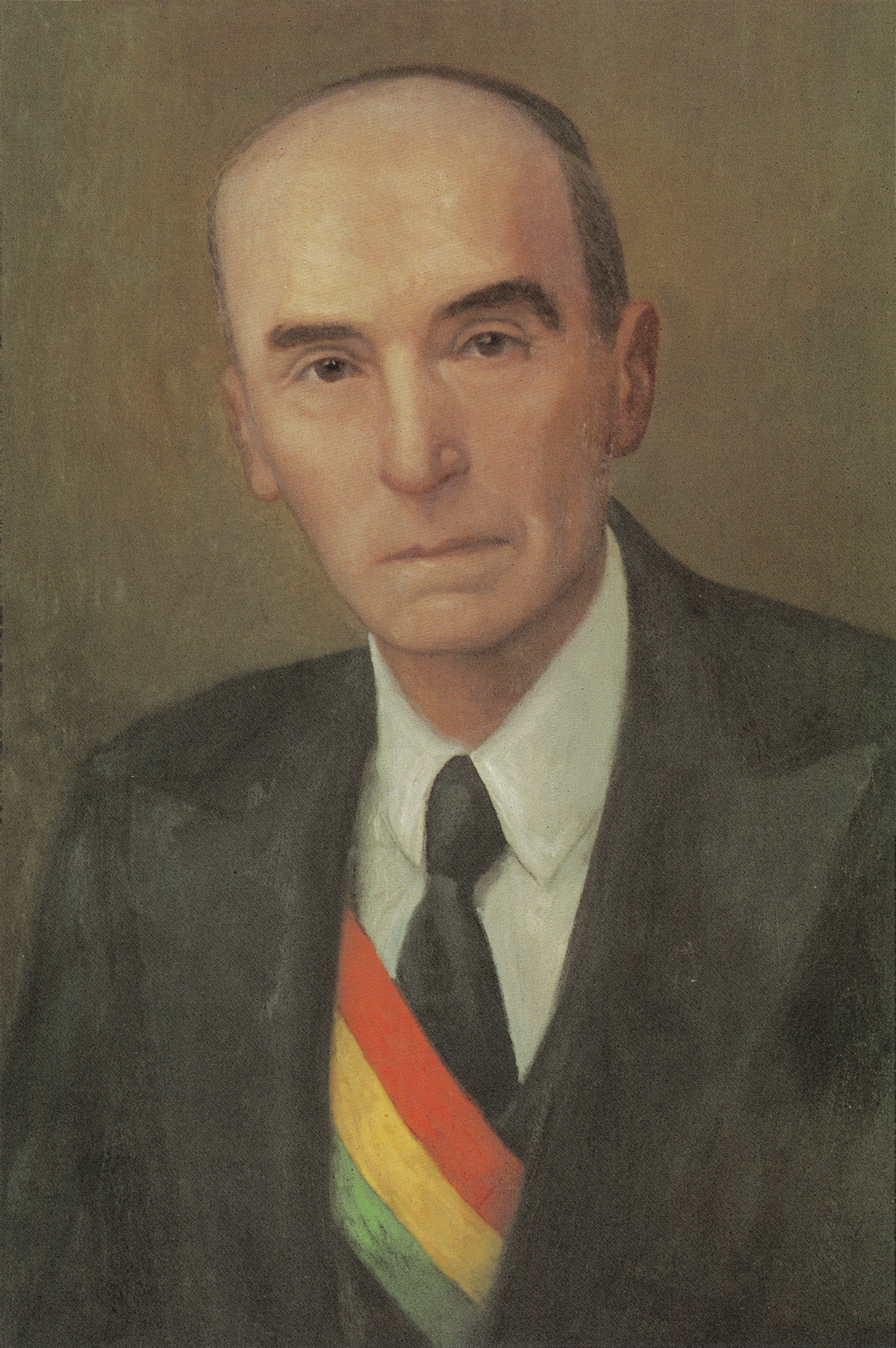
- Date formed: 21 July 1946
- Date dissolved: 17 August 1946

People and organisations
- President: Néstor Guillén
- Vice President: Vacant
- No. of ministers: 6 (on 17 August 1946)
- Member party: Caretaker government

History
- Predecessor: Cabinet of Gualberto Villarroel
- Successor: Cabinet of Tomás Monje (interim)

Néstor Guillén assumed office as the interim 40th President of Bolivia on 21 July 1946, and his mandate ended on 17 August 1946. A magistrate of the Superior District Court of La Paz, Guillén was chosen to lead an interim junta in the absence of the President of the District Court Tomás Monje, who was ill at the time, in the wake of the violent demise of President Gualberto Villarroel.

Guillén formed one cabinet three days after taking office, constituting the 112th national cabinet of Bolivia as part of the 1946–1947 Government Junta.

== Cabinet Ministers ==
Cabinet of Bolivia Interim Presidency of Néstor Guillén, 1946
Office		Minister	Party	Prof.	Term	Days	N.C (Note: Denoting which national cabinet the minister was originally a part of.)	P.C (Note: Denoting which presidential cabinet the minister was originally a part of.)
President		Néstor Guillén	Ind.	Law.	21 July 1946 – 17 August 1946	27	–	–
Vice President		Office vacant throughout presidency					–	–
Secretary-General of the Junta		Office blank 21 July 1946 – 6 August 1946						
Secretary-General of the Junta		Roberto Bilbao la Vieja	–	Law.	6 August 1946 – 10 March 1947	216	112	1 (Note: Held over into the Monje cabinet.)
Minister of Foreign Affairs and Worship (Chancellor)	Minister of Education and Indigenous Affairs	Aniceto Solares	PRG	Dip.	24 July 1946 – 7 March 1947	226	112	1
Minister of Government and Justice	Minister of Public Works and Communications	Cleto Cabrera García	–	Mag.	24 July 1946 – 26 August 1946	33	112	1
Minister of National Defense	Minister of Agriculture, Livestock, and Colonization	Néstor Guillén	Ind.	Law.	24 July 1946 – 26 August 1946	33	112	1
Minister of Finance, Statistics, and Economy		Luis Gosalvez Indaburu	–	–	24 July 1946 – 26 August 1946	33	112	1
Minister of Work, Health, and Social Security		Aurelio Alcoba	PIR	Uni.	24 July 1946 – 10 March 1947	229	112	1

== Composition ==
On 24 July 1946, the civil junta which made up Néstor Guillén's cabinet was expanded to include representatives from the labor, student, and magistrate sectors. Minister of Finance Luis Gosalvez Indaburu, a partner in the law firm employed by Moritz Hochschild, would represent the universities while Foreign Minister Aniceto Solares would represent the teachers. Aurelio Alcoba, the Secretary-General of the Trade Union Confederation of Bolivian Workers, was appointed Minister of Work and Social Security as the representative of the worker's unions. Roberto Bilbao la Vieja, employed by the Asociacion de Industriales Mineros (Association of Mining Industrialists, a legal entity of the three tin magnates), was made Secretary-General.

Many of the members of the junta held multiple cabinet positions, including Guillén himself who in addition to being president was Minister of Defense and Minister of Agriculture. On 17 August, Tomás Monje assumed command of the junta. All of the members of Guillén's cabinet remained in office until Monje appointed his own ministers on 26 August. Alcoba, Solares, and Bilbao la Vieja would remain in their positions until the end of Monje's mandate.

== Gallery ==
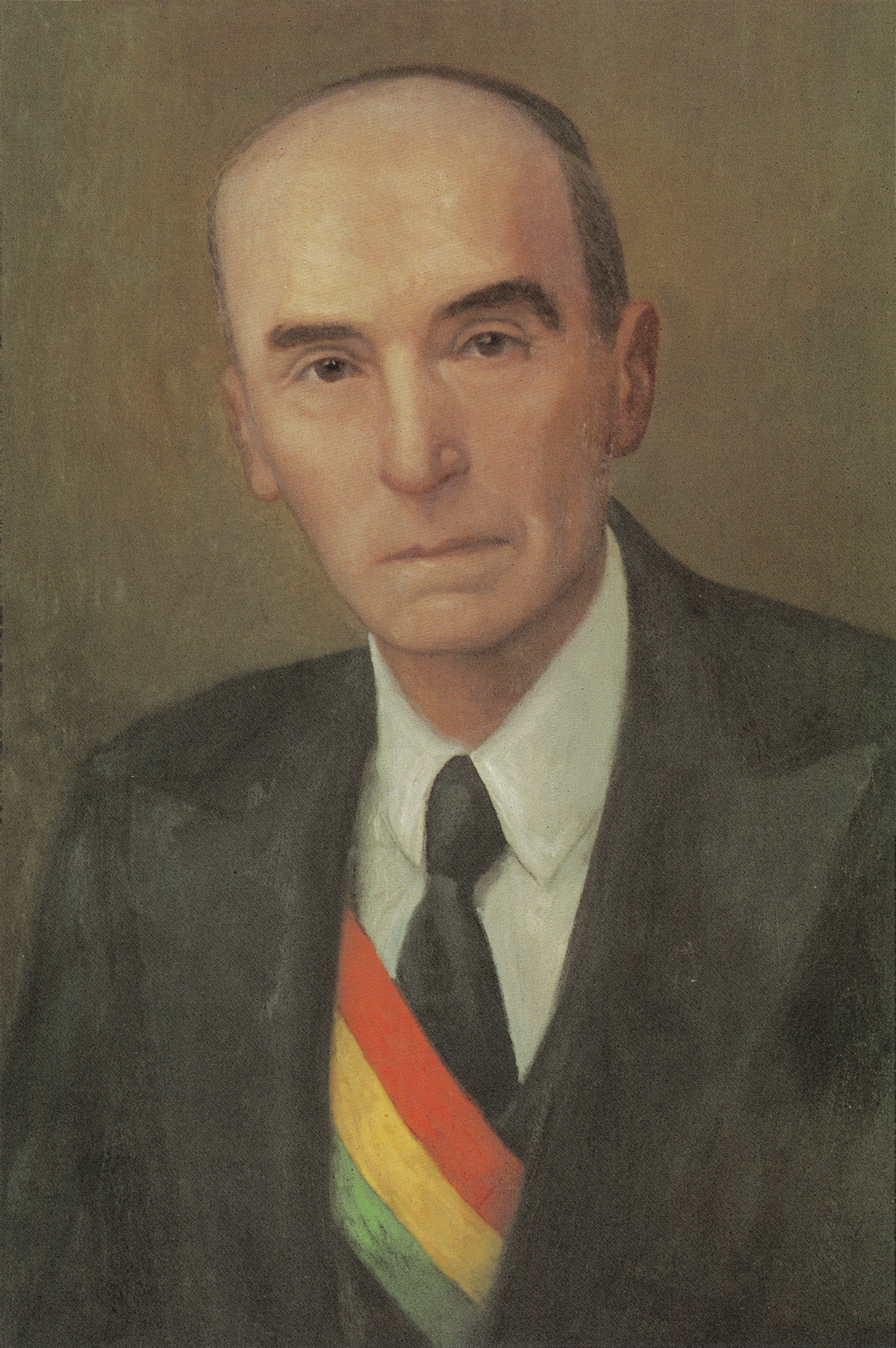
Néstor Guillén –
Interim President, Minister of National Defense, and Minister of Agriculture

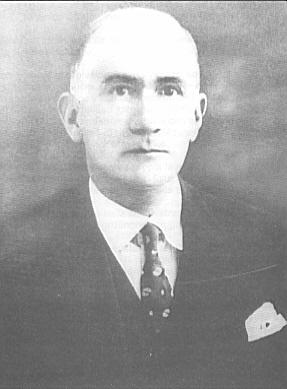
Aniceto Solares –
Minister of Foreign Affairs and Minister of Education (PRG)

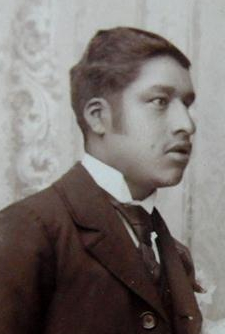
Aurelio Alcoba –
Minister of Work and Health (PIR)

== Bibliography ==
- Gisbert, Carlos D. Mesa (2003). Presidentes de Bolivia: entre urnas y fusiles : el poder ejecutivo, los ministros de estado (in Spanish). Editorial Gisbert.
