= Democratic Institutionalist Alliance =

Political alliance in Bolivia

The Democratic Institutionalist Alliance (Spanish: Alianza Institucionalista Democrática, AID) was an electoral political alliance of the Liberal Party (PL) and the Republican Socialist Unity Party (PURS).

The Democratic Institutionalist Alliance was established in 1966, for the 1966 presidential and congressional elections. It presented as its presidential candidate Enrique Hertzog Garaizabal (PURS) and Eduardo Montes y Montes (PL), as vice-presidential candidate.
