= Néstor Guillén =

President of Bolivia from July to August 1946

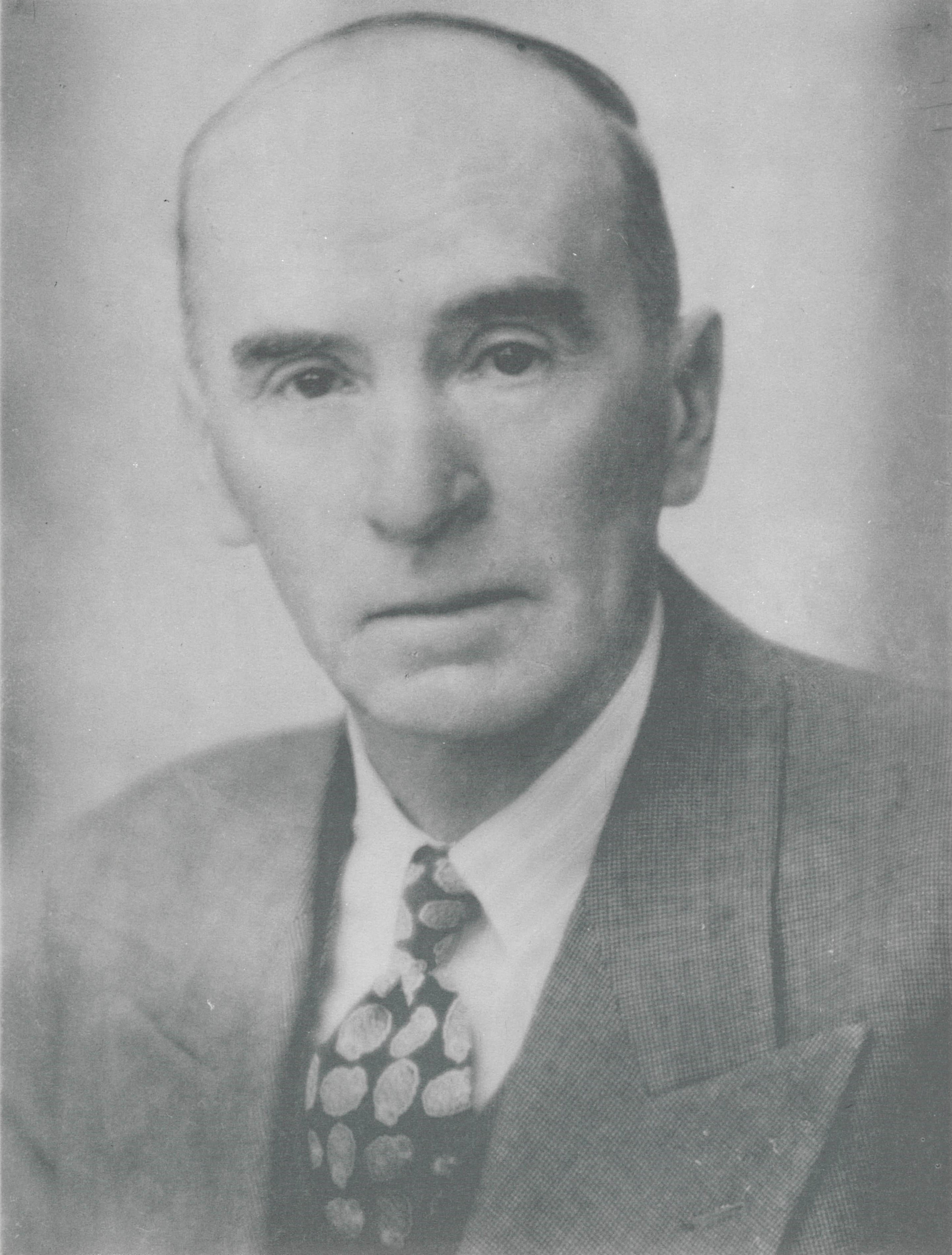
- Portrait of Guillén, 1953

40th President of Bolivia
- In office 21 July 1946 – 17 August 1946
- Vice President: Vacant
- Preceded by: Gualberto Villarroel
- Succeeded by: Tomás Monje
Other offices
President of the Government Junta
In office 21 July 1946 – 17 August 1946
| Preceded by | Office established |
| Succeeded by | Tomás Monje |
Minister of National Defense
In office 10 March 1947 – 14 May 1947
| President | Enrique Hertzog |
| Preceded by | Julio César Canelas |
| Succeeded by | Eduardo Montes y Montes |
In office 24 July 1946 – 26 August 1946
| President | Himself; Tomás Monje |
| Preceded by | José Celestino Pinto |
| Succeeded by | Julio César Canelas |
Minister of Agriculture, Livestock, and Colonization
In office 24 July 1946 – 26 August 1946
| President | Himself; Tomás Monje |
| Preceded by | Julio Zuazo |
| Succeeded by | José Saavedra |

Personal details
- Born: Néstor Guillén Olmos; 28 January 1890 La Paz, Bolivia
- Died: 12 March 1966 (aged 76) La Paz, Bolivia
- Spouse: Laura Solares
- Parents: Manuel C. Guillén; María Olmos
- Occupation: Judge; lawyer; politician

Néstor Guillén Olmos (28 January 1890 – 12 March 1966) was a Bolivian judge, lawyer, and politician who served as the 40th president of Bolivia from July to August 1946.

== Background and earlier career ==
Born in La Paz, Guillén studied law and rose to become the dean of the Superior District Court of La Paz.

== President of Bolivia ==
Néstor Guillén served as President of Bolivia for 27 days between July and August 1946, following the overthrow and assassination of President Gualberto Villarroel (1943–46). Upon the death of Villarroel, the alliance of forces that had toppled him needed a reliable and impartial caretaker (given the mood of the citizenry, which had just shown what it was capable of during the revolt) to guide the country to elections. They settled on the head of the La Paz Court of Appeals, Tomás Monje, who was ill at the time. Thus, Guillén filled in for him for fewer than four weeks, whereupon Monje was sworn in as president. The old oligarchy was established again but, not long after, would fall only a few years later.

== Later career and death ==
Guillén then returned to his judgeship and died on 12 March 1966 in La Paz.

== See also ==
- Cabinet of Néstor Guillén

== Sources ==
- Mesa José de; Gisbert, Teresa; and Carlos D. Mesa, "Historia De Bolivia", 3rd edition., pp. 577–578.

Political offices
| Preceded by Julio Zuazo | Minister of Agriculture, Livestock, and Colonization; 1946 | Succeeded by José Saavedra |
| Preceded by José Celestino Pinto | Minister of National Defense; 1946 | Succeeded by Julio César Canelas |
| Preceded by Gualberto Villarroel | President of Bolivia; 1946 | Succeeded by Tomás Monje |
| Preceded by Julio César Canelas | Minister of National Defense; 1947 | Succeeded by Eduardo Montes y Montes |
Government offices
| Office established | President of the Government Junta; 1946 | Succeeded by Tomás Monje |
