= 1949 Bolivian legislative election =

Parliamentary elections in Bolivia

Parliamentary elections were held in Bolivia on 1 May 1949, electing half the seats of the Chamber of Deputies and one-third the seats in the Senate.

== Results ==
Party	Votes	%	Seats					
Party	Votes	%	Chamber			Senate		
Party	Votes	%	Elected	Total	+/–	Elected	Total	+/–
Republican Socialist Unity Party			28	56	+11	6	14	0
Revolutionary Nationalist Movement			9	9	+5	1	1	0
Revolutionary Left Party			5	21	–15	2	4	0
Liberal Party			2	9	–7	0	6	–1
Social Democratic Party			1	2	0	0	0	0
Bolivian Socialist Falange			1	1	0	0	0	0
Others			10	13	–	0	2	–
Total			56	111	0	9	27	0
Source: New International Year Book, Political Handbook of the World
