= Enrique Hertzog =

President of Bolivia from 1947 to 1949

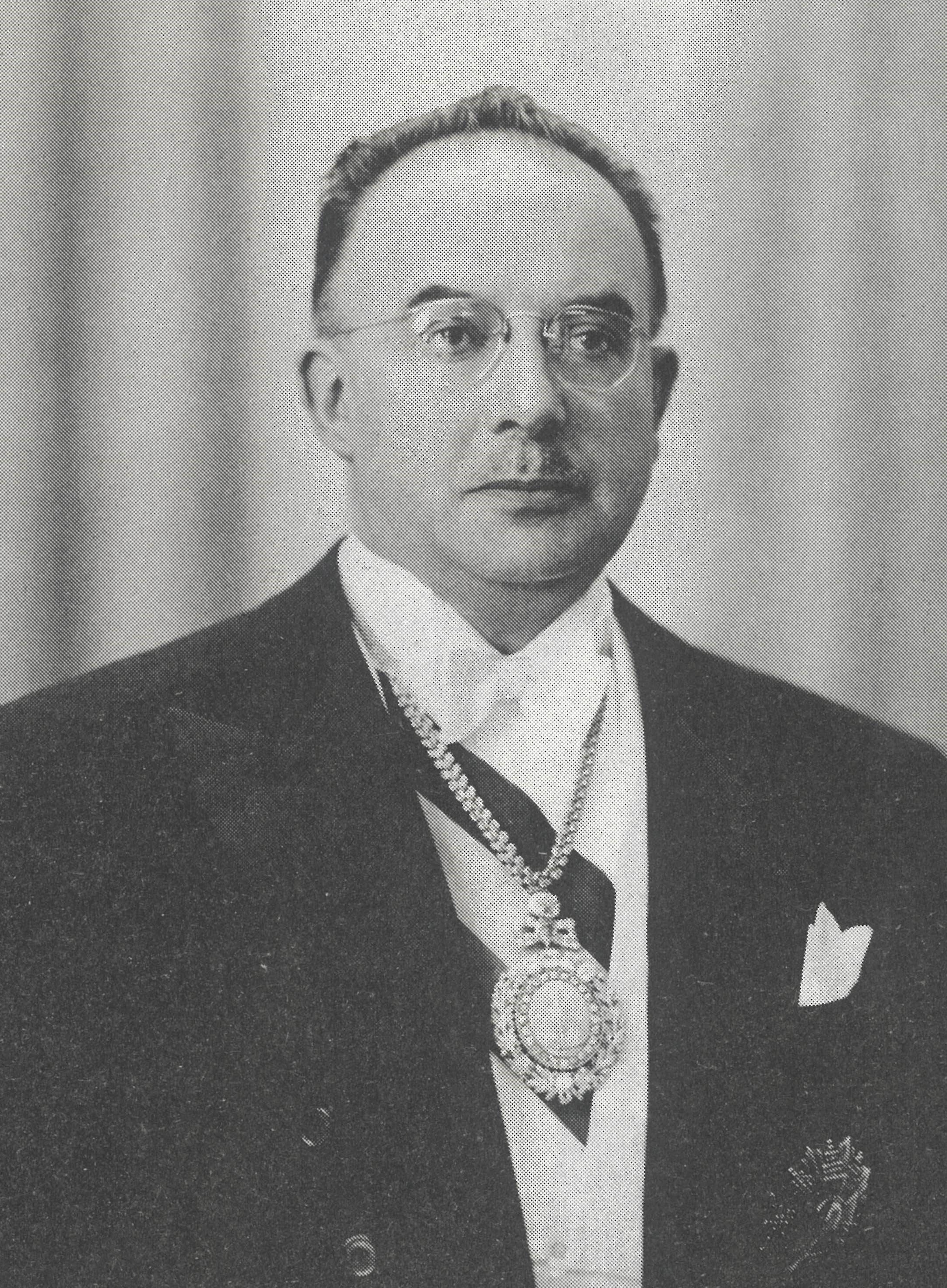
- Portrait of Hertzog, c. 1947–1949

42nd President of Bolivia
- In office 10 March 1947 – 22 October 1949
- Vice President: Mamerto Urriolagoitía
- Preceded by: Tomás Monje
- Succeeded by: Mamerto Urriolagoitía
Ministerial offices
Minister of Labor, Health, and Social Security
In office 16 September 1943 – 20 December 1943
President	Enrique Peñaranda
Preceded by	Juan Manuel Balcázar
Succeeded by	Víctor Andrade Uzquiano
Minister of War and Colonization
In office 15 December 1932 – 30 November 1933
President	Daniel Salamanca
Preceded by	Joaquín Espada
Succeeded by	José Antonio Quiroga
Minister of Development and Communications
In office 25 October 1932 – 9 January 1933
President	Daniel Salamanca
Preceded by	Agustín Villegas
Succeeded by	José G. Almaraz
Minister of Government and Justice
In office 9 March 1932 – 25 October 1932
President	Daniel Salamanca
Preceded by	Luis Calvo
Succeeded by	Demetrio Canelas

Personal details
- Born: José Enrique Hertzog Garaizábal; 10 November 1897 La Paz, Bolivia
- Died: 31 July 1981 (aged 83) Buenos Aires, Argentina
- Party: Republican Socialist Unity (1946–1979)
- Other political affiliations: Genuine Republican (before 1946)
- Spouse: Edna Sánchez
- Parents: Enrique Hertzog; Eduviges Garaizábal
- Education: Higher University of San Andrés
- Occupation: Physician; politician

José Enrique Hertzog Garaizábal (Note: Spanish pronunciation: [enˈrike (x)eɾtˈsoɣ ɡaɾajˈsaβal].) (10 November 1897 – 31 July 1981) was a Bolivian physician and politician who served as the 42nd president of Bolivia from 1947 to 1949.

== Biography ==
Hertzog was born on 10 November 1897. A medical doctor by trade, Hertzog joined the Genuine Republican Party of Daniel Salamanca in the 1920s, and rose to become Minister of Public Information and Communications as well as Minister of War during the 1932–1935 Chaco War against Paraguay, which Bolivia lost.

== President of Bolivia ==
In 1947 elections he ran for president on a ticket of united Republican Party (Bolivia) factions (former Saavedrists, Genuines, etc.) calling themselves the Republican Socialist Unity Party (Partido de la Unión Republicana Socialista [PURS]). He won against the Liberal leader Fernando Guachalla and the reformist candidate Víctor Paz Estenssoro, who led the Movimiento Nacionalista Revolucionario (Nationalist Revolutionary Movement).

Hertzog faced innumerable obstacles during his term, mostly in the form of constant rebellion from the lower sectors of society, as represented by striking miners and union workers. He was also saddled with the implacable opposition of Paz's MNR party and its allies, in addition to a declining economy. In essence, the attempt of the privileged sectors – led by Hertzog himself – to "turn back the clock" to the oligarchic pre-Chaco War status quo did not work. Rising expectations and demands from an increasingly activist and indeed, violent, popular class, combined with the unwillingness or inability of the governing elites to give concession that would undermine their power, led the country to the very brink of civil war. On 18 September 1947 he declared the state of siege.

Escalating repressive measures, such as arrest and deportation of many MNR leaders, only bred further discontent. When the legislative elections of 1949 confirmed the dramatic ascendancy of the parties of the Left, the PURS leadership lost trust in the relatively more conciliatory Hertzog's ability to control the situation. They forced his resignation for "reasons of (non-existing) illness" in favor of his far more combative vice-president, Mamerto Urriolagoitía.

== Later life ==
A few months later Hertzog was named Bolivia's Ambassador to Spain. Following the 1952 Bolivian National Revolution that brought Paz Estenssoro's MNR party to power, the ex-President remained exiled in the Spanish capital, later moving to Buenos Aires, where he died.

Hertzog again ran for President of Bolivia in 1966 on behalf of remnants of the pre-Revolution parties which had formed Democratic Institutionalist Alliance against René Barrientos, but only got a small share of the vote.

== See also ==
- Cabinet of Enrique Hertzog

== Bibliography ==
- Mesa José de; Gisbert, Teresa; and Carlos D. Mesa, Historia de Bolivia, 3rd edition., pp. 579–582.
- Gisbert, Carlos D. Mesa (2003). Presidentes de Bolivia: entre urnas y fusiles : el poder ejecutivo, los ministros de estado (in Spanish). Editorial Gisbert. pp. 344–347.

Political offices
Preceded by Luis Calvo	Minister of Government and Justice; 1932	Succeeded by Demetrio Canelas
Preceded by Agustín Villegas	Minister of Development and Communications; 1932–1933	Succeeded by José G. Almaraz
Preceded by Joaquín Espada	Minister of War and Colonization; 1932–1933	Succeeded by José Antonio Quiroga H.
Preceded by Juan Manuel Balcázar	Minister of Work, Health, and Social Security; 1943	Succeeded by Víctor Andrade Uzquiano
Preceded by Tomás Monje; Interim	President of Bolivia; 1947–1949	Succeeded by Mamerto Urriolagoitía
Party political offices
Preceded by New political party	Republican Socialist Unity nominee for President of Bolivia; 1947, 1966	Succeeded by Gabriel Gosálvez
Preceded by Gabriel Gosálvez; Republican Socialist Unity	Democratic Institutionalist Alliance nominee for President of Bolivia; 1966	Succeeded by Alliance dissolved
Preceded by Tomás Manuel Elío; Liberal	Democratic Institutionalist Alliance nominee for President of Bolivia; 1966	Succeeded by Alliance dissolved
