= Mamerto Urriolagoitía =

President of Bolivia from 1949 to 1951

Mamerto Urriolagoitia
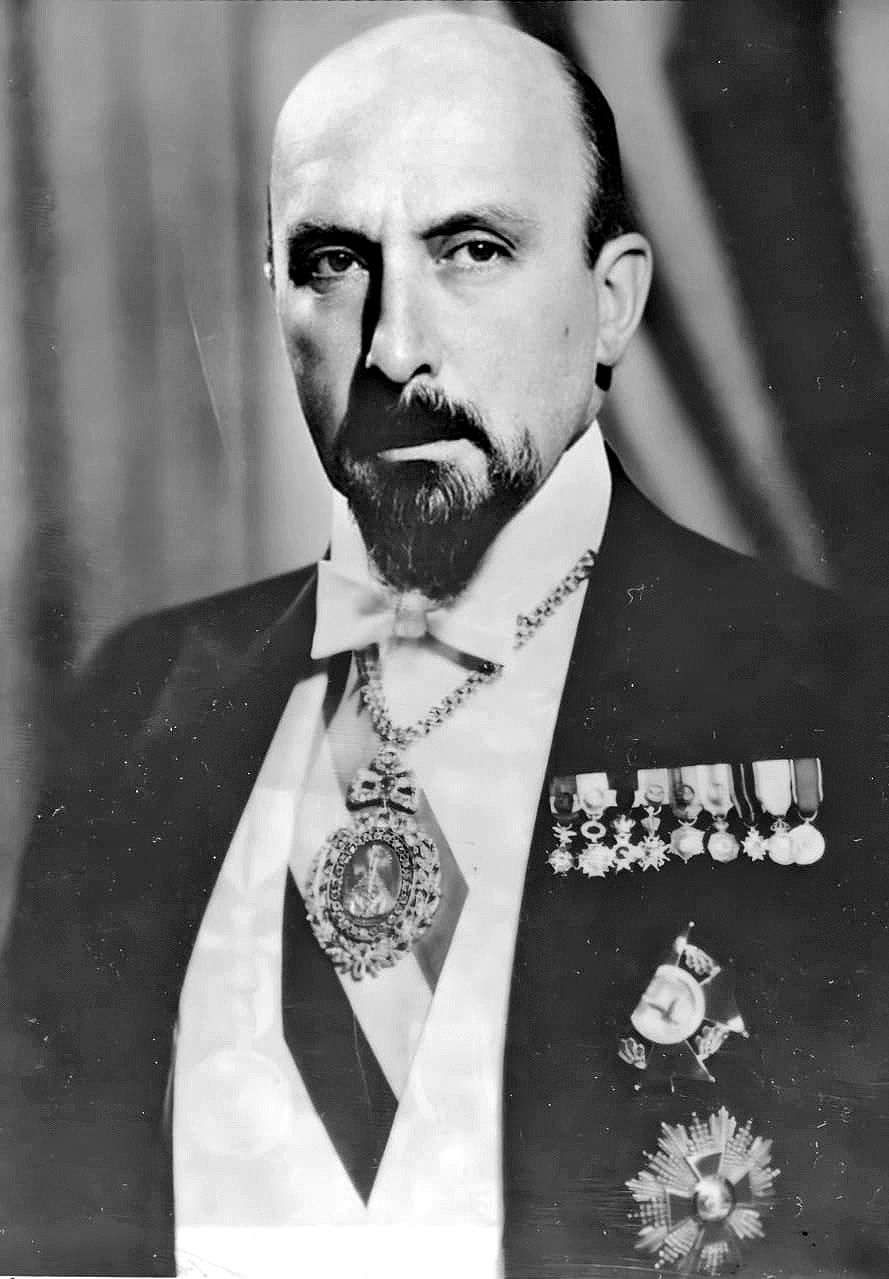

43rd President of Bolivia
- In office 24 October 1949 – 16 May 1951; Acting: 7 May 1949 – 24 October 1949
- Vice President: Vacant
- Preceded by: Enrique Hertzog
- Succeeded by: Hugo Ballivián

26th Vice President of Bolivia
- In office 10 March 1947 – 24 October 1949
- President: Enrique Hertzog
- Preceded by: Julián Montellano (1946)
- Succeeded by: Hernán Siles Zuazo (1952)

Minister of Foreign Affairs and Worship
- In office 10 March 1947 – 14 May 1947
- President: Enrique Hertzog
- Preceded by: Aniceto Solares
- Succeeded by: Luis Fernando Guachalla

Personal details
- Born: Mamerto Urriolagoitia Harriague; 5 December 1895 Sucre, Bolivia
- Died: 4 June 1974 (aged 78) Sucre, Bolivia
- Party: Republican Socialist Unity (1946–1974); United Socialist (1936–1946); Republican (before 1936)
- Spouse: Juana Hernandez Calvo
- Parent(s): Mamerto Urriolagoitía; Corina Harriague
- Education: University of Saint Francis Xavier
- Awards: Order of the Condor of the Andes; Order of Charles III; Order of Isabella the Catholic
- Mamerto Urriolagoitía's voice Speech delivered to the National Congress, c. 1952

Mamerto Urriolagoitía Harriague (Spanish pronunciation: [maˈmeɾto wrjolaˈɣojtja aˈrjaɣe]; 5 December 1895 – 4 June 1974) was a Bolivian lawyer and politician who was the 43rd president of Bolivia, from 1949 to 1951. A member of the Republican Socialist Unity Party, he had previously been the 26th vice president of Bolivia, from 1947 to 1949, under President Enrique Hertzog. Urriolagoitía's short reign was characterized by the violent suppression of the opposition, especially unionists, and he is remembered for his inflexibility. He is considered the last constitutional president of the largely oligarchic social and political order that reigned in the country until the advent of the 1952 Bolivian National Revolution.

== Early life and education ==
Urriolagoitía was born on 5 December 1895 in Sucre, Bolivia to Mamerto Urriolagoitía and Corina Harriague Moreno. He studied law at the University of San Francisco Xavier and international law at the University of Sorbonne in Paris.

== Career ==
In 1917, he started working at the Bolivian Embassy in London as First Secretary and Chargé d'affaires. He also represented Bolivia at the Postal Union Congress and the Monetary Congress. He left London in 1937 and returned to Bolivia. There, he led the Republican Socialist Unity Party and was the senator representing the Chuquisaca Department. In 1947, Urriolagoitía was elected vice-president to Dr. Enrique Hertzog. The Bolivian Civil War of 1949 broke out following a massacre at Siglo XX mine on 29 May after miners kidnapped and killed several government authorities. This led to a series of violent nationwide rebellions that continued through September. The government barely maintained hold of the country.

Around this time, Hertzog was forced to step back after suffering health problems from the pressures of the presidency. Urriolagoitía assumed the role of president on 24 October 1949. The existing Cabinet resigned and Urriolagoitía re-filled it to best suit his needs.

Much of Urriolagoitía's presidency was dedicated to repressing the reformist movement headed by the Nationalist Revolutionary Movement (MNR) of Víctor Paz Estenssoro and Juan Lechín. He crushed a number of coup d'état attempts In 1950, he issued decrees, first to make opposition parties illegal, then to outlaw unions. He instituted curfews, shut down newspapers including El proletario, and branded the MNR as communists in discussions with American President Harry Truman in hopes of gaining his support. Opponents were thrown in prison or killed; opposition leaders including Lechín, Guillermo Lora, José Fellman, and Óscar Únzaga fled the country and remained in exile. The cost of living, which had been mounting for years, continued to rise, worsened by Urriolagoitía's decision to freeze the salaries of laborers. He also raised fiscal reserves for oil, making it impossible for these resources to be nationalized and used to support Bolivians.

Meanwhile, he worked to support Gabriel González Videla's election as president of Chile. In 1950, the two discussed establishing a corridor that allowed Bolivia access to the Pacific Ocean. The Bolivian port would be established in Arica. In Bolivia, he ensured completion of the 1950 Census, the first census which was to be held in Bolivia since the turn of the 20th century.

By the 1951 presidential elections, however, the MNR, led by Paz, had gained significant popularity. Paz was declared the winner with 85,000 votes to Urriolagoitía's party's 35,000. This was even though, under the law, only about 200,000 privileged, educated, and propertied Bolivians could vote. Urriolagoitía refused to give power to Paz and instead installed the head of the Bolivian military, General Hugo Ballivián, as president to prevent the MNR from taking power. This coup against the democratic order would come to be known as the Mamertazo of 1951.

With the elections annulled and Ballivián firmly installed in the Palacio Quemado, Urriolagoitía fled to Chile, where he settled in Arica. In exile, he wrote Bolivia (1825–1925) and stayed out of the political scene. He eventually returned to his native Sucre, where he died on 4 June 1974 at the age of 78.

== Bibliography ==
- Mesa, José de; Gisbert, Teresa; and Carlos D. Mesa, Historia de Bolivia, 3rd edition., pp. 579–587.

Party political offices
Preceded by New political party	Republican Socialist Unity nominee for Vice President of Bolivia; 1947	Succeeded by Roberto Arce; Alliance
Political offices
Vacant Title last held by Julián Montellano	Vice President of Bolivia; 1947–1949	Vacant Title next held by Hernán Siles Zuazo
Vacant Title last held by Aniceto Solares	Minister of Foreign Affairs and Worship; 1947	Succeeded by Luis Fernando Guachalla
Vacant Title last held by Enrique Hertzog	President of Bolivia; 1949–1951	Succeeded by Hugo Ballivián
