= Socialist Republican Union Party =

Defunct political party in Bolivia

Socialist Republican Union Party Partido de la Unión Republicana Socialista
- Leader: Enrique Hertzog
- Founded: 10 November 1946
- Dissolved: c. 1980
- Merger of: Republican Socialist Party; Genuine Republican Party; United Socialist Party; Independent Socialist Party
- Headquarters: La Paz
- Ideology: Conservatism; Nationalism; Anti-communism; Anti-fascism
- Political position: Centre-right to right-wing
- National affiliation: Democratic Institutionalist Alliance (1966); Nationalist Union of the People (1978)

Party flag

The Socialist Republican Union Party (Spanish: Partido de la Unión Republicana Socialista; PURS) was a political party in Bolivia that existed from 1946 to c. 1980. The party espoused conservative socialism, and sat at the center-right to right-wing of the political spectrum. Its members were known as pursistas.

The party was founded on 10 November 1946 as the fusion of the Socialist Republican Party, the Genuine Republican Party, the United Socialist Party, and the Independent Socialist Party.

Despite its socialist-sounding name, the PURS was actually a conservative party. It represented a last-ditch effort of Bolivia's traditional political establishment to oppose the forces of mass-based populism and of socialism represented by the Revolutionary Nationalist Movement (MNR).

Led by Enrique Hertzog, Francisco Lazcano, Waldo Belmonte, and Mamerto Urriolagoitía, the Socialist Republican Unity Party attempted particularly to revive the position and popularity of the old Saavedristas wing of the Republican Party. The PURS favored anti-communism, ample room for free enterprise, and anti-fascism, primarily interpreted as opposition to the MNR.

The PURS participated in the 1947 and 1951 general elections. Hertzog was elected President of the Republic in 1947, with Urriolagoitía as his vice-president; and the latter succeeded to the presidency when Hertzog resigned because of ill health.

In the 1951 elections, Gabriel Gosálvez ran for the PURS but received far fewer votes than the winner, Víctor Paz Estenssoro. PURS supported the military takeover which followed the elections, in order to prevent Paz from becoming president on the basis of his popular plurality.

The PURS would never come close to taking power again. It nominally continued to exist through the early 1970s, but largely became inactive after 1952.

For the 1966 elections, the PURS was a component of the Democratic Institutionalist Alliance, with Hertzog as the coalition's presidential candidate. He polled 11,400 votes (01.13%) and came sixth.

In 1978 PURS allied with the Nationalist Union of the People and its candidate Juan Pereda.
