= Tomás Monje =

President of Bolivia from 1946 to 1947

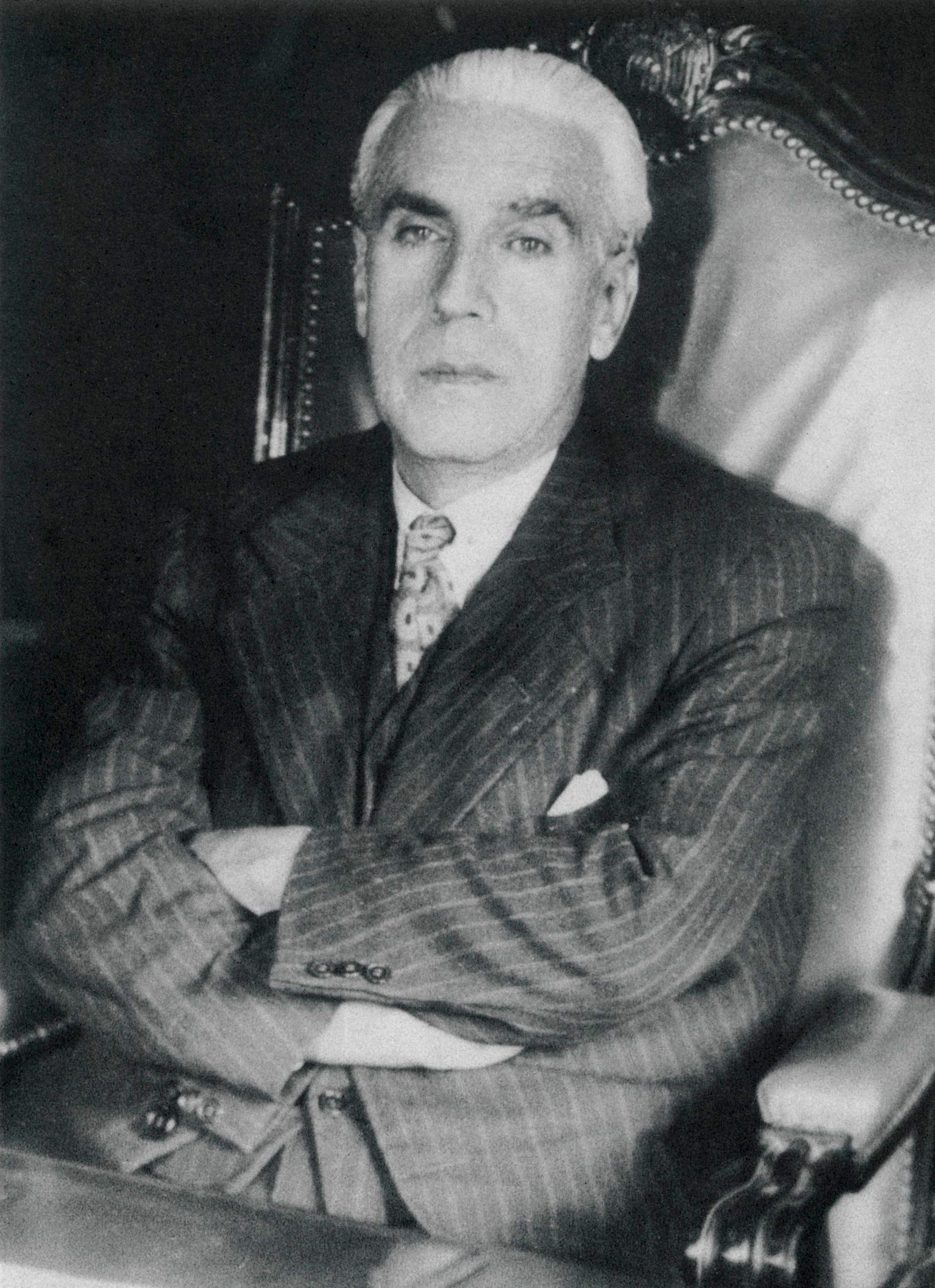
- Official portrait, c. 1946–1947

41st President of Bolivia
- In office 17 August 1946 – 10 March 1947
- Vice President: Vacant
- Preceded by: Néstor Guillén
- Succeeded by: Enrique Hertzog
Other offices
President of the Government Junta
In office 17 August 1946 – 10 March 1947
Preceded by	Néstor Guillén
Succeeded by	Office dissolved
Minister of Instruction and Agriculture
In office 10 April 1926 – 14 March 1927
President	Hernando Siles
Preceded by	Eduardo Díez de Medina
Succeeded by	Natalio Fernández

Personal details
- Born: Tomás Monje Gutierréz; 21 December 1884 Coroico, La Paz, Bolivia
- Died: 1 July 1954 (aged 69) La Paz, Bolivia
- Spouse: Raquel Soria Galvarro
- Parents: Seferino Monje; Saturnina Gutierréz
- Occupation: Judge; jurist; politician

Tomás Monje Gutierréz (21 December 1884 – 1 July 1954) was a Bolivian judge, jurist, and politician who served as the 41st president of Bolivia from 1946 to 1947.

== Background and earlier career ==
Born in Coroico, La Paz Department, he was a noted intellectual and judge. He served as deputy minister of agriculture 1926–27. From 1930 until 1936, he was Attorney general.

== President of Bolivia ==
In his capacity as head of the Bolivian Supreme Court, he was named president by the forces that toppled President Gualberto Villarroel via coup d'état on 21 July 1946. Monje happened to be ill at the time, however, which is why his deputy, Néstor Guillén, filled in for him for 27 days, until Monje was well enough to be sworn in August of the same year. Very much a caretaker president, Monje Gutiérrez was in charge with the simple task of calling elections as soon as possible. This done, he transferred power to the winner of the January 1947 elections, the conservative Enrique Hertzog.

== Post-Presidency and death ==
At that point, Monje returned to relative obscurity, dying in La Paz on 1 July 1954.

== Sources ==
- Mesa José de; Gisbert, Teresa; and Mesa Gisbert, Carlos D., "Historia de Bolivia", 3rd edition. pp. 577–578.

Political offices
Preceded by Eduardo Díez de Medina	Minister of Instruction and Agriculture; 1926–1927	Succeeded by Natalio Fernández
Preceded by Néstor Guillén	President of Bolivia; 1946–1947	Succeeded by Enrique Hertzog
Government offices
Preceded by Néstor Guillén	President of the Government Junta; 1946–1947	Office dissolved
