= Ministry of Labor, Employment, and Social Security =

Government ministry of Bolivia

Ministry overview
- Formed: 17 May 1936
- Jurisdiction: Government of Bolivia
- Headquarters: 234 Yanacocha at Mercado, La Paz
- Minister responsible: Oscar Bruno Mercado Céspedess, Minister of Labor, Employment, and Social Security
- Child agencies: Vice-Ministry of Labor and Social Security; Vice-Ministry of Employment, Civil Service, and Cooperatives
- Website: Ministerio de Trabajo, Empleo y Previsión Social

The Ministry of Labor, Employment, and Social Security (Spanish: Ministerio de Trabajo, Empleo y Previsión Social) is a Bolivian government ministry which oversees labor relations, pensions and social security programs. Since 2 June 2011, it has been headed by Minister Daniel Santalla Torres, a politician and former factory union leader. He succeeded Félix Rojas in the position.

The Ministry was founded by the government of Germán Busch during his first brief appearance as president. Indeed it was formed on the same day as the bloodless military coup that brought him to power. Under the "military socialism" of Presidents Busch and David Toro, the Labor Ministry articulated a labor code and propelled mass unionization of Bolivian workers. The appointment of Waldo Álvarez, a printing worker and Secretary General of the Federación Obrera de Trabajadores, to be the first Minister of Labor began a long tradition of trade unionists leading the Ministry. The ministry was known as the Ministry of Labor, Social Security, and Health (Spanish: Ministerio del Trabajo, Prevision Social y Salubridad) until the creation of a Public Health Ministry (Spanish: Ministerio de Sanidad Pública) in 1938.

The Ministry's organizational structure was last set by Chapter XV of Supreme Decree 29894, issued by President Evo Morales on 7 February 2009. Its organizational hierarchy is as follows:

- Vice-Ministry of Labor and Social Security
  - General Directorate of Labor, Hygiene, and Occupational Safety
  - General Directorate of Social Security Policy (Spanish: Políticas de Previsión Social)
  - General Directorate of Trade Union Issues
- Vice-Ministry of Employment, Civil Service, and Cooperatives — Vice Minister Ing. Luis Gonzalo Cornejo Hernández
  - General Directorate of Employment
  - General Directorate of Civil Service
  - General Directorate of Cooperatives

The General Directorate of Social Security Policy is charged with unifying Bolivia's retirement and social security systems into a single unified system.
