= Ministry of Rural Development (Bolivia) =

Government ministry of Bolivia

Ministry of Rural Development and Lands
Agency overview
- Headquarters: La Paz, Bolivia
- Agency executive: Edwin Ronald Characayo, Minister
- Child agencies: Vice Ministry of Agricultural Development; Vice Ministry of Coca and Integral Development
- Website: www.ruralytierras.gob.bo

The Ministry of Rural Development and Lands (Spanish: Ministerio de Desarrollo Rural y Tierras) is a Bolivian government ministry in charge of rural development. The current minister is Edwin Ronald Characayo. The Ministry has three two child agencies: Agricultural Development and Coca and Integral Development.

== See also ==
- Cabinet of Bolivia
