= Cabinet of Gualberto Villarroel =

Bolivian presidential administration and ministerial cabinet from 1943 to 1946

Villarroel cabinet
- 108th–111th Cabinet of the Republic of Bolivia
- 1943–1946
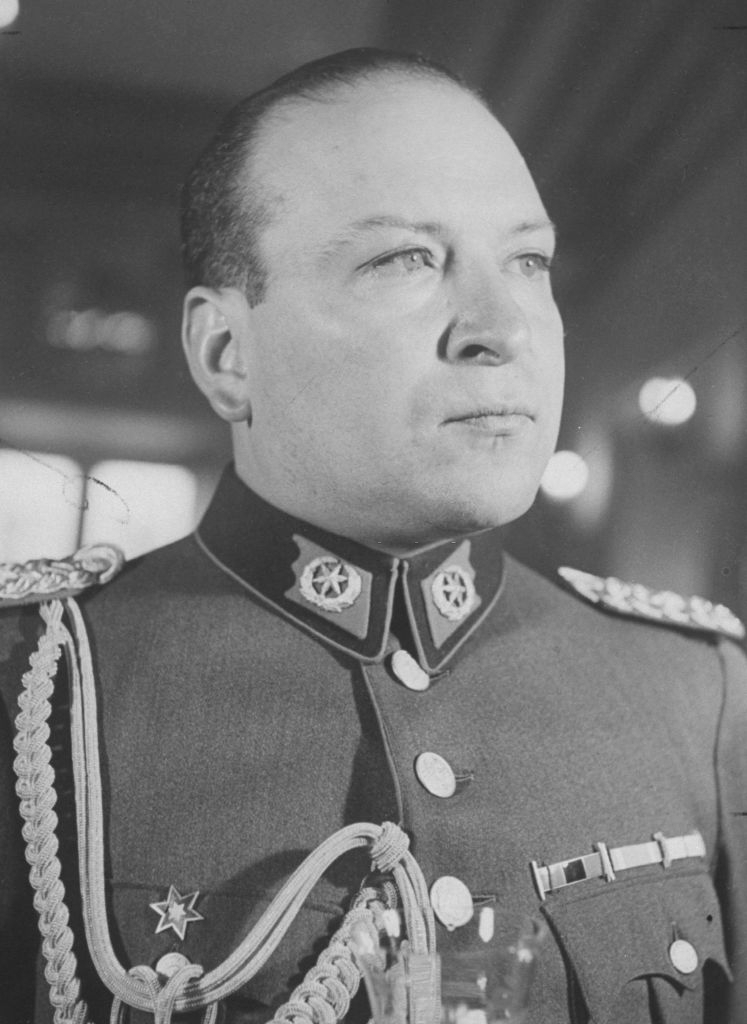
- Date formed: 20 December 1943
- Date dissolved: 21 July 1946

People and organisations
- President: Gualberto Villarroel
- Vice President: None (1943–1945); Julián Montellano
- No. of ministers: 9 (on 21 July 1946)
- Total no. of members: 20 (including former members)
- Member parties: Revolutionary Nationalist Movement (MNR); Independent Socialist Party (PSI)
- Status in legislature: Majority government

History
- Legislature term: 1944–1946
- Predecessor: Cabinet of Enrique Peñaranda
- Successor: Cabinet of Néstor Guillén (interim)

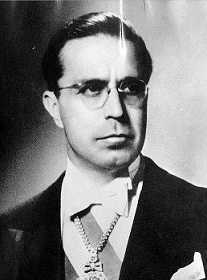
Minister of Finance Víctor Paz Estenssoro, leader of the Revolutionary Nationalist Movement (MNR)

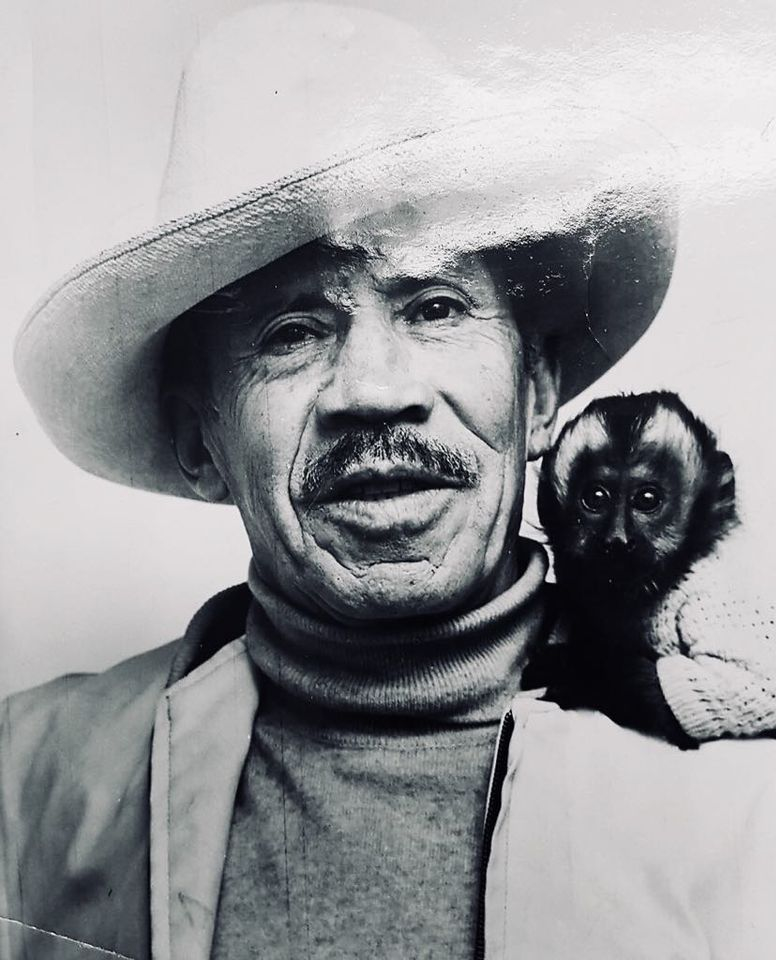
Secretary-General Augusto Céspedes, a noted MNR diplomat and journalist

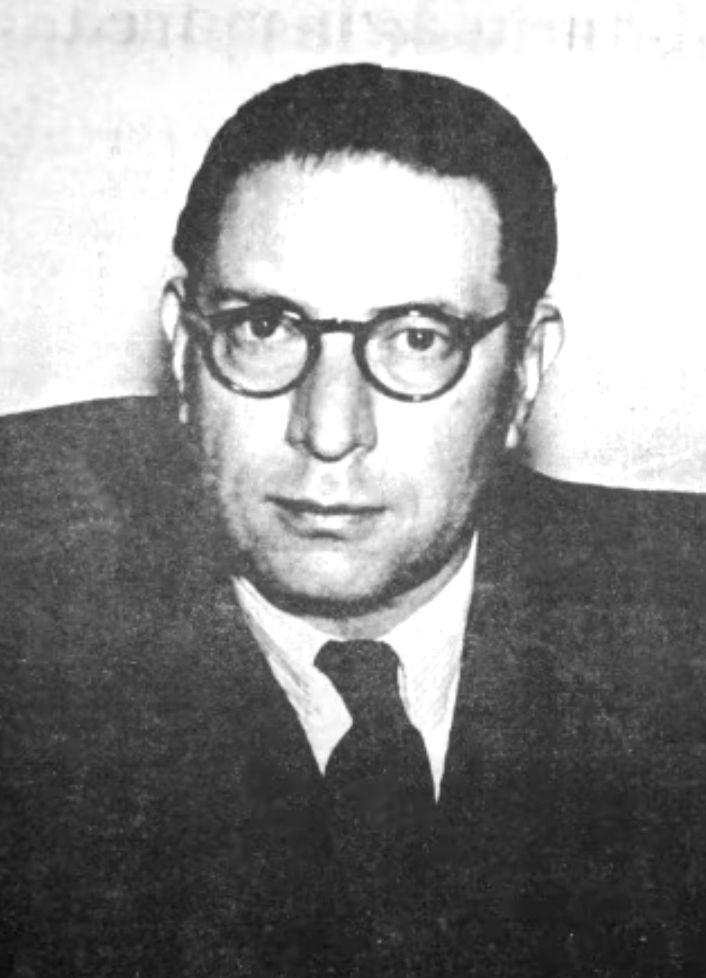
Foreign Minister Enrique Baldivieso served in the position twice prior

Gualberto Villarroel assumed office as the 39th President of Bolivia on 20 December 1943, and his term was violently cut short by his death on 21 July 1946. A colonel during the Chaco War, Villarroel and the Reason for the Fatherland (RADEPA) military lodge joined the fledgling Revolutionary Nationalist Movement (MNR) to overthrow President Enrique Peñaranda in a coup d'état.

Villarroel formed four cabinets during his 31-month presidency, constituting the 108th to 111th national cabinets of Bolivia. A fifth cabinet was announced on 20 July 1946 but the events of 21 July which resulted in the deposition of the government halted that cabinet from entering office.

== Cabinet Ministers ==
Cabinet of Bolivia Presidency of Gualberto Villarroel, 1943–1946
Office		Minister	Party	Prof.	Term	Days	N.C (Note: Denoting which national cabinet the minister was originally a part of.)	P.C (Note: Denoting which presidential cabinet the minister was originally a part of.)
President		Gualberto Villarroel	RADEPA	Mil.	20 December 1943 – 21 July 1946	944	–	–
Vice President		Office blank 20 December 1943 – 24 November 1945 (Note: On 3 November 1945, Julián Montellano would be proclaimed Vice President of the Republic and inaugurated on 6 November. However, the office of Vice President would remain officially abolished until the promulgation of a new constitution on 24 November.)						
Vice President		Julián Montellano	MNR	Law.	6 November 1945 – 21 July 1946	257	–	–
Secretary-General of the Junta		Augusto Céspedes	MNR	Jrnl.	20 December 1943 – 11 February 1944	53	108	1
Secretary-General of the Junta		Wálter Guevara	MNR	Law.	11 February 1944 – 5 April 1944	54	108	1
Secretary-General of the Junta		Junta dissolved on 5 April 1944						
Minister of Foreign Affairs and Worship (Chancellor)		José Tamayo Solares	PSI	Law.	20 December 1943 – 16 March 1944	87	108	1
Minister of Foreign Affairs and Worship (Chancellor)		Enrique Baldivieso	PSI	Law.	16 March 1944 – 8 August 1944	145	109	2
Minister of Foreign Affairs and Worship (Chancellor)		Víctor Andrade Uzquiano	Ind.	Law.	8 August 1944 – 31 December 1944	145	110	3
Minister of Foreign Affairs and Worship (Chancellor)		Gustavo Chacón	Ind.	Law.	31 December 1944 – 21 July 1946	567	111	4
Minister of Government, Justice, and Immigration		Alberto Taborga	RADEPA	Mil.	20 December 1943 – 11 February 1944	53	108	1
Minister of Government, Justice, and Immigration		Alfredo Pacheco	RADEPA	Mil.	11 February 1944 – 8 August 1944	179	108	1
Minister of Government, Justice, and Immigration		Alfredo Pacheco	RADEPA	Mil.	11 February 1944 – 8 August 1944	179	109	2
Minister of Government, Justice, and Immigration		Alfonso Quinteros	RADEPA	Mil.	8 August 1944 – 31 December 1944	145	110	3
Minister of Government, Justice, and Immigration		Edmundo Nogales Ortiz	RADEPA	Mil.	31 December 1944 – 21 July 1946	567	111	4
Minister of National Defense		José Celestino Pinto (Note: Acting Foreign Minister in the absence of Gustavo Chacón from 19 October 1945 to 27 May 1946.)	RADEPA	Mil.	20 December 1943 – 21 July 1946	944	108	1
Minister of National Defense		José Celestino Pinto	RADEPA	Mil.	20 December 1943 – 21 July 1946	944	109	2
Minister of National Defense		José Celestino Pinto	RADEPA	Mil.	20 December 1943 – 21 July 1946	944	110	3
Minister of National Defense		José Celestino Pinto	RADEPA	Mil.	20 December 1943 – 21 July 1946	944	111	4
Minister of National Defense		Ángel Rodríguez (Note: Appointed but never officially constituted.)	RADEPA	Mil.	21 July 1946 – 21 July 1946	<1	–	5
Minister of Finance and Statistics		Víctor Paz Estenssoro	MNR	Law.	20 December 1943 – 5 April 1944	107	108	1
Minister of Finance and Statistics		Jorge Zarco Kramer	–	Law.	5 April 1944 – 31 December 1944	270	109	2
Minister of Finance and Statistics		Jorge Zarco Kramer	–	Law.	5 April 1944 – 31 December 1944	270	110	3
Minister of Finance and Statistics		Víctor Paz Estenssoro	MNR	Law.	31 December 1944 – 21 July 1946	567	111	4
Minister of Economy		Gustavo Chacón	Ind.	Law.	20 December 1943 – 31 December 1944	377	108	1
Minister of Economy		Gustavo Chacón	Ind.	Law.	20 December 1943 – 31 December 1944	377	109	2
Minister of Economy		Gustavo Chacón	Ind.	Law.	20 December 1943 – 31 December 1944	377	110	3
Minister of Economy		Office vacant 31 December 1944 – 21 July 1946					111	4
Minister of Public Works and Communications		Antonio Ponce	RADEPA	Mil.	20 December 1943 – 21 July 1946	944	108	1
Minister of Public Works and Communications		Antonio Ponce	RADEPA	Mil.	20 December 1943 – 21 July 1946	944	109	2
Minister of Public Works and Communications		Antonio Ponce	RADEPA	Mil.	20 December 1943 – 21 July 1946	944	110	3
Minister of Public Works and Communications		Antonio Ponce	RADEPA	Mil.	20 December 1943 – 21 July 1946	944	111	4
Minister of Work and Social Security	Minister of Hygiene	Víctor Andrade Uzquiano	Ind.	Law.	20 December 1943 – 8 August 1944	232	108	1
Minister of Work and Social Security	Minister of Hygiene	Víctor Andrade Uzquiano	Ind.	Law.	20 December 1943 – 8 August 1944	232	109	2
Minister of Work and Social Security	Minister of Health	Remberto Capriles	–	–	8 August 1944 – 31 December 1944	145	110	3
Minister of Work and Social Security	Minister of Health	Germán Monroy Block	MNR	Law.	31 December 1944 – 21 July 1946	567	111	4
Minister of Education, Fine Arts, and Indigenous Affairs		Jorge Calero (Note: Acting Foreign Minister in the absence of Gustavo Chacón from 27 May to 21 July 1946.)	RADEPA	Mil.	20 December 1943 – 21 July 1946	944	108	1
Minister of Education, Fine Arts, and Indigenous Affairs		Jorge Calero	RADEPA	Mil.	20 December 1943 – 21 July 1946	944	109	2
Minister of Education, Fine Arts, and Indigenous Affairs		Jorge Calero	RADEPA	Mil.	20 December 1943 – 21 July 1946	944	110	3
Minister of Education, Fine Arts, and Indigenous Affairs		Jorge Calero	RADEPA	Mil.	20 December 1943 – 21 July 1946	944	111	4
Minister of Agriculture, Livestock, and Colonization		Carlos Montenegro	MNR	Law.	20 December 1943 – 11 February 1944	53	108	1
Minister of Agriculture, Livestock, and Colonization		Rafael Otazo	MNR	–	11 February 1944 – 5 April 1944	54	108	1
Minister of Agriculture, Livestock, and Colonization		Edmundo Nogales Ortiz	RADEPA	Mil.	5 April 1944 – 31 December 1944	270	109	2
Minister of Agriculture, Livestock, and Colonization		Edmundo Nogales Ortiz	RADEPA	Mil.	5 April 1944 – 31 December 1944	270	110	3
Minister of Agriculture, Livestock, and Colonization		Julio Zuazo Cuenca	MNR	–	31 December 1944 – 21 July 1946	567	111	4

== Composition ==
=== First cabinet ===
On 20 December 1943, members of the RADEPA young officers clique, in conjunction with MNR militants, overthrew the conservative government of President Enrique Peñaranda. A military junta was subsequently formed which comprised the first Villarroel ministerial cabinet. The junta was a mixture of military officers led by Colonel Gulaberto Villarroel as de facto President of the Republic and MNR politicians led by Minister of Finance Víctor Paz Estenssoro with Augusto Céspedes as secretary-general.

The new government faced opposition and lack of recognition from the United States. The distrust came as a result of U.S. participation in World War II and the erroneous belief (sparked by President Peñaranda in order to persecute political opponents) that the MNR was pro-Nazi and pro-Axis. Attempts to placate the U.S. led to the removal of top MNR ministers Augusto Céspedes and Carlos Montenegro, as well as Alberto Taborga on 11 February 1944 but the U.S. maintained its rigid stance so long as the MNR remained in government. Ultimately, the Villarroel government acquiesced and all remaining MNR ministers, including Paz Estenssoro, were removed on 5 April 1944. The removal of Wálter Guevara, who had succeeded Céspedes as Secretary-General of the Junta, brought an end to the military junta and the first Villarroel cabinet.

=== Second, third, and fourth cabinets ===
The second Villarroel cabinet was subsequently formed with "no MNR official in any position of prominence in Bolivia." This finally resulted in the U.S. recognizing the Villarroel regime in May 1944.

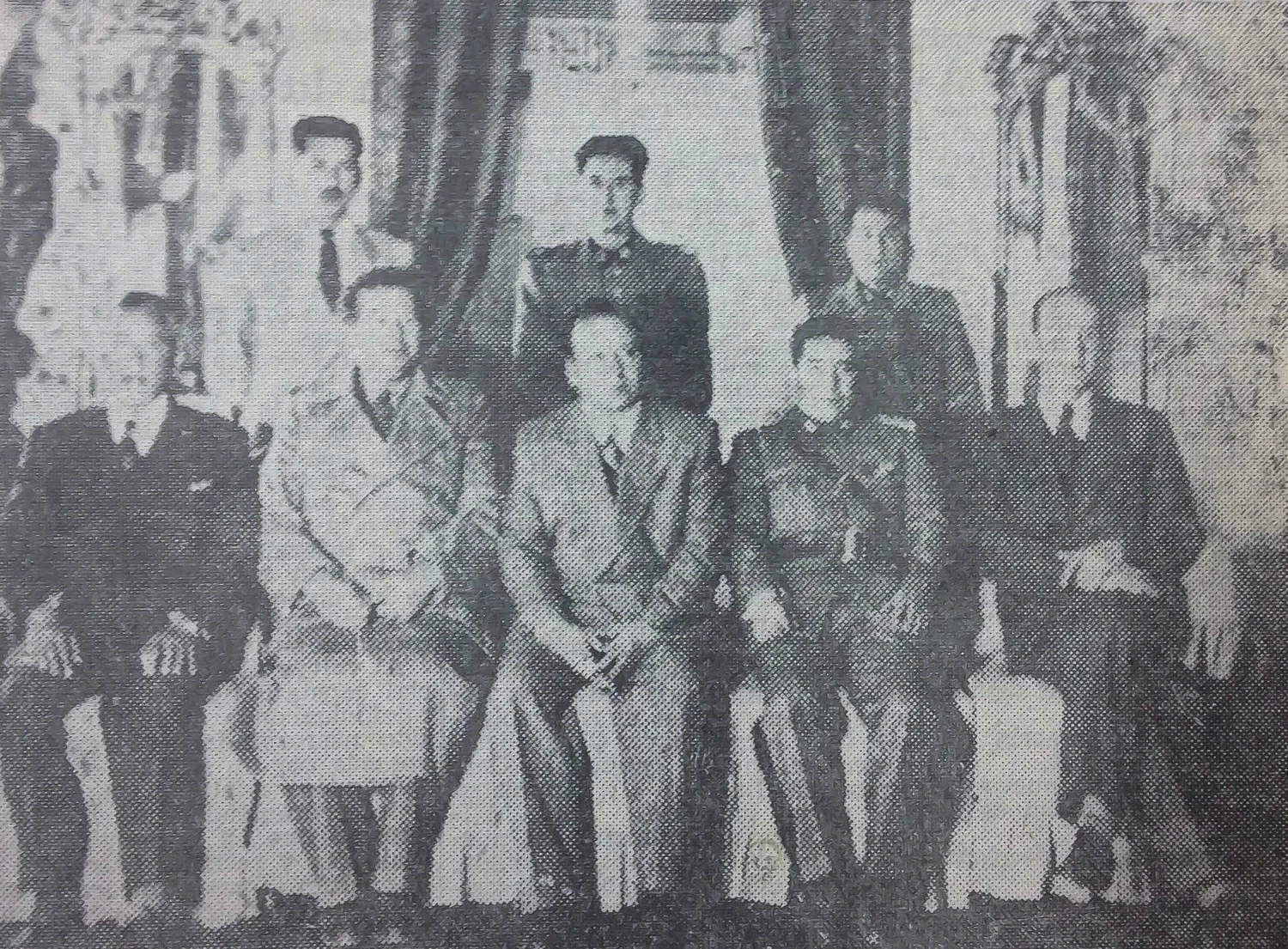
The last photo taken of Gualberto Villarroel presenting his new cabinet, 20 July 1946

A third ministerial cabinet was formed upon the resignation of three senior ministers on 8 August 1944. On 31 December 1944, with U.S.-Bolivia tensions cooled, the Villarroel administration once again invited the MNR into ministerial positions, with Paz Estenssoro returning to his position as Finance Minister. Thus was formed the fourth Villarroel cabinet. At 567 days, this was the longest lasting cabinet of the Villarroel presidency.

1945 saw the return of the office of the Vice Presidency. The position had been abolished by the government of Carlos Quintanilla on 4 December 1939 but was re-added with the promulgation of the new Political Constitution of 24 November 1945. By that point, Julián Montellano of the MNR had already been proclaimed vice president on 3 November and inaugurated on 6 November. Though the office would be vacant during long periods of time from the 1960s to the 1980s, it would never again be abolished.

=== Fifth cabinet (never took office) ===
By July 1946, Villarroel's government had lost its popularity due to the harsh repressions of the opposition and voices critical of the government. These tensions peaked when a tripartite group of workers, students, and teachers threatened to strike if wages were not raised and the MNR stayed in government. The situation spiralled out of control when the MNR Minister of Agriculture Julio Zuazo Cuenca was among a group of government officials who drunkenly smashed the windows of the Higher University of San Andrés. Attempting to deescalate the situation, President Villarroel demanded the resignation of Zuazo on 19 July. Eventually, a fifth all-military cabinet was announced on 20 July without a single holdover from the previous cabinet which presented its resignation at 7 p.m. General Ángel Rodríguez was named Minister of Defense, announcing a halt on the military's order to fire on protesters. Despite these efforts, the new cabinet would never take office as President Villarroel would be overthrown and lynched the following day, bringing an end to his government.

== Analysis ==
The administration of Gualberto Villarroel saw the definitive end of Military Socialism leading government. The concept, conceived by President David Toro and continued by President Germán Busch, had been an inspiration for the policies of RADEPA and Villarroel. Villarroel's cabinets would feature several ministers who would go on to become influential political figures in the MNR, not least of which being Finance Minister Víctor Paz Estenssoro who would go on to win the presidency a total of four times in 1951, 1960, 1964, and 1985. His party, the MNR, and its splinter groups would dominate Bolivian democratic politics from the 1952 National Revolution up until its fall from grace in 2003. Other MNR ministers in the Villarroel cabinet included Wálter Guevara, a distinguished statesman and diplomat who would serve as interim president in 1979, and Augusto Céspedes, a notable writer, journalist, and diplomat.

== Gallery ==
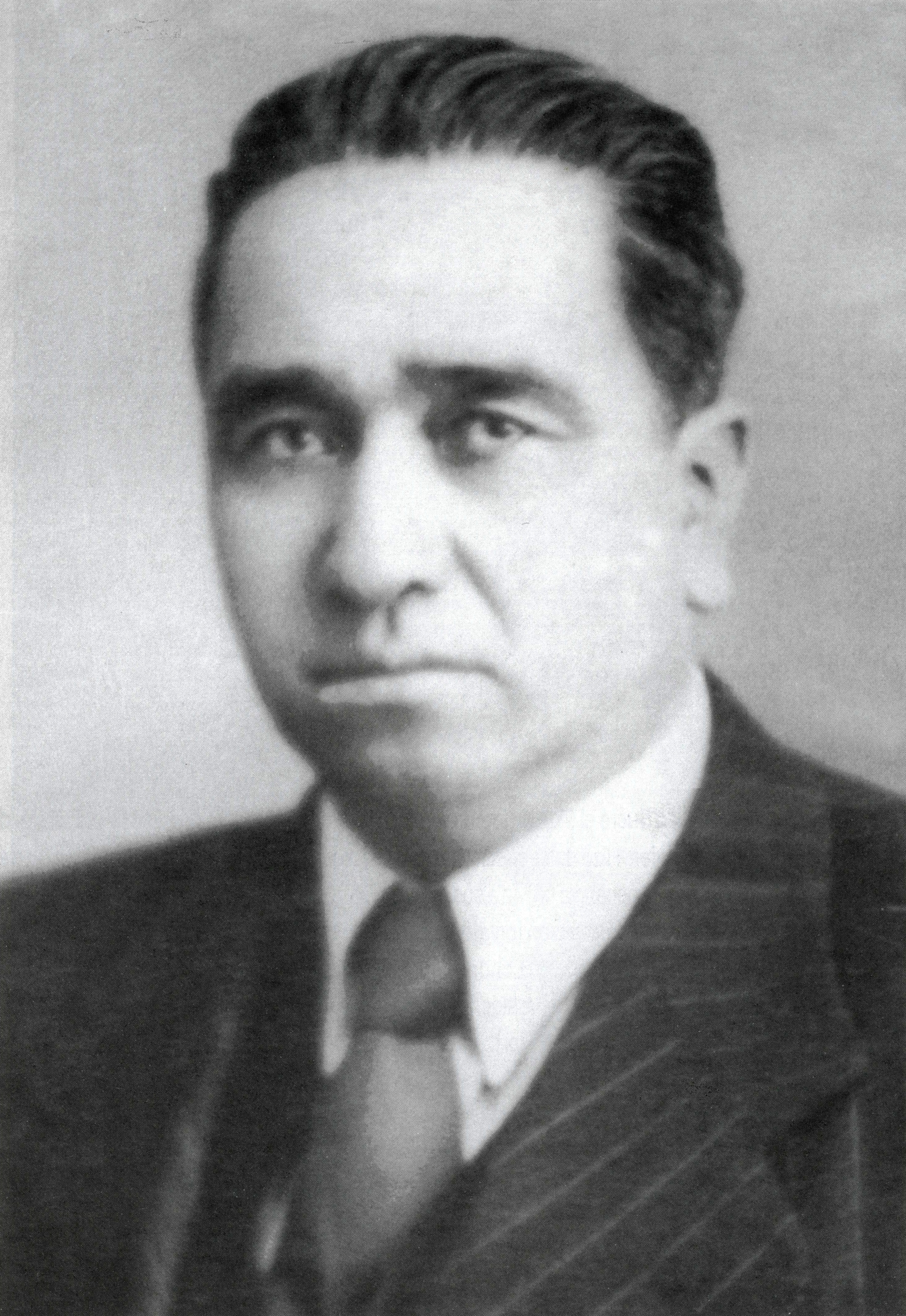
Julián Montellano –
Vice President (MNR)

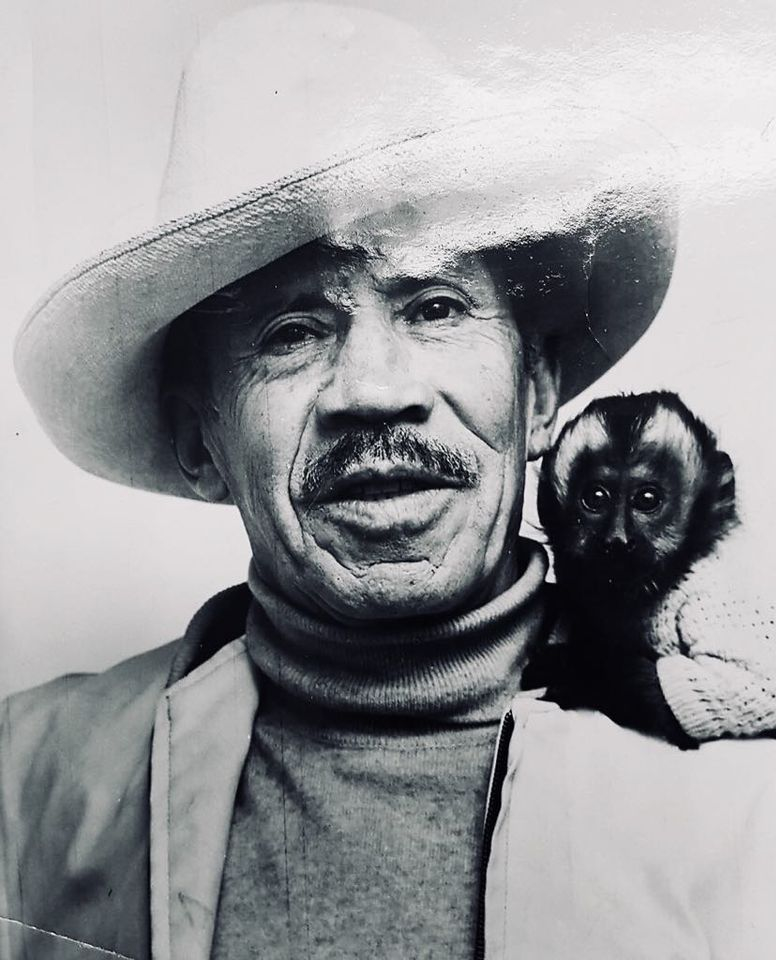
Augusto Céspedes –
Secretary-General (MNR)

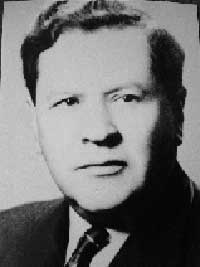
José Tamayo Solares –
Minister of Foreign Affairs (PSI)

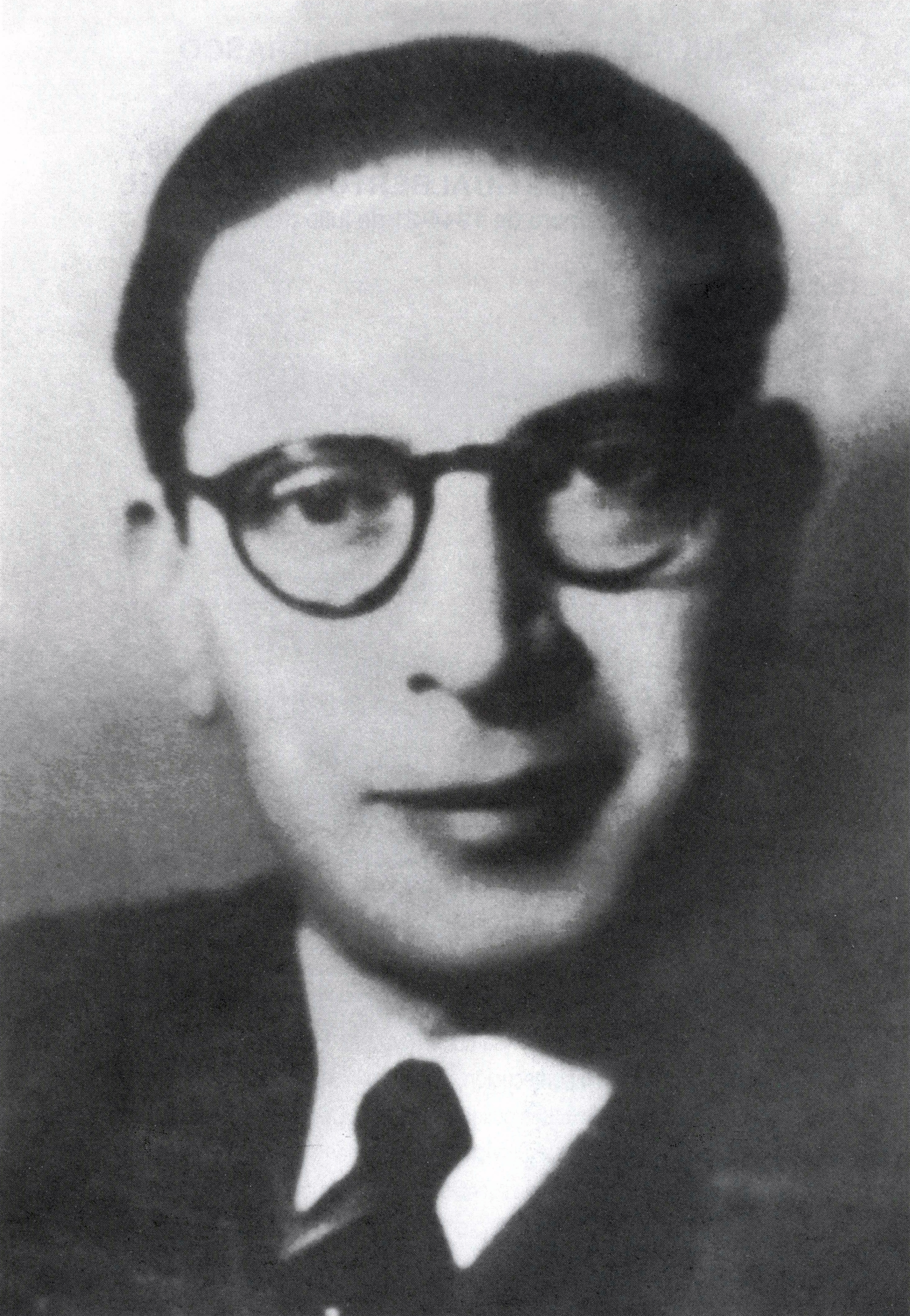
Enrique Baldivieso –
Minister of Foreign Affairs (PSI)

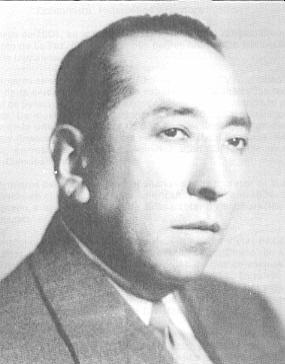
Víctor Andrade Uzquiano –
Minister of Foreign Affairs and Minister of Work and Health (Ind. (MNR))

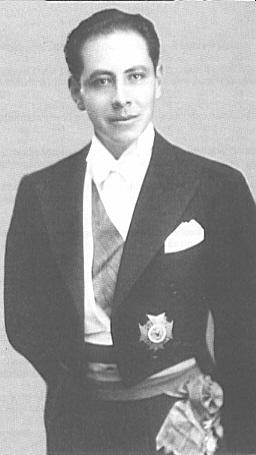
Gustavo Chacón –
Minister of Foreign Affairs and Minister of Economy

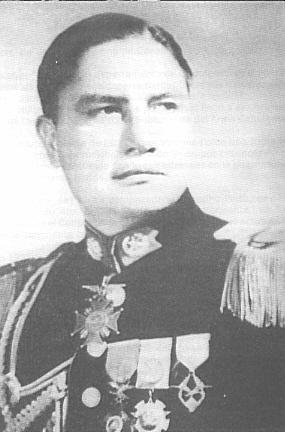
José Celestino Pinto –
Minister of National Defense (RADEPA)

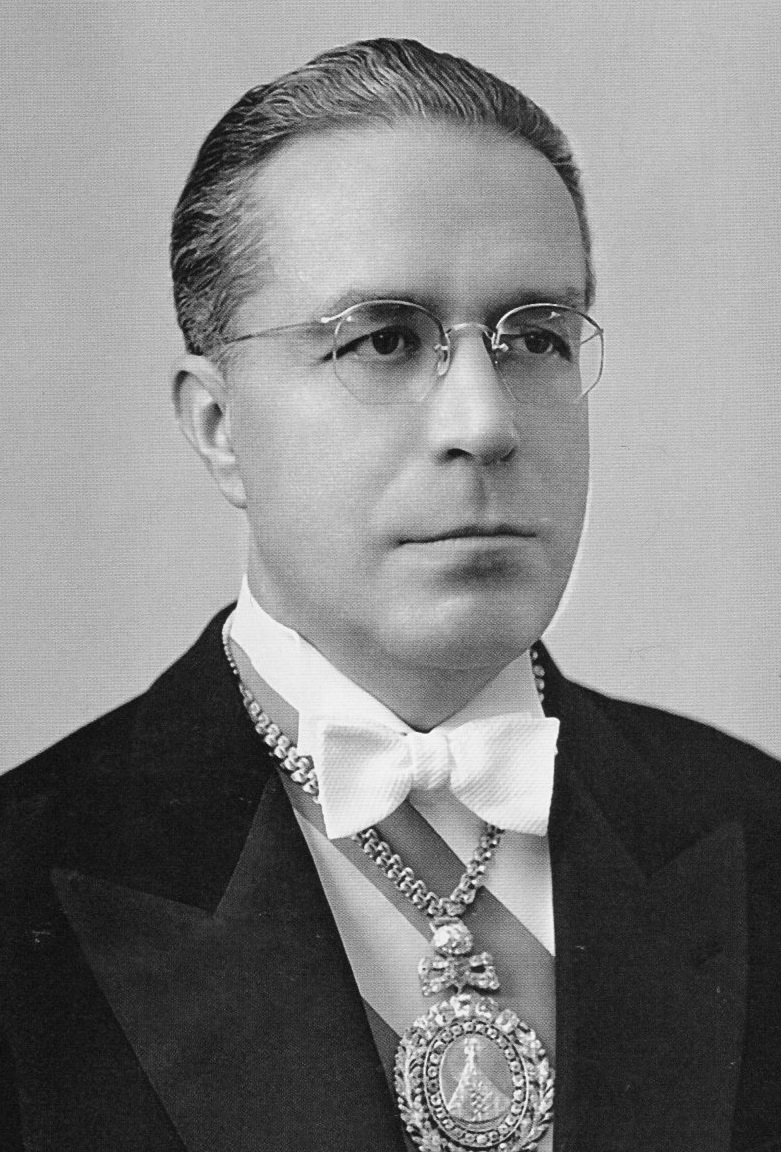
Víctor Paz Estenssoro –
Minister of Finance (MNR)

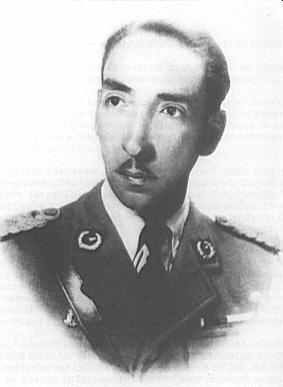
Jorge Calero -
Minister of Education (RADEPA)

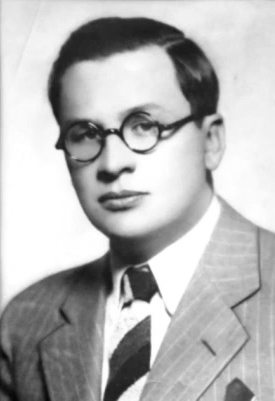
Carlos Montenegro -
Minister of Agriculture (MNR)

== See also ==
- Government Junta of Bolivia (1943–1944)

== Bibliography ==
- Gisbert, Carlos D. Mesa (2003). Presidentes de Bolivia: entre urnas y fusiles : el poder ejecutivo, los ministros de estado (in Spanish). Editorial Gisbert. pp. 346–347.
- Blasier, Cole. The United States, Germany, and the Bolivian Revolutionaries (1941-1946).
