= Eduardo Arze Quiroga =

Bolivian diplomat and journalist

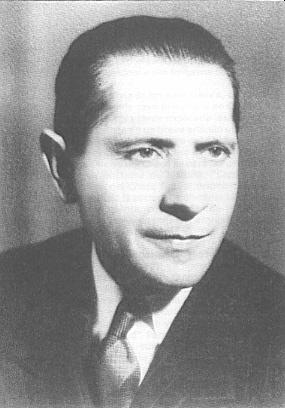

Minister of Foreign Affairs and Worship
- In office 6 August 1960 – 8 January 1962
- President: Víctor Paz Estenssoro
- Preceded by: Carlos Morales Guillen
- Succeeded by: José Fellman Velarde

Personal details
- Born: Eduardo Arze Quiroga; 6 January 1907 Cochabamba, Bolivia
- Died: 1 August 1989 (aged 82) La Paz, Bolivia
- Party: Revolutionary Nationalist Movement
- Parent(s): Enrique Arze; Rita Quiroga
- Education: University of San Simón; University of Rome

Eduardo Arze Quiroga (6 January 1907 – 1 August 1989) was a Bolivian scholar, journalist, politician, and diplomat who served as Minister of Foreign Affairs from 1960 to 1962 in the second cabinet of Víctor Paz Estenssoro. Prior to that, he served in various diplomatic offices in the governments of Enrique Peñaranda and Gualberto Villarroel.

== Early life ==
Eduardo Arze Quiroga was born on 6 January 1907 in Cochabamba, the son of Enrique Arze and Rita Quiroga. He studied Law at University of San Simón, graduating in 1927 before later studying at the Faculty of Social and Political Science of the University of Rome. Between 1921 and 1932 he served as editor-in-chief of the Cochabamba newspaper El Republicano. As a journalist, he was noted as an ardent supporter of Daniel Salamanca. Participating as a seargeant in the Chaco War, he was imprisoned for two years in Campo Grande in 1933.

Following his service, he worked as a professor at the University of San Simón Law School from 1937 and 1940. Between 1939 and 1940 he taught at the Superior War School in Cochabamba.

== Diplomatic career ==
In 1940, Arze Quiroga was appointed private secretary of provisional President Carlos Quintanilla. When Quintanilla was appointed ambassador to the Holy See, Arze Quiroga accompanied him as secretary until 1941 when he was appointed chargé d'affaires by President Enrique Peñaranda, a position he held until 1942.

Upon his return to Bolivia, Arze Quiroga emerged as a prominent leader of the Revolutionary Nationalist Movement. In December 1943, he was named Under-Secretary at the Ministry of Foreign Affairs by junta president Gualberto Villarroel. In 1944, he was elected as a deputy for Cochabamba in the 1944–1945 Constituent Assembly which drafted the 1945 Political Constitution of the Republic. While exercising these functions, he was again appointed Under-Secretary for Foreign Affairs. He led the Bolivian delegation at the Chapultepec Conference. He accompanied Foreign Minister José Celestino Pinto as a member of the Bolivian delegation at the 1945 San Francisco Conference (which established the United Nations). His tenure ended with the fall of the Villarroel government on 21 July 1946.

In 1951, Arze Quiroga returned to politics, standing as the MNR candidate for Cochabamba senator and receiving 6,750 votes. He played a prominent role during the transition of the National Revolution which followed the annulment of those elections. From 1952 to 1954 he served as the Bolivian ambassador to the United Nations. He briefly returned to Bolivia in 1955 when he was named Rector of the Higher University of San Simón but returned to diplomacy as Ambassador to Colombia between 1957 and 1959.

Finally, by Presidential Decree on 6 August 1960, he was appointed Minister of Foreign Affairs by President Víctor Paz Estenssoro. During his tenure, Arze Quiroga attended several international meetings and signed numerous agreements such as the Cultural Exchange Agreement with Czechoslovakia on 23 January 1961, the Economic Cooperation Agreement with Colombia on 2 August 1961, and the Dual Nationality Agreement with Spain on 12 October 1961.

Having fulfilled his functions, Arze Quiroga resigned from his post as Foreign Minister on 8 January 1962 and was subsequently named Ambassador to Argentina until 1964. That year, he withdrew from public positions as a result of the coup d'état which ousted the MNR from power in November. In 1973 he joined the Bolivian Academy of History, through presenting his thesis on the political philosophy of Daniel Salamanca, and began teaching History at Higher University of San Andrés in La Paz.

When Víctor Paz Estenssoro returned to office in 1985, he entrusted Arze Quiroga as Chief of Mission of the Embassy of Bolivia in Brazil. He remained in that diplomatic position for about two years.

Arze Quiroga died in La Paz in 1989.

== Publications ==
- Quiroga, Eduardo Arze (1960). Documentos para una historia de la guerra del Chaco (in Spanish). Editorial D. Bosco.
- Quiroga, Eduardo Arze (1969). Historia de Bolivia: fases del proceso hispano-americano: orígenes de la sociedad boliviana en el siglo XVI (in Spanish). Editorial "Los Amigos de Libro,".
- Quiroga, Eduardo Arze; Nación (Argentina), Archivo General de la (1975). Papeles de Cochabamba en el Archivo General de la Nación Argentina: sesquicentenario de la independencia nacional de Bolivia : homenaje del Banco Hipotecario Nacional (in Spanish). El Banco.
- Quiroga, Eduardo Arze (1981). Daniel Salamanca, estadista y pensador (in Spanish). Biblioteca Popular Boliviana de "Ultima Hora".
- Quiroga, Eduardo Arze (1991). Las relaciones internacionales de Bolivia, 1825-1990 (in Spanish). Editorial "Los Amigos del Libro".

Diplomatic posts
| Preceded by Carlos Quintanilla as ambassador | Chargé d'affaires of Bolivia to the Holy See; 1940–1941 | Succeeded by Bailón Mercado as ambassador |
Political offices
| Preceded by Carlos Morales Guillen | Minister of Foreign Affairs and Worship; 1960–1962 | Succeeded by José Fellman Velarde |
