= Carlos Montenegro =

Bolivian writer and ideologue (1903–1953)

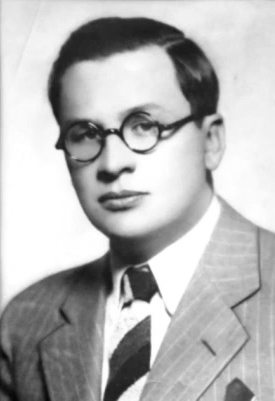

Minister of Agriculture, Livestock, and Colonization
- In office 20 December 1943 – 11 February 1944
- President: Gualberto Villarroel
- Preceded by: Julio Céspedes Añez
- Succeeded by: Rafael Otazo

Personal details
- Born: Carlos Montenegro Quiroga; 26 December 1903 Cochabamba, Bolivia
- Died: 10 March 1953 (aged 49) New York City, New York, U.S.
- Cause of death: Cardiac arrest
- Party: Revolutionary Nationalist Movement (1941–1953)
- Other political affiliations: Nationalist (1927–1936); United Socialist (1936–1941)
- Spouses: María Quiroga Vargas (m. 1927; div. 1931) Yolanda Céspedes (m. 1934)
- Relations: Augusto Céspedes (brother-in-law)
- Children: Mario; Martha; Waskar
- Parent(s): Rodolfo Montenegro; Raquel Quiroga
- Education: Higher University of San Simón

Carlos Montenegro Quiroga (26 December 1903 – 10 March 1953) was a Bolivian lawyer, journalist, politician, and writer who served as minister of agriculture from 1943 to 1944. He was the principal political theorist of the Revolutionary Nationalist Movement, co-founding the party newspaper La Calle which laid the ideological bases of the party. His most famous work, Nacionalismo y coloniaje (1943), an essay on the influence of journalism in the history of Bolivia, is considered to be one of the most influential works in Bolivian historiography.

== Early life ==
Carlos Montenegro was born on 26 December 1903 in Cochabamba to Rodolfo Montenegro Guzmán and Raquel Quiroga. Montenegro Guzmán was a writer and politician who, as chief of police, was accredited with having commanded the actions that led to the deaths of the American outlaws Butch Cassidy and the Sundance Kid, while Quiroga was the daughter of a well-to-do landowning family. Montenegro was the second of five siblings —two boys and three girls. While they initially enjoyed a relatively comfortable childhood on the family estate, their property was eventually confiscated, and their assets were significantly reduced due to debts.

At age eighteen, Montenegro entered the field of journalism, working for the avant-garde weekly magazine Arte y Trabajo. First published on 21 February 1921 with a circulation of 500 copies, the small print headed by Cesáreo Capriles López covered political issues under an individualist anarchist lens, espousing apoliticism, anti-clericalism, and libertarian education. The newspaper gained a modest reception and attracted young intellectuals such as Montenegro. His work for the outlet caused him to be excommunicated from the Catholic Church the following year on charges of heresy for having referred to Bishop of Cochabamba Francisco Pierini as "motley" and for calling Jesus Christ a figure without "divinity" in one of his publications. Nonetheless, Montenegro continued his work for Arte y Trabajo —at one point becoming its director— until 1929.

Soon after, he studied law at the Higher University of San Simón, where he graduated as a lawyer in 1925. In 1927, he married María Quiroga Vargas, a poet, writer, and teacher, with whom he had two children: Mario and Martha. However, they divorced just four years later.

== Early political career ==
Montenegro's entry into politics came in 1926 when he worked as sub-prefect of Quillacollo. The following year, he joined the National Union —later Nationalist— Party of President Hernando Siles Reyes. For having collaborated with the "tyrant Siles", the Bolivian University Federation declared him an "enemy of the youth".

=== Chaco War ===
Montenegro was twenty-nine years old when in 1932, the Chaco War erupted. Despite enlisting to serve on the front, he never wielded arms, eventually rising to the position of propaganda inspector of the General Staff. During his time in the General Staff, he cultivated a relationship with the war correspondent Augusto Céspedes with whom he shared a similar political vision and a distaste for the liberal status quo. In 1934, a year before the end of the war, he was discharged to La Paz due to a stomach ulcer. During this time, he married Yolanda Céspedes, Augusto's sister, and started a law firm.

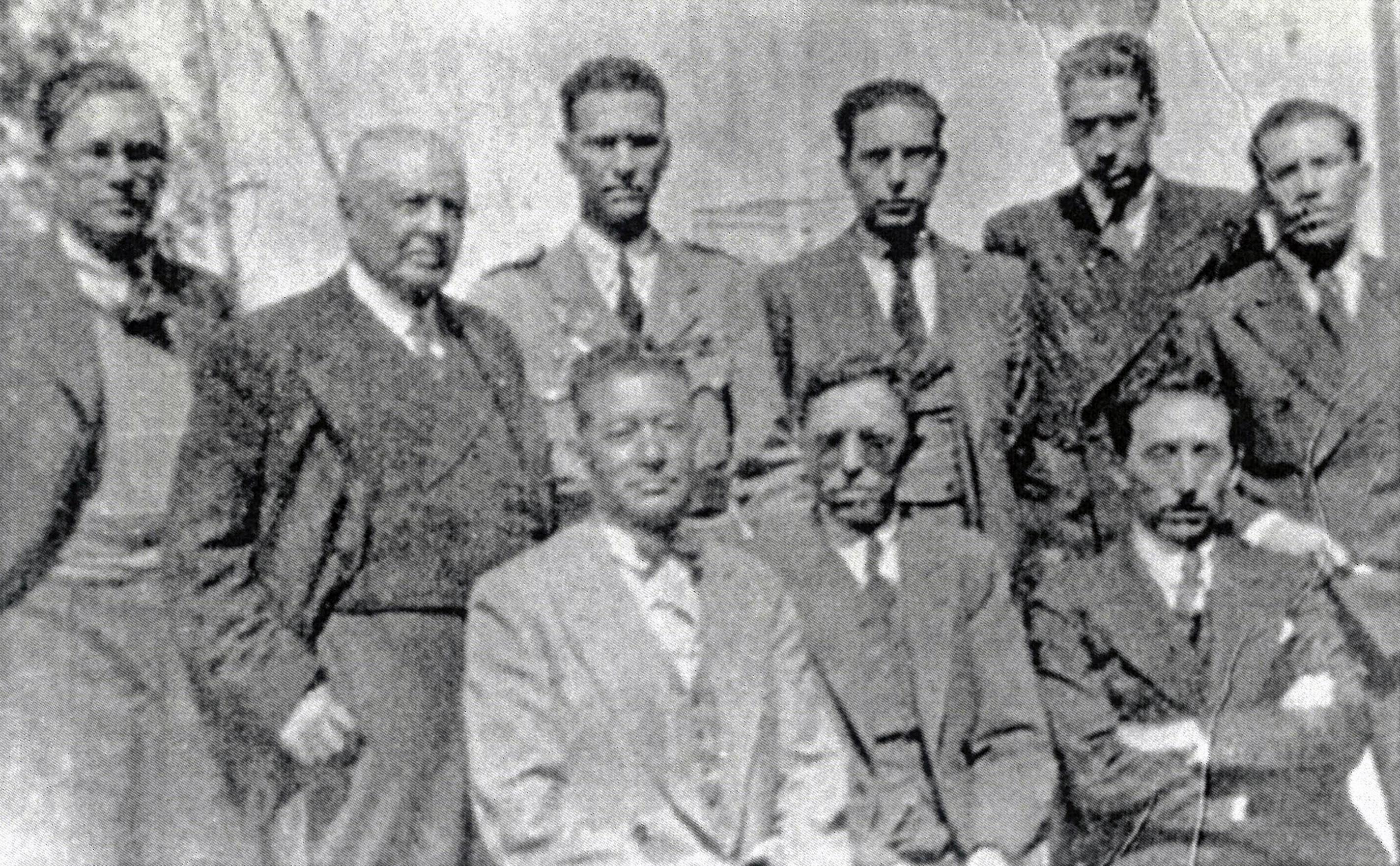
Montenegro (far left) with other conspirators that planned and executed the fall of President José Luis Tejada Sorzano in May 1936.

=== 1936 coup d'état ===
In 1936, together with Augusto Céspedes and Armando Arce, Montenegro founded the left-wing morning newspaper La Calle. The publication was the party press of the United Socialist Party (PSU), of which Montenegro was the secretary-general. During the tumultuous events of May 1936, the PSU supported the historic national strikes against the government. On 15 May, Montenegro signed a formal alliance on behalf of the PSU with the Workers' Federation of Labor (FOT). The following night, a "Revolutionary Committee" was formed, composed of Montenegro and other left-wing agitators, which occupied and raised the red flag over several government buildings of La Paz. The rebellion was the culmination of weeks of protests and strikes and resulted in left-wing elements of the military ousting the conservative government of President José Luis Tejada Sorzano.

=== Delegate to Argentina ===
During the government of Colonel David Toro —who was made president of the newly installed government junta— Montenegro soon became seen as a potential threat. His increasing demands for a higher degree of socialism, including policies that Toro could not immediately implement due to political circumstances, caused the president to fear that, if left unsatisfied, the man who masterminded the overthrow of Tejada Sorzano might do the same to him. As a result, Toro quickly moved to assign Montenegro a chore that would take him as far away from political play as possible. The president pressured Montenegro to travel to Argentina, where he served as secretary-general and counselor of the Bolivian delegation to the Chaco Peace Conference in Buenos Aires. On 3 December 1936, he arrived in the Argentine capital, beginning a two-month stint which was ultimately extended for another two-and-a-half years.

During Montenegro's de facto exile in Argentina, he became a member of the country's cultural life. During his stay, Montenegro established connections with such figures as the Argentine diplomat Honorio Pueyrredón, the historian Gabriel del Mazo, the socialist Alfredo Palacios, and the writer Ricardo Rojas, as well as the Peruvian politician Luis Alberto Sánchez, with whom he formed a lifelong bond. According to his wife: "all these illustrious characters showed great admiration and respect for Carlos; they appreciated him for his talents as a cultured, erudite, talented, and humorous man; in the conversations, there was a high level of culture and great knowledge of world problems".

Though Montenegro returned to La Paz on multiple occasions, they were always for personal reasons and never permanent. Even when Toro was overthrown, and Montenegro's close friend Germán Busch was installed in the Palacio Quemado, the figures nearest to the new president —most notably his personal secretary Gabriel Gosálvez, who viewed Montenegro poorly— ensured that Busch never recalled him from his diplomatic post. Montenegro was still in Argentina when, in 1939, he received the news that Busch had died from a self-inflicted gunshot wound. Though the provisional government of Carlos Quintanilla offered to keep him in Buenos Aires or give him a different diplomatic position, Montenegro insisted on returning.

== Return to Bolivia ==
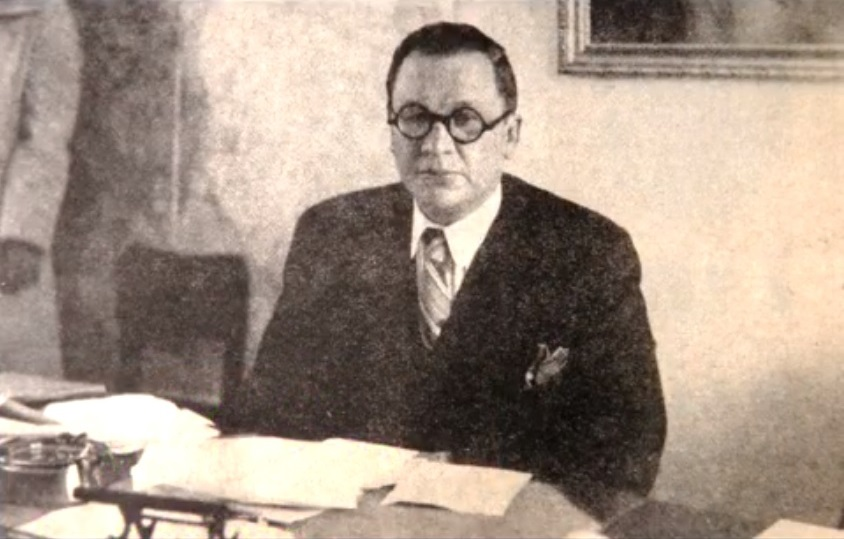
Montenegro seated at his office.

Upon his return to Bolivia in late 1939, Montenegro established the weekly periodical Busch (Bolivia United without Humiliated Classes), named after the late president. Together with La Calle and the newspaper Inti, Busch composed a press organ that could dispute the established interpretation of events alleged by elite-controlled publications for the first time in the country's modern history. Returning to the center of the political struggle, Montenegro joined with other young socialists: Víctor Paz Estenssoro, Hernán Siles Zuazo, Wálter Guevara, Augusto Céspedes, Germán Monroy Block, and Rafael Otazo. Together, they formed a new political party in 1941, formalized in 1942, dubbed the Revolutionary Nationalist Movement (MNR).

Realizing the threat posed by this burgeoning movement, the Rosca (Note: La Rosca (English: The Chain). In Bolivia, this is an expression designating the mining oligarchy, whose corporations, owned by the three "tin barons" (Simón Iturri Patiño, Moritz "Mauricio" Hochschild, and Carlos Víctor Aramayo), collectively controlled all the most important mines in the country, granting them a high degree of economic and political influence over state affairs.) —assisted by an alliance of traditional political interests under the Concordance banner— enacted a policy of active repression against the MNR's adherents. In July 1941, President Enrique Peñaranda received a fabricated note from U.S. Minister Plenipotentiary Douglas Jenkins alleging a plot between German Minister Ernst Wendler and Bolivian military attaché in Berlin Elías Belmonte to launch a coup d'état against the government. The president used the so-called "Nazi Putsch" as a basis to declare a state of siege on 19 July. Using the powers allotted to it by this, the government closed the three MNR periodicals and arrested prominent party members, including Montenegro, Céspedes, and Guevara. For four months they were confined in San Ignacio de Velasco, near the border with Brazil.

=== Villarroel government ===
On 20 December 1943, Peñaranda was ousted by a coup d'état led by military officers of the Reason for the Fatherland (RADEPA) military lodge and leading figures of the MNR. The ensuing civil-military junta headed by Colonel Gualberto Villarroel included Montenegro among its ranks, assigned to the agriculture, livestock, and colonization portfolio. However, the United States' lingering association of the MNR with fascism led Washington to refuse to recognize the new government, initiating a diplomatic boycott against it. In its attempt to affirm its commitment to good relations with the US, the Villarroel government dismissed both Montenegro and Céspedes on 11 February 1944. After that, in late 1944, Montenegro was appointed ambassador to Mexico and was a delegate to the III Inter-American Labor Conference in 1946. When the Villarroel government fell on 21 July 1946, Montenegro once again took refuge in Argentina.

== Final years and death ==
After six years in exile, together with other heads of the MNR, he returned to Bolivia in the wake of the Bolivian National Revolution. He was appointed ambassador to Chile by President Víctor Paz Estenssoro but never came to take office. As a result of his delicate state of health, he was interned at a hospital in New York City, where he died on 10 March 1953 at the age of forty-nine.

== Publications ==
- Montenegro, Carlos (1938). Frente al derecho del Estado el oro de la Standard Oil (in Spanish). La Paz: Editorial Trabajo.
- ————————— (1938). Caducidad de concesiones mineras (in Spanish). Editorial Cuadernos.
- ————————— (1943). Nacionalismo y coloniaje | su expresión histórica en la prensa de Bolivia (in Spanish). La Paz: Ediciones Autonomía. ISBN 978-99974-62-04-6.
- ————————— (1962). Las inversiones extranjeras en América Latina (in Spanish). Ediciones Coyoacán.

Political offices
Preceded by Julio Céspedes Añez	Minister of Agriculture, Livestock, and Colonization; 1943–1944	Succeeded by Rafael Otazo
