= 1944 Bolivian legislative election =

For the Constituent Assembly

Constituent Assembly elections were held in Bolivia on 2 July 1944.

== Results ==
Party	Seats	+/–
Revolutionary Nationalist Movement	56	+46
Independent Socialist Party	16	New
Liberal Party	14	–20
United Socialist Party	8	–20
Revolutionary Left Party	8	+1
Socialist Republican Party	4	–27
Genuine Republican Party	2	–14
Independents	29	+20
Total	137	0
Source: Political Handbook of the World 1946

== Aftermath ==
On 4 August 1944 the Constituent Assembly confirmed President Gualberto Villarroel López, who had assumed the presidency on 20 December 1943 as a result of a coup d'état.

== See also ==
- Bolivian Constituent Assembly, 1944–1946
