= Cabinet of Wálter Guevara =

Bolivia's presidential cabinet formed August 1979

Wálter Guevara Arze was inaugurated on 8 August 1979 as Provisional President of Bolivia and formed his cabinet on 9 August 1979.

Ministry / Date	09.08.1979	13.08.1979	12.10.1979
Foreign and Religious Affairs	Gustavo Fernández Saavedra, ind		
Interior, Migration and Justice	Jaime Aranibar Guevara, PRA		
National Defense	Ismaél Saavedra Sandoval, mil		Julio Herrera, mil
Planning and Co-ordination	Carlos Miranda Pacheco, ind		
Finance	Guido Hinojosa C., ind		
Education and Culture	Mariano Baptista Gumucio, MNR		
Transport, Communications and Aviation	Raúl Anze Tapia, ind		
Labor and Union Affairs	Mario Calderón Mendieta, PRA		
Industry, Commerce and Tourism	vacancy	Tomás Guillermo Elío, PSD	
Mining and Metallurgy	Hugo Zapata, ind		Oscar Bonifaz Gutierrez, PDC
Energy and Hydrocarbons	Jorge O'Connor D'Arlach, MIR		
Agriculture and Peasant Affairs	Carmelo Caballero Contreras, ind		
Health and Social Security	Jorge Abularach, ind		
Housing and Urbanism	vacancy	Guillermo Arroyo Rodríguez, ind	
Economic Integration	Fernándo Gutierrez Moscoso, ind		
Press and Information	Enrique Rocha Monrroy, ind		Ana Maria Romero de Campero, ind
Secretary to the Cabinet	vacancy	René Canelas López, ind	Fernando Aguirre Bastos, ind
Social Affairs	no	no	René Canelas López, ind

PRA – Authentic Revolutionary Party

MNR – Revolutionary Nationalist Movement

PDC – Christian Democratic Party

MIR – Revolutionary Left Movement

PSD – Social Democratic Party

mil – military

ind – independent
