= Partido Socialista Independiente =

Partido Socialista Independiente may refer to:

- Independent Socialist Party (Bolivia)
- Independent Socialist Party (1944), also in Bolivia
- Also Spain (defunct)
