= Government Junta of Bolivia (1943–1944) =

Civil-military junta ruling Bolivia (1943–1944)

The Government Junta of Bolivia (Spanish: Junta de Gobierno) was a civil-military junta which ruled Bolivia from 20 December 1943 through 5 April 1944. It consisted of representatives of the armed forces through the Reason for Fatherland (RADEPA) military lodge as well as members of the Revolutionary Nationalist Movement (MNR). The President of the Junta was Colonel Gualberto Villarroel who came to power after a coup d'état which overthrew the government of Enrique Peñaranda. Immediately upon its inception, the junta faced a diplomatic blockade by the United States who viewed the MNR as sympathetic to the fascist powers of World War II and as such led the rest of Latin America in refusing to recognize the new regime until all members of the MNR were removed from the administration. After months of attempted negotiations and the removal of several cabinet ministers, the government finally relented and dismissed all remaining MNR members, dissolving the junta and entrusting Villarroel with the provisional Presidency of the Republic on 5 April 1944.

== Formation ==
=== 1943 coup d'état ===
By late 1942, the conservative government of President Enrique Peñaranda had become increasingly unpopular. The continued escalation of opposition ultimately resulted in the Catavi massacre in which anywhere from 19 to 400 striking miners were shot by the military on 21 December 1942. The massacre was the breaking point in the deteriorating relations between the government and the left-wing opposition led by the Revolutionary Nationalist Movement. In response, the MNR aligned itself with the RADEPA military lodge, formed from left-wing young officers sympathetic to the Military Socialist governments of David Toro and Germán Busch. Almost exactly a year after the massacre at Catavi, on 20 December 1943, the MNR and RADEPA launched a coup d'état which ousted President Peñaranda from office.

=== Formation ===
Following the coup, a civil-military junta was established, composed of representatives of RADEPA and the MNR. The leader of the latter group was Víctor Paz Estenssoro who served as the main MNR representative in the junta through his position as Minister of Finance. Meanwhile, the journalist Augusto Céspedes served as the Secretary-General of the Junta. Other MNR militants were appointed to key ministerial positions within the new administration. While the MNR maintained an influential role in the junta administration, the presidency of the junta came under the control of Colonel Gualberto Villarroel of RADEPA. The portfolios of Government and National Defense were also given to RADEPA military officers Alberto Taborga and José Celestino Pinto.

=== U.S. diplomatic crisis ===
An immediate crisis facing the newly installed junta was that of the reaction of the United States to the new government. The U.S. had enjoyed good relations with Peñaranda who had brought the country into World War II on the Allied side and had pledged the country's valuable tin resources to the war effort. While Paz Estenssoro assured that "the new Government does not alter Bolivia's international position at the side of the United Nations," the State Department nevertheless immediately suspended diplomatic relations and refused to recognize the legitimacy of the junta.

The U.S. suspected the MNR of fascist sympathies, with Ambassador Pierre de Lagarde Boal reporting that he believed it probable that the MNR had received military and financial support from German and Japanese firms in La Paz as well as from Argentina. On 10 January, Secretary of State Cordell Hull issued a memorandum to the other Latin American republics outlining the MNR as a "pro-fascist political party" and RADEPA as a group of "young army officers [...] under Nazi influence." It further reported that "Members of the Junta receive financial support from pro-Nazi sources. [...] Three million bolivianos were secured from German and Argentine sources for the revolt." As such by 28 January 1944, all 19 governments (except Argentina) participating in consultation regarding the new regime had refused to recognize the junta.

== Dissolution ==
The U.S. maintained heavy diplomatic and economic pressure on the junta for the remainder of its existence. The U.S. embassy refused all visas issued by the new government, technical assistance programs were suspended, and papers for Bolivian imports were not processed. In a bid to placate the U.S. government, President Villarroel dismissed three members of the junta on 11 February; Minister of Government Alberto Taborga as well as two top MNR officials, Secretary-General Augusto Céspedes and Minister of Agriculture Carlos Montenegro. They were replaced by Alfredo Pacheco, Wálter Guevara, and Rafael Otazo. Despite this, the U.S. maintained on 17 February that "it is not felt that these shifts have materially altered the character of the Junta."

Finally on 5 April 1944, the junta caved to U.S. pressure. The last MNR ministers; Secretary-General Guevara, Minister of Agriculture Otazo, and Minister of Finance Paz Estenssoro were all dismissed. Through a Decree of Law No. 0084, the junta then dissolved itself and appointed Gualberto Villarroel provisional President of the Republic under the pretext that the "call for elections for the formation of the Legislative and Executive Powers has started the process of Constitutionalization of the country."

== Members ==
Junta President

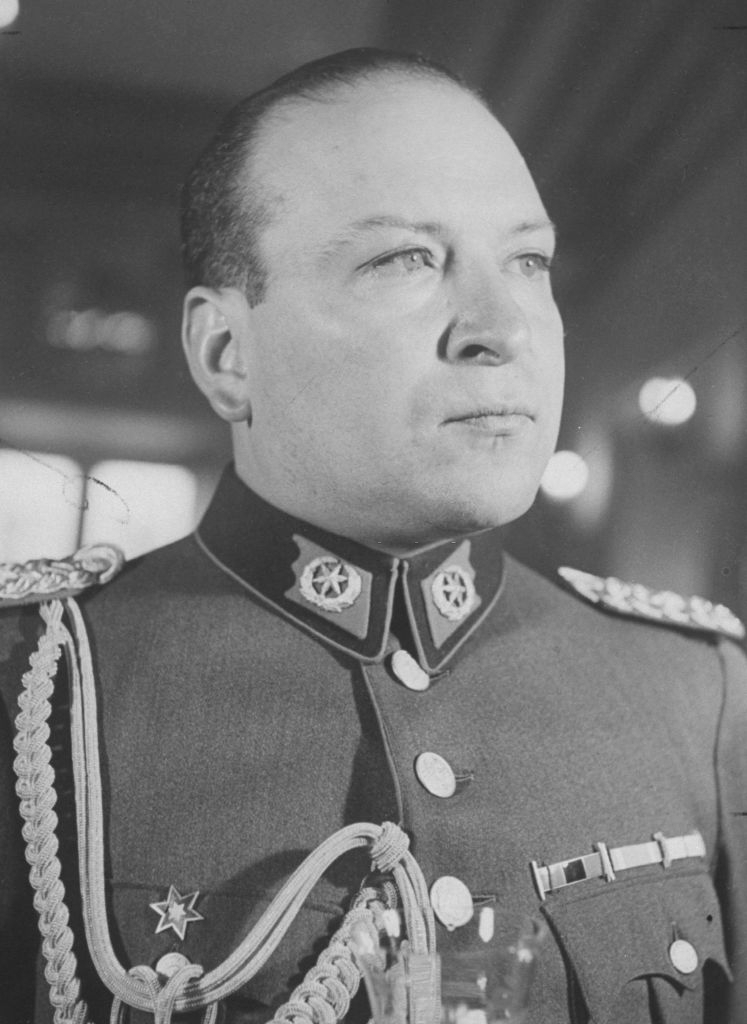
Gualberto Villarroel

Secretary-General

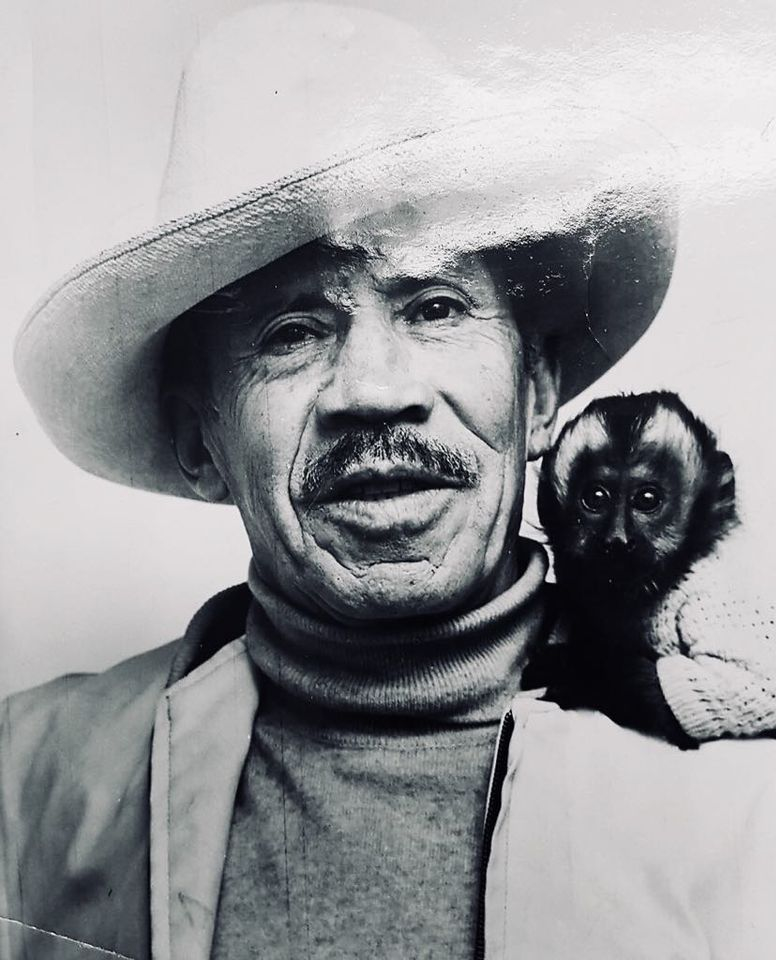
Augusto Céspedes,
from 20 December 1943

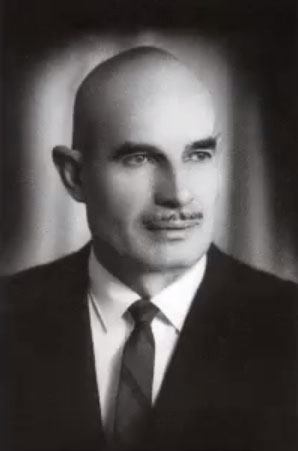
Wálter Guevara,
from 11 February 1944

Government Junta of Bolivia 1943–1944
Office	Minister	Representing	Term	Days
President	Gualberto Villarroel	RADEPA	20 December 1943 – 5 April 1942	107
Secretary-General of the Junta	Augusto Céspedes	MNR	20 December 1943 – 11 February 1944	53
Secretary-General of the Junta	Wálter Guevara	MNR	11 February 1944 – 5 April 1944	54
Minister of Foreign Affairs and Worship (Chancellor)	José Tamayo Solares	PSI	20 December 1943 – 16 March 1944	87
Minister of Foreign Affairs and Worship (Chancellor)	Enrique Baldivieso	PSI	16 March 1944 – 5 April 1944	20
Minister of Government, Justice, and Immigration	Alberto Taborga	RADEPA	20 December 1943 – 11 February 1944	107
Minister of Government, Justice, and Immigration	Alfredo Pacheco	RADEPA	11 February 1944 – 5 April 1944	54
Minister of National Defense	José Celestino Pinto	RADEPA	20 December 1943 – 5 April 1944	107
Minister of Finance and Statistics	Víctor Paz Estenssoro	MNR	20 December 1943 – 5 April 1944	107
Minister of Economy	Gustavo Chacón	Ind.	20 December 1943 – 5 April 1944	107
Minister of Public Works and Communications	Antonio Ponce	RADEPA	20 December 1943 – 5 April 1944	107
Minister of Work, Hygiene, and Social Security	Víctor Andrade Uzquiano	Ind.	20 December 1943 – 5 April 1944	107
Minister of Education, Fine Arts, and Indigenous Affairs	Jorge Calero	RADEPA	20 December 1943 – 5 April 1944	107
Minister of Agriculture, Livestock, and Colonization	Carlos Montenegro	MNR	20 December 1943 – 11 February 1944	53
Minister of Agriculture, Livestock, and Colonization	Rafael Otazo	MNR	11 February 1944 – 5 April 1944	54

== See also ==
- Cabinet of Gualberto Villarroel
- Military Socialism

== Bibliography ==
- Gisbert, Carlos D. Mesa (2003). Presidentes de Bolivia: entre urnas y fusiles : el poder ejecutivo, los ministros de estado (in Spanish). Editorial Gisbert.
- Blasier, Cole. The United States, Germany, and the Bolivian Revolutionaries (1941-1946).
