= Colquiri mine =

Bolivian tin-zinc mine

- Location within Bolivia

Location
- Location: La Paz Department, Bolivia; 17°23′30.3″S 67°7′31.37″W

Production
- Products: Tin and Zinc concentrates

Owner
- Company: Comibol
- Website: http://www.colquiri.gob.bo/

The Colquiri mine is an underground tin-zinc mine located in the western part of Bolivia in La Paz Department. Colquiri is the smaller of the two tin mines owned by the state mining company, Comibol, the other being the Huanuni tin mine near Oruro.
