= 1944–1946 Bolivian National Convention =

The Bolivian Constituent Assembly 1944–1946 was elected on 2 July 1944.

== Chamber of Deputies ==
Deputy no
Abel Reyes Ortiz	PSU	Beni
Abelardo Villalpando Retamozo	PIR	Potosí
Adolfo Torres Carpió	???	Potosí
Alberto Lavadenz Ribera	MNR	Pando
Alberto Mendoza López	PSI	La Paz
Alberto Salinas López	PSU	Chuquisaca
Alfonso Finot	MNR	La Paz
Alfredo Mendizábal	PIR	Cochabamba
Angel Balcázar	PSI	Beni
Angel Mendizábal	PL	Oruro
Anibal Zamorano	MNR	Cochabamba
Antonio Munguia	PSU	Beni
Ariel Morales	MNR	Chuquisaca
Augusto Céspedes Patzi	MNR	Potosí
Augusto Guzmán	PSI	Cochabamba
Bailón Rivera	MNR	Pando
Camilo Marin Murillo	???	La Paz
Carlos Ibáñez	???	Santa Cruz
Carlos Morales Avila	MNR	Tarija
Carmelo Céspedes	???	Potosí
Ceferino Mercado	MNR	Santa Cruz
Crisanto Valverde	PL	Beni
Custodio Machicao	???	La Paz
Daniel Bailón Saravia	???	La Paz
Daniel Bedregal	Ind.	La Paz
Donato Millán	???	La Paz
Edmundo Roca	MNR	Santa Cruz
Eduardo Arze Quiroga	MNR	Cochabamba
Emigdio Alcalá	???	Potosí
Emilio Carvajal	MNR	Oruro
Enrique Bánzer	???	Pando
Enrique Costas	MNR	Potosí
Enrique Herrero	???	Oruro
Ernesto Segundo Villarreal	MNR	Oruro
Eufronio Hinojosa	MNR	Cochabamba
Eulogio Ruíz	???	Tarija
Felipe Mendieta Santiváñez	???	Chuquisaca
Felipe Middgah	MNR	Santa Cruz
Félix Eguino Zaballa	PSU	La Paz
Francisco Cors	???	Oruro
Francisco Mealla Ruíz	MNR	Tarija
Franz Tamayo	PRG	La Paz
Germán Chávez	PL	Pando
Germán Monroy Block	MNR	La Paz
Gil Coimbra	???	Beni
Gilfredo Cortéz Candia	PSI	Beni
Gregorio Mendizábal	???	Chuquisaca
Gualberto Olmos Arrazolc	MNR	Cochabamba
Gualberto Pedrazas	PIR	Potosí
Gualberto Terrazas	???	Pando
Gumercindo Villarroel	???	Cochabamba
Heberto Añez	MNR	Santa Cruz
Héctor Fernández	MNR	Cochabamba
Heriberto Trigo Paz	PIR	Tarija
Hernán Flor Medina	???	Cochabamba
Hernán Siles Zuazo	MNR	La Paz
Hugo Bohórquez Ramírez	PIR	Potosí
Hugo Pizarro Aráoz	???	Tarija
Humberto Duchén	PL	Potosí
Isaac Salazar	PSU	La Paz
Isaías Landívar Serrate	???	Santa Cruz
Israel Camacho	???	La Paz
Jorge Aráoz Campero	MNR	Tarija
Jorge Velarde Cronembold	???	Santa Cruz
José Alberto Villegas	???	Potosí
José Antonio Arze	PIR	La Paz
José Armando Torrico	???	Chuquisaca
José Enrique Peña	???	Cochabamba
José Fausto Reinaga	MNR	Potosí
José Manuel Pando	PL	Potosí
José María Rivera	???	Chuquisaca
José Ramírez Velarde	???	Cochabamba
José Rosa Torrico	???	Cochabamba
Juan Arancibia	???	Chuquisaca
Juan Manuel Hurtado	???	Beni
Julián Montellano	MNR	Oruro
Julio Alvarado	PL	Chuquisaca
Julio Zuazo Cuenca	PSI	La Paz
Luis Iturralde Chinel	PSI	La Paz
Luis Ponce Lozada	PRG	Cochabamba
Mario Flores	???	Santa Cruz
Maximiano Rodríguez	???	Beni
Modesto Garnica	???	Oruro
Napoleón Bilbao Rioja	???	Potosí
Octavio Lazo de la Vega	???	Potosí
Oscar Donoso López	MNR	Tarija
Oscar Mealla Avilés	???	Tarija
Oswaldo Gutiérrez	PSI	Santa Cruz
Ovidio Barbery Justiniano	MNR	Santa Cruz
Pablo Saucedo Barbery	PL	Pando
Pedro Zilveti Arce	PRS	Chuquisaca
Rafael Cardenio Campos	???	Chuquisaca
Rafaél Otazo Vargas	MNR	La Paz
Raúl Laguna Lozada	PSU	Chuquisaca
Raúl Otero Reiche	MNR	Santa Cruz
Raúl Tovar Villa	MNR	Chuquisaca
Ricardo Anaya Arze	PIR	Cochabamba
Roberto Jordán Cuéllar	PSU	Pando
Rodolfo Landívar Serrate	PL	Santa Cruz
Rodolfo Palenque	MNR	Oruro
Rodolfo Soriano	PSU	Cochabamba
Rodolfo Villafuerte	MNR	La Paz
Romelio Salvador	???	Potosí
Secundino Ugarte	???	Tarija
Teodoro Mercado Z.	MNR	Cochabamba
Tomás Chávez Lobatón	ind	La Paz
Urbano Escobar	???	Cochabamba
Vito Prado	MNR	Santa Cruz
Waldo Belmonte Pool	PRS	La Paz
Walter Guevara Arce	MNR	Potosí

== Chamber of Senators ==
Senator	Party	Department
Abel Pacheco	PL	Pando
Alfredo Jordán	PL	Pando
Antonio Velasco Avila	PSI	Beni
Arturo Pacheco	MNR	La Paz
Atilio Molina Pantoja	MNR	Tarija
Bernardo Navajas Trigo	PL	Tarija
Dionisio Foianini	MNR	Santa Cruz
Eduardo Salinas Baldivieso	MNR	Oruro
Enrique Aponte	MNR	Santa Cruz
Fabio Soria Galvarro	???	Potosí
Félix Capriles	PSU	Cochabamba
Gabriel Palenque	PL	Oruro
Guillermo Alborta	MNR	Oruro
José Ferrufino	???	Cochabamba
Jose Luis Lanza	PL	La Paz
Julio Arauco Prado	PL	Cochabamba
Justino Daza Ondarza	???	Potosí
Lucas Saucedo Sevilla	???	Santa Cruz
Luis Calvo	PRG	Chuquisaca
Luis Saavedra Suárez	PSI	Beni
Mamerto Urriolagoitia	PSI	Chuquisaca
Manuel Frontaura Argandoña	???	Potosí
Napoleón Solares Arias	PL	Pando
Roberto Prudencio	MNR	La Paz
Román Rivera	PL	Chuquisaca
Rómulo Arano Peredo	PRS	Beni
Víctor Paz Estenssoro	MNR	Tarija

MNR – Revolutionary Nationalist Movement.

PL – Liberal Party.

PIR – Revolutionary Left Party.

PSU – United Socialist Party.

PRS – Socialist Republican Party.

PRG – Genuine Republican Party.

PSI – Independent Socialist Party.

ind – independent.
