= Antenor Patiño =

Bolivian businessman (1896–1982)

José Antenor Patiño
- Born: October 12, 1896; Oruro, Bolivia
- Died: February 2, 1982 (aged 86); New York City, United States of America
- Occupation: Businessman

José Antenor Patiño (12 October 1896, in Oruro, Bolivia – 2 February 1982, in New York City) was a Bolivian tycoon, heir to his father Simón I. Patiño, called "the King of Tin".

== Family ==
He married firstly in Paris, France on 8 April 1931 Doña María Cristina de Borbón y Bosch-Labrús (Madrid, 15 May 1913 – 28 July 2002), 3rd Duchess of Dúrcal, a relative of King of Spain Alfonso XIII. The couple had two daughters:

- Doña María Cristina Patiño y Borbón, 4th Duchess of Dúrcal (b. Paris, 2 August 1932), who married three times with:
  1. Marc Charles Louis Joseph Marie, 7th Prince of Beauvau-Craon (Paris, 3 February 1921 – Château d'Haroué, 21 November 1982) in Paris on 11 December 1952, later divorced. Had two daughters:
    - Princess Marie Isabelle de Beauvau-Craon (born 6 November 1953) married first to Duncan Hugh McLaren in 1978, without issue, and secondly in 1986 to Javier Botana, nephew of Natalio Botana, with issue.
    - Princess Marie Diane de Beauvau-Craon (born 20 August 1955) was married to Ahmed Mohamadialal. She and Ahmed Mohamadialal were divorced in 1985. Have issue.
  2. Ernst Schneider, and had one daughter:
    - Maria Christine Schneider (born 1963) married Patrick-Olivier Picourt in 1987.
  3. Kristo Kurteff, without issue.
- Doña María Isabel Patiño y Borbón (Paris, 3 June 1936 – Neuilly-sur-Seine, Paris, 15 May 1954) who had a short and tragic marriage with:
  - Sir James Goldsmith (Paris, 26 February 1933 – Benahavís, Spain, 18 July 1997; married January 1954), by whom she had one daughter:
    - Isabel Goldsmith (born 1954) married Arnaud de Rosnay in 1973. She and de Rosnay were divorced in 1975, without issue.

He married secondly in London, Middlesex, on 8 January 1960 Contessa Beatriz di Rovasenda née de Rivera y Digeon (1911–2009), former wife of Piedmontese Count Giovanni Lodovico di Rovasenda (1905–1986), without issue. From this marriage he had two stepdaughters, born from Beatriz's first marriage to Conte di Rovasenda:

- donna Isabella Manuela di Rovasenda (b. Lisbon, Portugal, 20 June 1936). She married Count Henri-Jean de Castellane in 1960 and they divorced in 1979. Have issue.
- donna Maria Elena di Rovasenda. She married Pierre Le Blan in February 1956. They later divorced.

== Business ==
In 1947, he made a successful effort to rid his company of organized labor. The Bolivian Revolution of 1952 nationalised Patiño's mines and it is claimed that his heir Antenor Patiño had his hand in the military coup that deposed the leader of the revolution, then President Víctor Paz Estenssoro, in the 1960s.

With his fortune, amongst other things, he developed tourist destinations like Las Hadas, in Manzanillo, Mexico, (where the movie 10 starring actress Bo Derek was filmed) and Las Alamandas in Jalisco state, also in Mexico.
