= Huanuni tin mine =

Tin mine in Huanuni, Bolivia

Coordinates: 18°17′02.94″S 66°49′39.05″W

The Huanuni tin mine is a large Bolivian mine situated about 60 km south of Oruro, Bolivia, on the way to the famous Villa Imperial de Potosí, as the city was and is known since colonial times. The mine is situated in Bolivia's tin mining heartland and is the sister mine of the Colquiri mine tin-zinc mine. It was originally owned at the turn of the 20th century by Don Vicko Orlandini (Don Vincenzo Orlandini), who was a member of one of Bolivia's famous tin mining families and also owner of El Porvenir-Cataricahua, in Huanuni, Oruro, Bolivia. The Huanuni mine was later sold to Simón Iturri Patiño, a well-known tin baron.

The mine was discovered by chance in the 19th century and was mined for a long time using simple tools; the means of transport were donkeys. From 1930 to the late 1940s the Huanuni mine took Catavi mine's title of the largest underground tin mine in the world. The Huanuni mine retained this title until the end of the 20th century. Thousands of Bolivian mine workers still go underground every day.

Using traditional mining methods, the average lifespan of a mine worker from the local community was traditionally 46 years. Lifespan and pay have since increased dramatically, as average lifespan has increased to over 60 years. Currently, the Huanuni Mine is still Bolivia's largest underground tin mine and the world's richest cassiterite deposit.

== See also ==
- Geology of Bolivia
