= Augusto Céspedes =

Bolivian writer and politician (1904–1997)

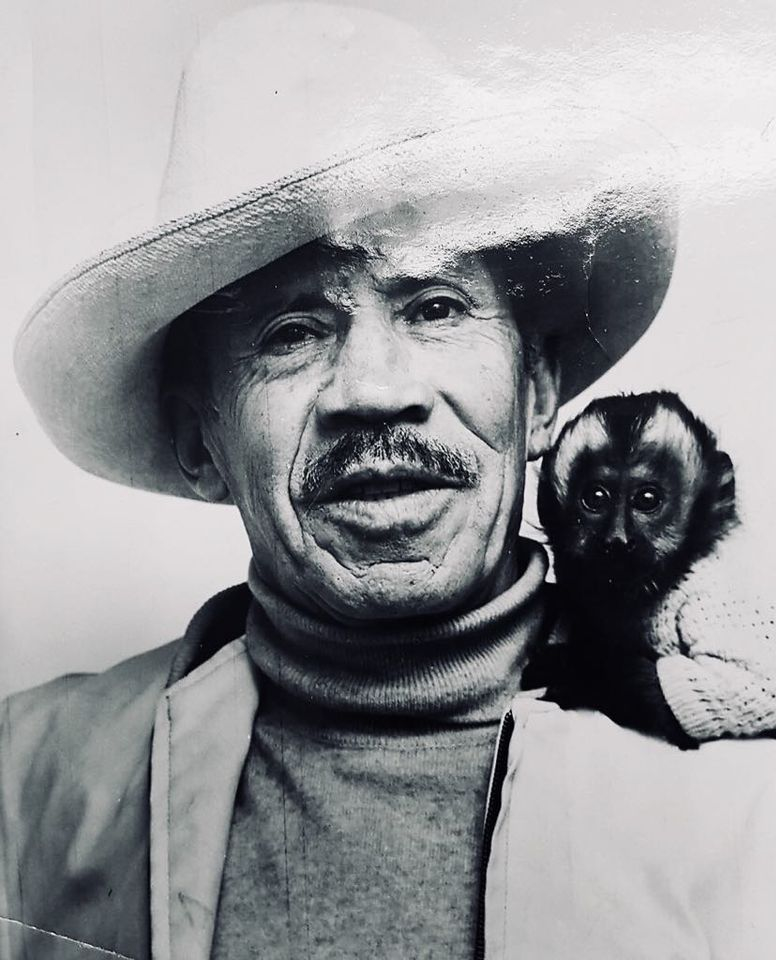
- Augusto Céspedes with a Capuchin monkey

Secretary-General of the Junta
- In office 20 December 1943 – 11 February 1944
- President: Gualberto Villarroel
- Preceded by: Office established
- Succeeded by: Wálter Guevara

Deputy of the National Convention
- In office 23 May 1938 – 24 April 1939
- Constituency: Cochabamba

Personal details
- Born: Augusto Céspedes Patzi; 6 February 1904 Cochabamba, Bolivia
- Died: 11 May 1997 (aged 93) La Paz, Bolivia
- Party: Revolutionary Nationalist Movement
- Spouse: Matilde Garvía
- Parent(s): Pablo Céspedes; Adriana Patzi Iturri
- Education: Higher University of San Andrés

Augusto Céspedes Patzi (6 February 1904, Cochabamba – 9 May 1997, La Paz) was a Bolivian writer, politician, diplomat, and journalist. He was the brother-in-law of writer Carlos Montenegro.

== Career ==
Céspedes studied law and received his degree in La Paz.

In 1927, he was a founder of the Nationalist Party. He was a leader in the Revolutionary Nationalist Movement (MNR).

He worked as a journalist on the front in the Chaco War, writing for the newspaper El Universal. He made use of his experiences on the front lines to write the stories in his 1936 collection, Sangre de Mestizos, which included his frequently anthologized short story, El Bozo. His non-fiction reports were compiled and published in the book Crónicas heroicas de una guerra estúpida, published in 1975. He also founded the MNR daily La Calle, directed the newspaper La Nación in La Paz and had an important role in Bolivian literature; he wrote various biographies of presidents such as Daniel Salamanca, Germán Busch Becerra, and Gualberto Villarroel. Among his many other stories and novels, Metal del Diablo, a fictionalized portrait of the tin tycoon, Simón I. Patiño has probably been the most successful.

He was a noted politician, serving as a deputy in Bolivian legislatures (three times: 1938, 1944, and 1956), and in diplomatic offices. He served as Bolivia's Ambassador to Paraguay in 1945, and to Italy in 1953, and distinguished himself as Ambassador to UNESCO.

== Selected works ==
- 1936: Sangre de Mestizos (short stories)
- 1946: Metal del diablo (novel)
- 1956: El dictador suicida (history)
- 1966: El presidente colgado (history)
- 1968: Trópico enamorado (novel)
- 1975: Crónicas heroicas de una guerra estúpida (journalism)

== Awards ==
- 1957: National Literature Prize
