= Hugo Zapata =

Colombian architect (1945–2025)

Hugo Zapata Hurtado (September 11, 1945 – June 3, 2025) was a Colombian architect, sculptor and visual artist.

== Life and career ==
Zapata was born in La Tebaida, and studied Art at the University of Antioquia in 1966. He specialized in architecture at the National University of Colombia in Medellín in 1972. From there he began his career as a sculptor with exhibitions in Germany, the United States, Argentina and France.

Zapata died on June 3, 2025, at the age of 79.
