= Simón Iturri Patiño =

Bolivian tin mining magnate and industrialist (1860–1947)

Simón Patiño
- Born: 1 June 1860; Santiváñez, Bolivia
- Died: 20 April 1947 (aged 86); Buenos Aires, Argentina
- Parent(s): María Patiño, Julio Abasto
- Relatives: María Patiño, Estefania Casique Patino, Antenor Patiño

Simón Iturri Patiño (1 June 1860 – 20 April 1947) was a Bolivian industrialist who was among the world's wealthiest people at the time of his death. With a fortune built from ownership of a majority of the tin industry in Bolivia, Patiño was nicknamed "The Andean Rockefeller". During World War II, Patiño was believed to be one of the five wealthiest men in the world.

== Biography ==
Patiño's biographers are not in agreement on the details of his early life. Many wrote that he was a cholo, with a mixed Quechua and Spanish heritage, and born to a poor mother, while his authorized biography holds that he was solely of European ancestry, and the son of a provincial leader. He was actually the illegitimate son of Julio Abasto and María Patiño from Cochabamba. Before entering the mining industry, he either managed a store in Oruro, or spent years in private schools.

Eventually, Patiño started in mining with Compañía Huanchaca de Bolivia, a silver company, and then with Fricke y Compañía. Patiño was assigned to collections for the store, and in 1894, he agreed to accept a deed of land in compromise for a $250 debt owed by a prospector. The deed turned out to be for the rocky side of a mountain, and Patiño was fired from his job for settling an account in exchange for a worthless piece of property. Legend has it that Patiño was forced to pay back the store from his own funds, and was stuck with his own bad bargain.

The mountain, located near Llallagua, turned out to be richer in minerals than anyone had imagined. Although the first several years of work yielded little, the turning point came in 1900 when Patiño located a very rich vein of tin, later called "La Salvadora" (The Savior). Over the next 10 years he built up the control of nearby mines and other important mines in Bolivia, including Catavi, Siglo XX, Uncia and Huanuni. By the 1920s he had also bought out Chilean interests in his mining company and went on to buy tin smelters in England and Germany. In 1924 Patiño restructured his assets, registering his best known company, Patiño Mines & Enterprise Consolidated Inc., in Delaware and merging into it his Bolivian mining and railroad assets. By the 1940s he controlled the international tin market and was one of the wealthiest men in the world, hence his "title" The Tin King (Rey del Estaño).

In his 2008 book Outliers, Canadian journalist Malcolm Gladwell estimated the total net worth of Simon I. Patiño around US$81.2 billion in 2008 dollars. That amount placed him in number 26 of all-time wealthiest individuals in human history, ahead of Bill Gates, Carlos Slim, Warren Buffett and J.P. Morgan.

Patiño had been living between Europe and Bolivia since around 1912. In 1924, following a heart attack, his doctors told him not to return to Bolivia and he moved abroad permanently, first to Paris, then to New York and finally to Buenos Aires where he died. While living in Paris he was appointed Minister to France and represented Bolivia in 1938 at the Évian Conference.

Previous to a political shift away from his allies in the government, Patiño had merged the company owning his Bolivian tin property with a British company active in Malaysia.

Patiño died in 1947 and was buried in the province of Cochabamba, high in the Bolivian mountains of his birth, in a white mausoleum.

== Family ==
Simón I. Patiño was married to Albina Rodriguez, with whom he had five children

- René
- Anténor
- Graziella (married to Jorge Ortiz-Linares, a Bolivian diplomat of aristocratic Spanish descent, Ambassador of Bolivia to France during and after the Second World War, parents of George and Jaime)
- Elena (married to José María López de Carrizosa y Martel, 3rd Marquess del Merito, Grandee of Spain)
- Luz Mila (married to French Count Guy du Boisrouvray, parents of Albina du Boisrouvray, mother of François-Xavier Bagnoud who was killed in a helicopter accident during the 1986 Paris–Dakar Rally, together with the singer Daniel Balavoine).

== Epilogue ==
The Bolivian Revolution of 1952 confiscated the Patiño Mines. It is claimed that Patiño's son, Antenor Patiño, had a hand in the military coup that deposed the leader of that revolution, the then President Víctor Paz Estenssoro, in the 1960s.

== See also ==
- Bolivian tin belt
- Huanuni tin mine
