= Wálter Guevara =

54th President of Bolivia (August–November 1979)

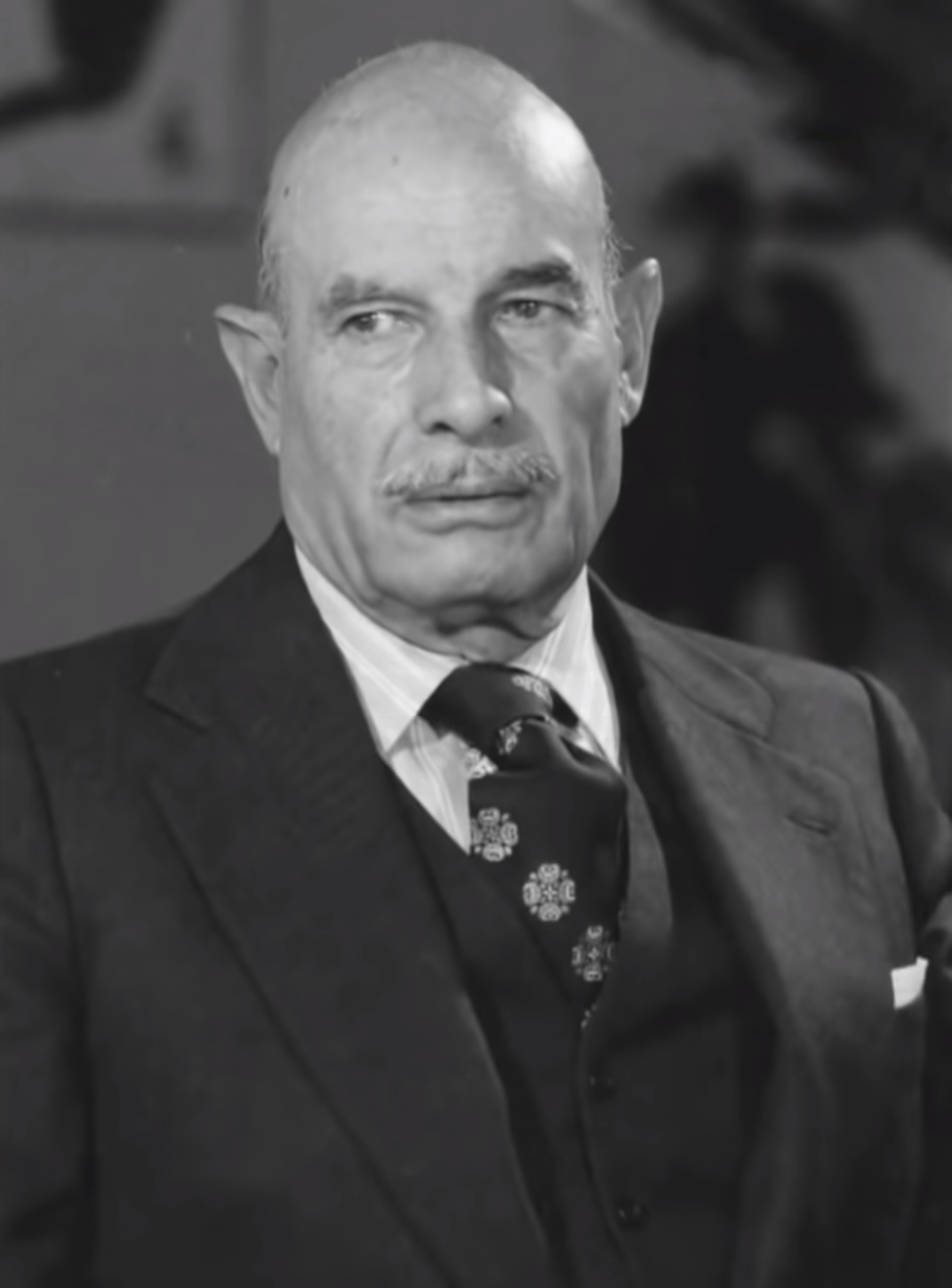

54th President of Bolivia
- Interim
- In office 8 August 1979 – 1 November 1979
- Vice President: Vacant
- Preceded by: David Padilla
- Succeeded by: Alberto Natusch

President of the Senate
- In office 19 November 1979 – 17 July 1980
- Preceded by: Leónidas Sánchez Arana
- Succeeded by: Julio Garrett Ayllón
- In office 2 August 1979 – 8 August 1979
- Preceded by: Julio Campero Trigo
- Succeeded by: Leónidas Sánchez Arana

Minister of Foreign Affairs and Worship
- In office 4 August 1967 – 7 February 1968
- President: René Barrientos
- Preceded by: Alberto Crespo Gutiérrez
- Succeeded by: Tomás Guillermo Elío Moldiz
- In office 14 November 1959 – 10 June 1960
- President: Hernán Siles Zuazo
- Preceded by: Víctor Andrade Uzquiano
- Succeeded by: Carlos Morales Guillén
- In office 12 April 1952 – 23 January 1956
- President: Víctor Paz Estenssoro
- Preceded by: Tomás Antonio Suárez
- Succeeded by: Manuel Barrau Peláez

Minister of Government, Justice, and Immigration
- In office 17 August 1958 – 12 November 1959
- President: Hernán Siles Zuazo
- Preceded by: Marcial Tamayo
- Succeeded by: Carlos Morales Guillén

Secretary-General of the Junta
- In office 11 February 1944 – 5 April 1944
- President: Gualberto Villarroel
- Preceded by: Augusto Céspedes
- Succeeded by: Office abolished

Personal details
- Born: Wálter Guevara Arze; 11 March 1912 Cochabamba, Bolivia
- Died: 20 June 1996 (aged 84) La Paz, Bolivia
- Party: Authentic Revolutionary Party (1960–c. 1980); Revolutionary Nationalist Movement (1942–1960; 1989–1996); Independent Socialist (1938–1942)
- Spouse(s): Lola Anaya; Rosa Elena Rodríguez Rivas
- Parent(s): Wálter Guevara; Victoria Arze
- Education: Higher University of San Andrés; University of Chicago
- Awards: Order of the Condor of the Andes; Order of Merit of the Federal Republic of Germany

Wálter Guevara Arze (11 March 1912 in Ayopaya Province, Cochabamba Department, Bolivia – 20 June 1996 in La Paz, Bolivia) was a Bolivian statesman, cabinet minister, writer, and diplomat, who served as the 54th president of Bolivia on an interim basis in 1979.

== Background and earlier career ==
Guevara was born in Ayopaya Province, Cochabamba Department on 11 March 1912. Trained as a lawyer and economist, he studied in the United States. He co-founded the Movimiento Nacionalista Revolucionario (MNR) in 1941, alongside Víctor Paz Estenssoro, Hernán Siles, and others. When the MNR came to power following the 1952 Bolivian Revolution, Guevara served as minister of foreign relations in the cabinet of President Paz Estenssoro (1952–56). He was then appointed Minister of Interior by President Siles (1956–60). Often seen as the third-highest leader in the MNR hierarchy (after Paz and Siles), the relatively conservative Guevara clashed repeatedly on ideological grounds with Juan Lechín and others associated with the Left wing of the party. Fully expecting to be the party's official candidate for president in 1960, he left it abruptly to form his own political organization when Paz Estenssoro decided to return to Bolivia and run for re-election. The party Guevara founded was the Partido Revolucionario Auténtico, in whose representation he ran for president in 1960, finishing second to Paz. In 1964, Guevara supported the military coup d'état that toppled the MNR from power, and once more served as Minister of Foreign Relations, this time to President René Barrientos.

The long years in exile following the establishment of the 1971-78 dictatorship of General Hugo Banzer brought Guevara closer to the main body of the MNR, by now divested of its more left-leaning elements, including Siles and Lechín. When democratic elections were called again in 1978, Guevara ran as Paz Estenssoro's vice-presidential running mate. Their ticket finished second. When that electoral contest was annulled due to evidence of fraud, a second one was held a year later. Guevara this time did not run on the main formula, but was elected Senator in representation of the MNR alliance. Soon, he was proclaimed President of the Senate by his peers. Since no presidential candidate in the 1979 elections had received the necessary 50% of the vote, it fell to Congress to decide who should be first executive. To the surprise of many, it could not agree on any candidate, no matter how many votes were taken. Positions hardened, and no solution seemed possible, until an alternative was offered in the form of the President of the Senate, Wálter Guevara, who was named temporary Bolivian president in August 1979 pending the calling of new elections in 1980.

== President of Bolivia ==
Guevara's tenure was short and difficult. Faced with a mounting economic and fiscal crisis, the new president declared that it might be advisable to extend his mandate by an extra year in order to allow him to confidently take the adequate measures. This was seen by many as a naked power grab and his popularity plummeted to the point that he had to resort to a purely technocratic cabinet in the absence of any congressional support. This impasse was taken advantage of by some conspiratorial members of the military, who were displeased with the fast pace, the tone, and the results of the democratic restoration.

=== Overthrow ===
On 1 November 1979, General Alberto Natusch surprisingly toppled President Guevara in a bloody coup d'état that was resisted by the urban population. Natusch did take possession, but not without considerable bloodshed. Moreover, the citizenry continued to resist, led by a nationwide labor strike called by the powerful Central Obrera Boliviana (COB) of Juan Lechín. In the end, Natusch was able to occupy the Palacio Quemado for only sixteen days, after which he was forced to give up his quixotic struggle. The only face-saving concession he extracted from Congress was the promise that Guevara not be allowed to resume his duties as president, but he was allowed to return as President of the Senate. This condition was accepted and a new provisional president was found in the leader of the lower congressional house (the House of Deputies), Lidia Gueiler.

== Later career ==
Guevara, although bitter by the strange circumstances that surrounded his ousting, resumed his position as president of the Senate on 19 November, and continued to support Paz Estenssoro in subsequent elections (1980, 1985). In 1982 he was appointed Bolivian Ambassador to Venezuela. In 1989 (already quite elderly) he again ran for office, this time as vice-presidential running mate to the MNR's Gonzalo Sánchez de Lozada. Although they received a majority of the votes, Sanchez and Guevara did not accede to the Quemado, as Congress selected as president the third-place finisher, Jaime Paz.

=== Retirement and death ===
Guevara then retired from public life and died in La Paz on 20 June 1996.

== See also ==
- Cabinet of Wálter Guevara

== Sources ==
- Mesa José de; Gisbert, Teresa; and Carlos D. Mesa, "Historia De Bolivia."

Political offices
Preceded by Augusto Céspedes	Secretary-General of the Junta; 1944	Succeeded by Office abolished
Vacant Title last held by Tomás Antonio Suárez	Minister of Foreign Affairs and Worship; 1952–1956	Succeeded by Manuel Barrau Peláez
Preceded by Marcial Tamayo	Minister of Government, Justice, and Immigration; 1958–1959	Succeeded by Carlos Morales Guillén
Preceded by Víctor Andrade Uzquiano	Minister of Foreign Affairs and Worship; 1959–1960	Succeeded by Carlos Morales Guillén
Preceded by Alberto Crespo Gutiérrez	Minister of Foreign Affairs and Worship; 1967–1968	Succeeded by Tomás Guillermo Elío Moldiz
Vacant Title last held by Julio Campero Trigo	President of the Senate; 1979	Succeeded by Leónidas Sánchez Arana
Preceded by Leónidas Sánchez Arana	President of the Senate; 1979–1980	Vacant Title next held by Julio Garrett Ayllón
Preceded by David Padilla	President of Bolivia; Interim; 1979	Succeeded by Alberto Natusch
Party political offices
Preceded by New political party	Authentic Revolutionary nominee for President of Bolivia; 1960	Succeeded by René Barrientos; Alliance
Preceded by New political alliance	Democratic Alliance of National Revolution nominee for Vice President of Bolivia; 1978	Succeeded by Alliance dissolved
Preceded by Víctor Paz Estenssoro; Alliance	Authentic Revolutionary nominee for President of Bolivia; 1980	Succeeded by Party dissolved
Preceded by Julio Garrett Ayllón	Revolutionary Nationalist Movement nominee for Vice President of Bolivia; 1989	Succeeded by Víctor Hugo Cárdenas
