= Julián Montellano =

Vice President of Bolivia from 1945 to 1946

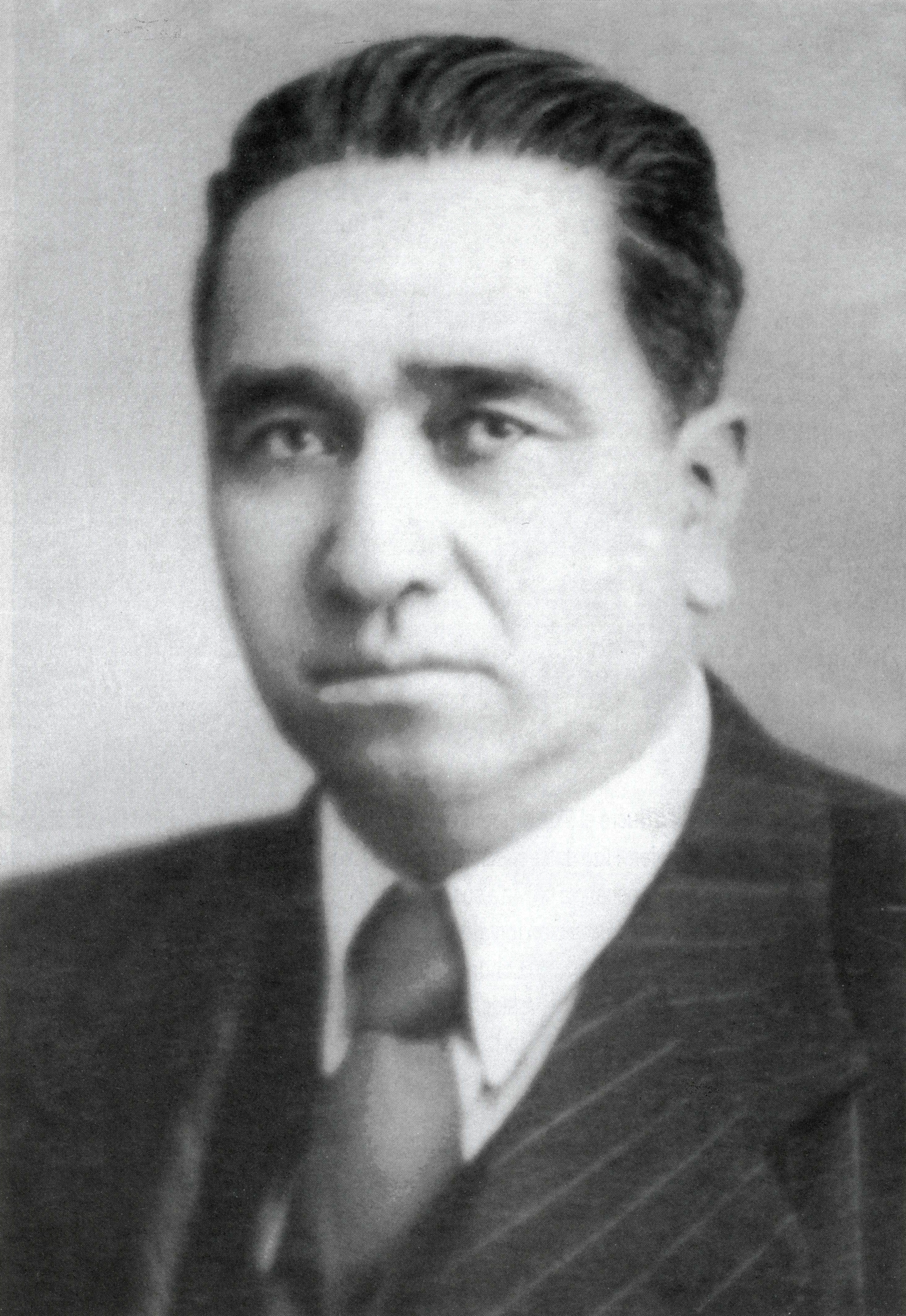
- Formal portrait, c. 1945–1946

25th Vice President of Bolivia
- In office 6 November 1945 – 21 July 1946
- President: Gualberto Villarroel
- Preceded by: Enrique Baldivieso
- Succeeded by: Mamerto Urriolagoitía

Personal details
- Born: Julián V. Montellano Carrasco; 27 October 1900 Camataquí, Chuquisaca, Bolivia
- Died: 24 May 1989 (aged 88) La Paz, Bolivia
- Party: Revolutionary Nationalist Movement
- Spouse: María Arana
- Parents: Julián Montellano; Clara Carrasco
- Education: University of San Francisco Xavier; Higher University of San Andrés
- Occupation: Lawyer; politician

Julián V. Montellano Carrasco (Note: In this Spanish name, the first or paternal surname is Montellano and the second or maternal family name is Carrasco.) (27 October 1900 – 24 May 1989) was a Bolivian lawyer and politician who served as the 25th vice president of Bolivia from 1945 to 1946 under Gualberto Villarroel.

== Publications ==
- Montellano Carrasco, Julián V. (1921). De lo nuestro (in Spanish). Sucre.
- —————————————— (1930). Las obligaciones en el derecho civil boliviano (in Spanish). La Paz: Imprenta Editorial Universo. OCLC 1047925866.
- ——————————————; Montellano, Carlos (1943). La justicia boliviana al servicio de la masonería (in Spanish). La Paz: Editorial Trabajo. OCLC 23928165.
- —————————————— (1954). Terror y angustia en el corazón de América (in Spanish). Santiago: Imprenta Gutenberg. OCLC 1022576953.
- —————————————— (1982). Filosofía de bolivianidad (in Spanish). La Paz. OCLC 38673673.

Political offices
Preceded by Enrique Baldivieso	Vice President of Bolivia; 1945–1946	Succeeded by Mamerto Urriolagoitía
