= Gualberto Villarroel =

39th President of Bolivia

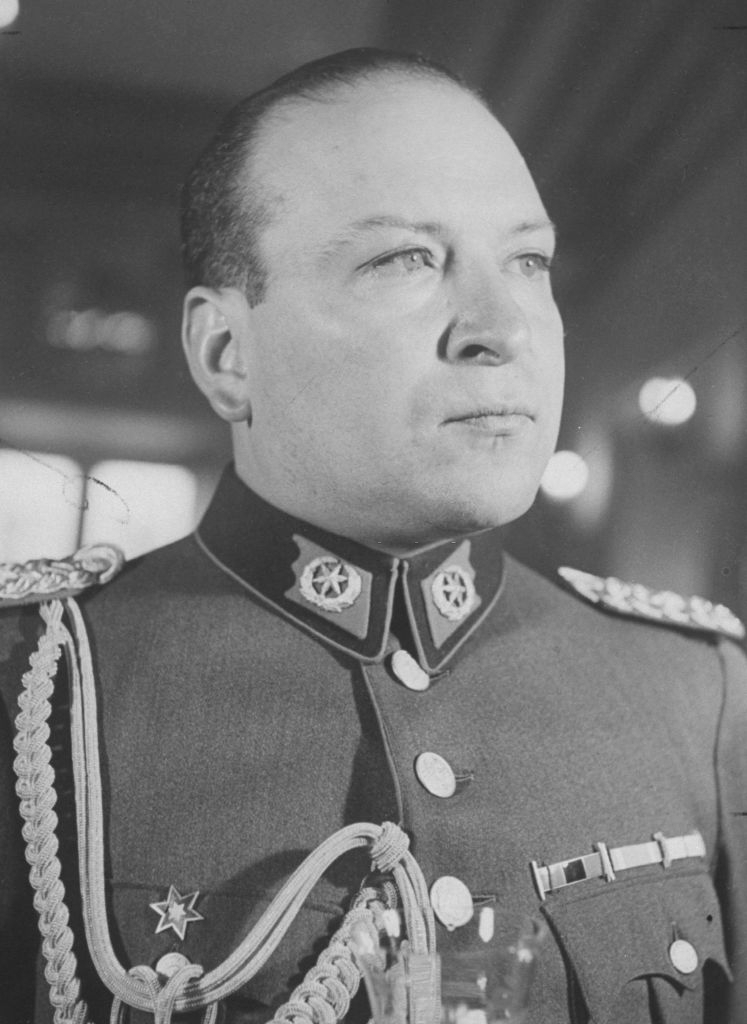

39th President of Bolivia
- In office 20 December 1943 – 21 July 1946; Provisional: 5 April 1944 – 6 August 1944; Junta: 20 December 1943 – 5 April 1944
- Vice President: None (1943–1945) (Note: Office abolished until November 1945.); Julián Montellano (1945–1946)
- Preceded by: Enrique Peñaranda
- Succeeded by: Néstor Guillén

Personal details
- Born: Gualberto Villarroel López; 15 December 1908 Villa Rivero, Cochabamba, Bolivia
- Died: 21 July 1946 (aged 37) La Paz, Bolivia
- Cause of death: Lynch mob
- Party: RADEPA (Note: Razón de Patria, or Fatherland's Cause (RADEPA), while not a political party, was a military faction of young officers inspired by the Military Socialist governments of David Toro and Germán Busch.)
- Spouse: Elena López
- Children: 2
- Parent(s): Enrique Casto Villarroel; María López
- Education: Military College of the Army

Military service
- Allegiance: Bolivia
- Branch/service: Bolivian Army
- Years of service: 1925–1935
- Rank: Colonel
- Unit: Pérez Tercero Infantry Regiment; 8th Ayacucho Infantry Regiment
- Battles/wars: Chaco War
- Awards: Order of the Condor of the Andes; Order of Abdon Calderón

Gualberto Villarroel López (15 December 1908 – 21 July 1946) was a Bolivian military officer who served as the 39th president of Bolivia from 1943 to 1946. A reformist, sometimes compared with Argentina's Juan Perón, he is nonetheless remembered for his alleged fascist sympathies and violent demise.

== Early life ==
Gualberto Villarroel was born on 15 December 1908 in Villa Rivero, Cochabamba Department. He was the son of Enrique Casto Villarroel and María López. At age 11, Villarroel's parents decided that provincial education was insufficient and enrolled him fiscal school and later into the Sucre National School in Cochabamba. He graduated in 1924, going on to enroll in the Military College of the Army in 1925, graduating with the rank of second lieutenant as part of the Pérez Tercero Infantry Regiment in 1928. A distinguished cadet, he was awarded the Order of Abdon Calderón for best student by the Ecuadorian government. In 1931, he rose to the rank of lieutenant.

=== Chaco War ===
Villarroel saw action in the Chaco War (1932–35) against Paraguay. He caught the attention of Hans Kundt, commander-in-chief of the army, who highlighted the young man's creativity in combat. As part of the 8th Ayacucho Infantry Regiment, he participated in the battles of Cañada Strongest and Ybybobó being promoted to captain in 1935. He also participated in the final defense of Villamontes in 1935.

After Bolivia's disastrous defeat in the conflict, he became convinced that the country needed profound structural changes and supported the progressive Military Socialist regimes of David Toro and Germán Busch. Following Busch's suicide in August 1939, conservative forces reasserted themselves, took power, and won the 1940 elections in which the traditional parties linked to the country's big mining interests triumphed at the polls with General Enrique Peñaranda.

== 1943 coup d'état ==
While the Peñaranda administration had managed to wrest control of government from the previous progressive political forces, it was unable to stop their spread. Villarroel became a member of RADEPA (Razón de Patria, or Fatherland's Cause), an open-military faction of young officers founded in 1934 by Bolivian prisoners of war in Paraguay. It sought mass support, backed military intervention in politics, and hoped to prevent excessive foreign control over Bolivia's natural resources.

Between September and December 1943, RADEPA secretly conspired with the newly formed Revolutionary Nationalist Movement (MNR) to overthrow Peñaranda. The consequences of the Catavi massacre on 21 December 1942 which caused the deaths of 19 striking miners would ultimately bring down the government. Before the coup, opposition leaders requested that the president resign. Peñaranda, in turn, evaded a response and ordered the immediate change of military assignments for the RADEPA leaders, thus removing them from the center of conflict. In response, the date of the coup was brought forward.

On 20 December 1943, the RADEPA-MNR alliance overthrew the government. Former economy minister Víctor Paz Estenssoro announced in a broadcast, "Bolivian people, the work of iniquity has ended. The nation has ceased to be the property of the Peñaranda Rivera Castillo family." Villarroel was allowed to take residence in the Palacio Quemado as de facto president while members of the MNR, including Paz Estenssoro, took various positions in his cabinet. At age 35, he was one of the youngest presidents in Bolivian history.

== President (1943–1946) ==
=== Fight for U.S. recognition ===
According to Bolivian journalist Augusto Céspedes, "The coup surprised no one more in Bolivia than the United States Ambassador." The U.S. government had enjoyed good relations with the Peñaranda administration which had brought Bolivia into World War II as an Allied Power and pledged the country's tin resources to the war effort. The fall of Peñaranda alarmed the State Department which immediately suspended diplomatic relations with Bolivia and refused to recognize the Villarroel government. In 1941, Peñaranda had used the fabricated story of a "Nazi Putsch" in Bolivia to suppress the MNR, causing the U.S. to suspect them of having pro-Nazi affiliations. Villarroel, in turn, was seen as "a Mussolini of the Andes" and a puppet of Buenos Aires. The government of Argentina under the fascist-leaning President Pedro Pablo Ramírez was the only government in Latin America to recognize Villarroel.

The newly installed Villarroel government within hours of its assumption to power sought to reassure the U.S. of its desire for good relations and support of the war effort. In an interview, Paz Estenssoro assured that "the new Government does not alter Bolivia's international position at the side of the United Nations." Negotiations over tin sales, vital to the Bolivian economy, rested on recognition by the United States. Hence, Villarroel's government committed to negotiations over the exclusive sale of quinine, the nationalization of German and Japanese companies, and a new tin contract at hopefully higher prices.

Despite their efforts, the view by the U.S. that Villarroel and the MNR were, in fact, a pro-fascist regime resulted in Secretary of State Cordell Hull issuing a memorandum on 10 January describing their pro-Axis sympathies. By 28 January, all 19 American governments (except Argentina) had publicly refused recognition of the Villarroel regime. While on 11 February Villarroel removed three cabinet members including two top MNR leaders, Carlos Montenegro and Augusto Céspedes, the U.S. maintained that the composition of the revolutionary junta precluded recognition and that "it is not felt that these shifts have materially altered the character of the Junta."

Under the mounting weight of U.S. pressure, the remaining MNR ministers, Víctor Paz Estenssoro, Rafael Otazo, and Wálter Guevara resigned on 5 April 1944. Gualberto Villarroel received full command from the junta as de facto provisional president. Later that month, Minister of Labor Víctor Andrade publicly denied the charges of Nazism and called on the U.S. to recognize the new government. These events led the U.S. to send Avra M. Warren, U.S. Ambassador to Panama, to La Paz to give advice on recognition. On 23 May, Warren recommended the immediate recognition of the Villarroel government due to the fact that "there is now no MNR official in any position of prominence in Bolivia."

Víctor Paz Estenssoro would later claim that the main obstacle to U.S. recognition of the regime was the MNR's call for a ban on Jewish immigration to the country. While the U.S. saw it as a sign of antisemitism, Paz Estenssoro maintained his party's opposition was due to the "serious problems relating to subsistence and housing" it created. The MNR would return to Villarroel's cabinet, with Víctor Paz Estenssoro as Finance Minister, in late December 1944.

=== 1945 Indigenous Congress ===
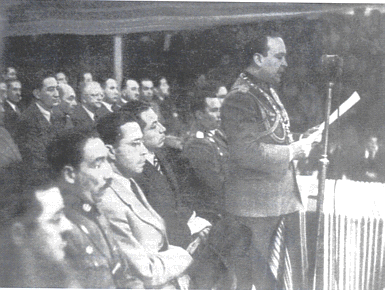
Villarroel at the opening of the Indigenous Congress, May 1945

Faced with enemies on both the left and right, Villarroel strove to build a base of support among the long marginalized indigenous populace of Bolivia. In November 1944, Villarroel repealed the law prohibiting indigenous people from entering the main squares of La Paz. Not long after, on the initiative of peasant leaders such as Francisco Chipana Ramos, the president agreed to sponsor a fully indigenous congress to be held in early 1945. The government gave credentials to some 1200 community delegates and settlers to attend the congress. Between 10 and 15 May 1945, a combined group of 1500 delegates and their families would hold the First Indigenous Congress in Luna Park in La Paz.

The congress, led by its Aymara president Francisco Chipana and Quechua vice president Dionsio Miranda, would result in important legal reforms among the indigenous community. Namely, the congress brought forth the abolition of the pongueaje, an obligatory form of unpaid servitude by indigenous peasants in haciendas. Also abolished were "personal services" such as domestic service and transporting and selling a landlord's produce which came in addition to cultivating fields. The abolition of pongueaje also saw the end of state authorities illegally including jobs such as mail delivery within the domestic servant system.

The emphasis by the press on the "authentic native" dress, language and rural labor, marked the indigenous peoples as a distinct group within the Bolivian nation. Though he worked closely with Villarroel's government during the congress, Chipana presented the event as controlled by the delegates themselves while sidelining more radical demands for redistribution of the land. Despite this, the conservative landlords refused to accept even Villarroel's moderate changes to the labor regime, but ongoing indigenous peasant mobilization would enforce the new laws.

Portrait of Villarroel as president by Luis Walpher, 1954

=== National Convention of 1944–1945 ===
Villarroel called legislative elections to be held on 2 July 1944 which resulted in a clear victory for the MNR in the Constituent Assembly. In turn, the assembly proclaimed Gualberto Villarroel the constitutional President of the Republic on 5 August 1944. He formally accepted the title the following day. Villarroel enacted a number of far-reaching reforms, including official recognition of worker unions with the establishment of the Federation of Miners, the beginning of construction of the nation's first oil refinery and the establishment of a retirement pension. Villarroel is quoted as once saying "I am not an enemy of the rich but I am more a friend of the poor."

In his push for further reforms, he called a National Convention to rewrite the constitution in 1944. As part of this process, the convention proclaimed Julián Montellano, an MNR member of the Chamber of Deputies from Oruro, vice president on 3 November 1945. Montellano took office three days later. That same month, the new constitution was sanctioned by the National Convention on 23 November and promulgated by Villarroel on 24 November. The Political Constitution of 1945 maintained the same formal structure and even number of sections, denominations, and articles as the 1938 Constitution promulgated during the presidency of Germán Busch, although with the introduction of further reforms.

=== Attacks on the opposition ===
The conservative backlash against Villarroel did not take long to appear, fed by the considerable resources of the private mining interests. Moreover, the workers themselves decided to exercise their new rights to protest to demand further concessions causing the government to adopt repressive measures to maintain control.

==== Shooting of José Antonio Arze ====
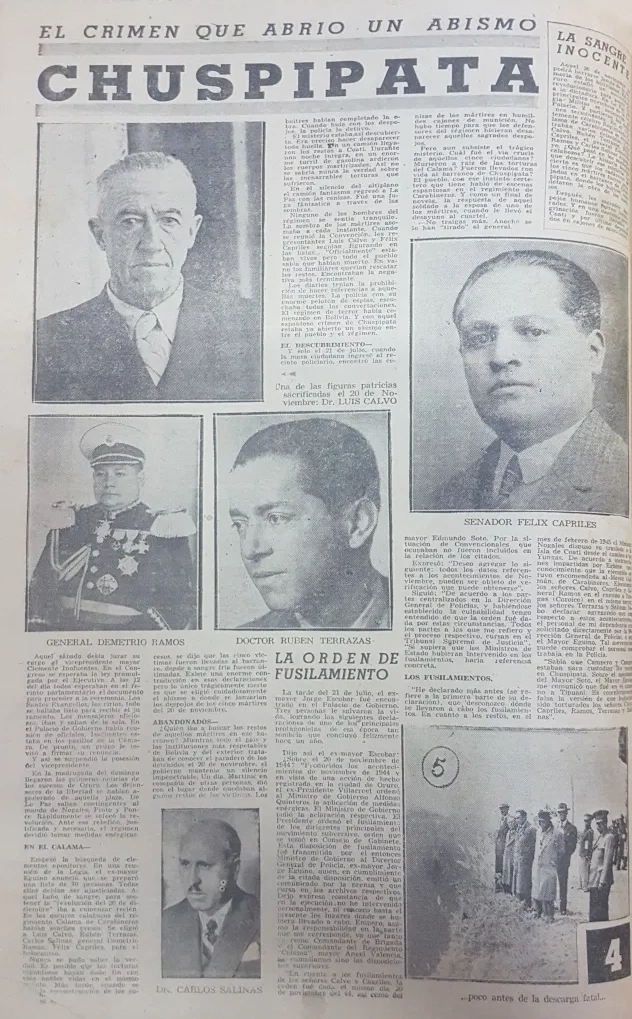
Three years after the executions, the newspaper La Razón printed a report on the victims of Chuspipata.

Allegedly among these repressions was the attempted assassination of José Antonio Arze, a prominent Bolivian sociologist and Marxist and head of the Revolutionary Left Party (PIR). While Arze had initially presented his sympathy for the 1943 coup, he refused to supply the Villarroel regime with civil support from the PIR unless the new government got rid of "fascist" elements. The result of this was his arrest and confinement for a few months after which he was released.

In La Paz in the early morning of 9 July 1944, an unknown assailant shot Arze twice outside his house. While one bullet missed his head by millimeters, the other lodged itself in his thorax, leaving him incapacitated and in hospital for several months. The attempt on the life of the influential leftist politician was a cause of grave concern among academics which, given the previous animosity between the two, suspected government involvement in the incident. In an attempt to push against this notion, a government delegation including Villarroel himself, accompanied by Foreign Minister Enrique Baldivieso, visited Arze at his hospital, showing concern for his health. A subsequent liability trial against the Villarroel regime failed to reach a concrete conclusion as to whether Villarroel or RADEPA had instigated the assassination attempt.

==== Kidnapping of Moritz Hochschild ====
In the same month as the shooting of José Antonio Arze, was the kidnapping of the prominent tin baron Moritz Hochschild. The mining businessman had been arrested in La Paz after being linked to a series of actions threatening the stability of the government months prior. However, on 30 July 1944, he had been cleared of all charges and released. The same day, he was intercepted by RADEPA agents while attempting to leave the country through the Chilean consulate. Hochschild's whereabouts were unknown for 17 days. The initial decision to eliminate him was reversed due to international pressure and the intervention of diplomatic representatives of Argentina, Chile, and the United States which ultimately secured Hochschild's release on 15 August.

==== Executions of Chuspipata and Challacollo ====
The harsh repressions on the opposition inevitably resulted in the development of a conspiracy to overthrow the government. The attempted coup in Oruro, headed by Colonel David Ovidio, resulted in failure and its perpetrators were arrested. Following this, the decision was made to impose the maximum penalty of death, without trial and without discretion on the conspirators. On the night of 19 November, four of the conspirators, Miguel Brito, Eduardo Paccieri, Fernando Garrón, and Humberto Loaiza were shot near Challacollo. The rest, two senators, Luis Calvo and Félix Capriles; two former ministers of state, Carlos Salinas Aramayo and Rubén Terrazas; and a military general, Demetrio Ramos; were executed near Chuspipata. The latter executions were particularly brutal as the condemned were shot and their bodies thrown into a 3,000-foot (910 m) ravine. The government announced the executions through a note signed by Major Jorge Eguino on 21 November 1944.

Once the facts were discovered, Villarroel maintained that he had not ordered the executions. However, as head of government, he took responsibility for what happened. Some versions indicate that several crimes carried out during the Villarroel government were carried out by RADEPA, without the knowledge of the president. Whatever the case, the executions shocked the population. In 1977, writer Roberto Querejazu would claim that "if the Catavi massacre was the flag raised by the MNR and the RADEPA in their revolt against Peñaranda, the 'crimes of Challacollo and Chuspipata' became those of the PIR and the traditional parties to drag public opinion against Villarroel."

== Overthrow and death ==
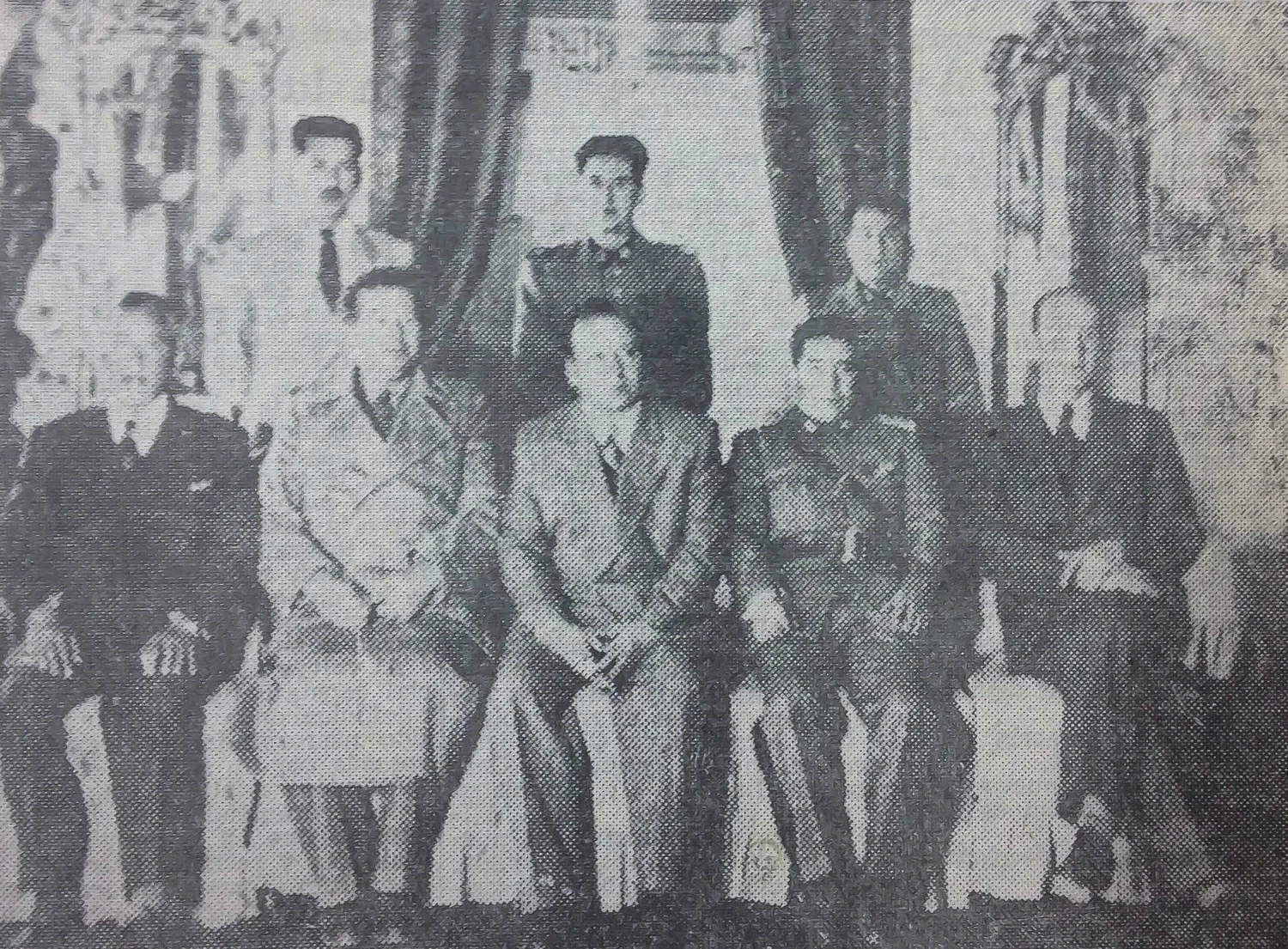
The last photo taken of Villarroel alive, presenting his new cabinet 20 July 1946

The atrocities of Chuspipata and Challacollo contributed to a gradual process of deterioration in the popularity of the government of Gualberto Villarroel, a process accelerated by the violent repression that the regime promoted against members of the opposition and citizens critical of its actions. Dissatisfaction came to a head in July 1946 as a tripartite group of workers, students, and teachers threatened to strike. Their main demand was the adjustment of teachers' wages which at the time sat at a meager $12.50 to $20 a month. Also among their demands was the removal of the MNR from government, and the resignation of the MNR and its head Víctor Paz Estenssoro, who was held responsible for the executions of Chuspipata and Challacollo, from Villarroel's cabinet. The government refused, stating that an increase in wages would cause inflation, this despite the fact that an estimated 56% of the national budget was being spent on the army alone.

On 8 July, teachers and professors of the Higher University of San Andrés (UMSA), joined two days later by university students, went on strike demanding increased wages. The police dispersed the demonstration concentrated in the Plaza Murillo with rifle and machine gun fire, leaving 3 dead and 11 wounded. On 17 July, the windows of the UMSA were found destroyed, having been stoned the night before by drunk MNR members including the minister of agriculture, Julio Zuazo Cuenca. The gesture galvanized university students who organized in La Paz, rallying the city's population to their side. During one of these rallies, Bergel Camberos, a student from the Pedro Domingo Murillo Industrial School, was shot by police, heightening the crowd's animosity against the government. In a bid to disperse the growing crowds, President Villarroel brought the Loa 4th Infantry Regiment and the Bolívar 2nd Artillery Regiment into the city. The situation quickly devolved with the army clashing with the student protesters, causing 10 casualties. On 19 July, an infantry column descended on La Paz with orders to occupy some parts of the city.

In an attempt to deescalate the situation, Villarroel met with Héctor Ormachea, the rector of the UMSA, and ordered that the students arrested in the clashes be released. That same day, Villarroel requested the resignation of Minister of Agriculture Zuazo and met with Minister of Finance Paz Estenssoro to request the removal of the MNR party from government, facilitating their asylum in foreign embassies. On 20 July, a new all-military cabinet was announced and the commitment of Defense Minister Ángel Rodríguez not to fire on the people was heard on the radio. At 7 p.m., MNR ministers presented their resignation at the government palace.

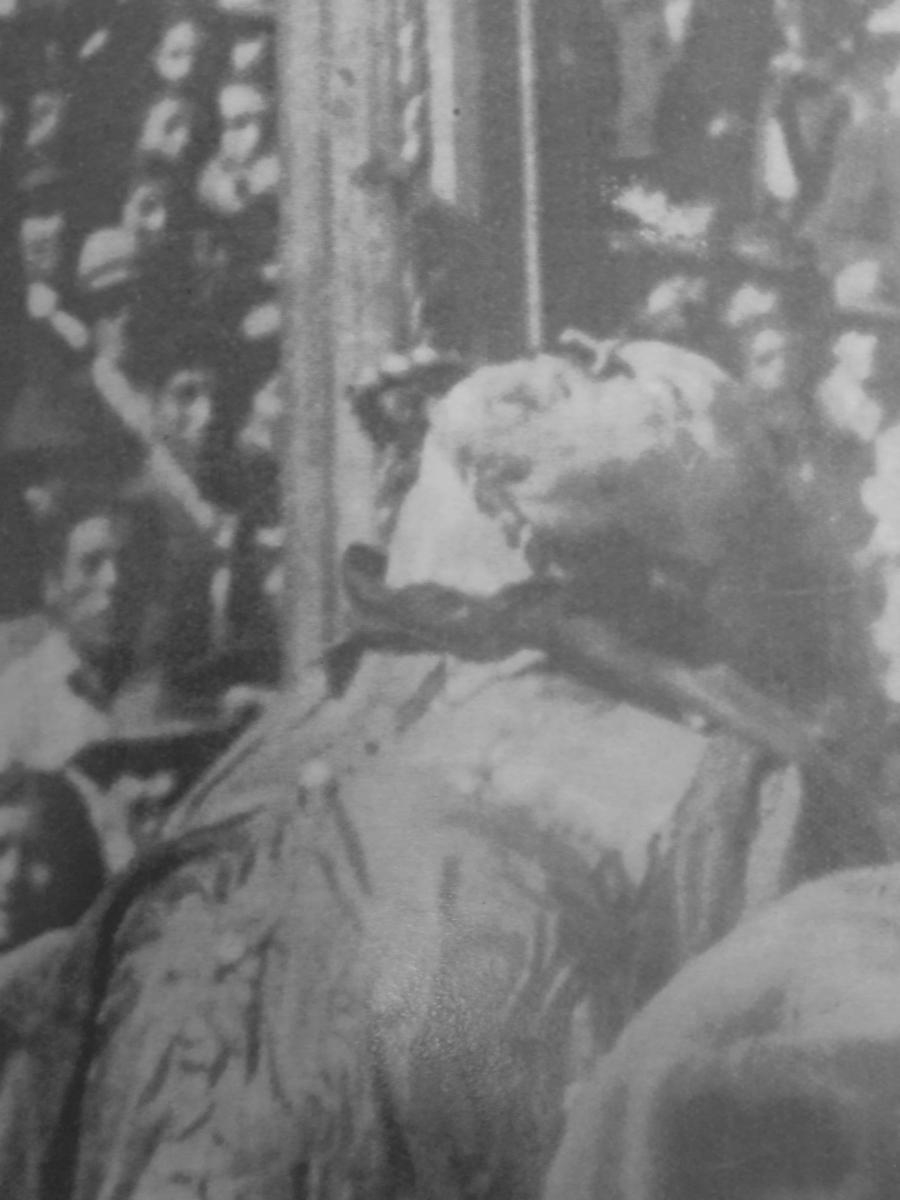
President Gualberto Villarroel is lynched and hanged in Plaza Murillo, 21 July 1946

At 11 p.m., military commanders led by Minister General Rodríguez entered the Palacio Quemado and requested the resignation of Villarroel to avoid a massacre. While some officers loyal to Villarroel implored against such a decision, it was concluded that it would be difficult to maintain the president's situation without the full support of the army, taking into account that many of the troops who were quartered had relatives who had died in previous clashes. Rodríguez would later say that "The president did not expect this coup. His bewilderment was distressing." Finally, Villarroel agreed to resign with Vice President Montellano as his successor. However, all those present rejected this because Montellano belonged to the MNR, and the people at that time did not want any hint of that party in government.

At 1:30 p.m. on 21 July, Villarroel drew up his resignation and presented it to General Damaso Arenas, commander-in-chief of the army. By that point, however, an easy end to the protests and riots through the president's resignation was no longer possible. Unaware of the president's resignation, anti-government crowds took control of the Plaza Murillo, the site of the Palacio Quemado, laying siege to it. The enraged crowds of teachers, students, and marketplace women seized arms from the arsenal. The revolt spread throughout the city. The jail was attacked and political prisoners released, while Max Toledo, Director General of Transit and member of RADEPA, was surprised and killed in the vicinity of Plaza San Pedro. His body was one of many to be hung in the square, inspired by the hanging and desecration of the corpse of Benito Mussolini the year prior. As suspected, military units eventually stopped defending the regime. Rather, soldiers of the Loa 4th Infantry Regiment joined the insurrection.

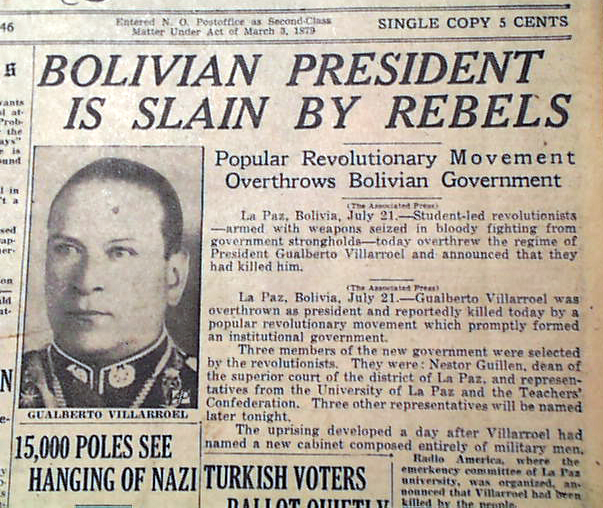
The newspaper Times-Picayune reports on the death of Villarroel, 22 July 1946

The rioters eventually stormed the Palacio Quemado itself in search of Villarroel. He was discovered in a cupboard in the Office of Administrative Reorganization and Efficiency. There are several accounts of what happened next. One claims that one of the revolutionaries fired his submachine gun through the closed cupboard door upon hearing a noise and discovered the mortally wounded body of Villarroel when he opened it. Another alleges that Villarroel opened the cupboard himself and fired his revolver at his attackers before falling riddled with gunshots. A third version says that when discovered he exclaimed: "I am not Villarroel, I am Alfredo Mendizábal, head of the PIR (one of the leaders of the revolution)."

Whatever the case, Villarroel died within the Palacio Quemado and his body was thrown through a window onto Ayacucho Street in the Plaza Murillo. Villarroel was then lynched in the street, his clothes torn and his mutilated, almost naked corpse hung on a lamp post. The same fates were found within the vicinity of the surrounding streets by Captain Waldo Ballivián, the president's secretary Luis Uría de la Oliva, and the journalist Roberto Hinojosa. Following the bloody events of 21 July, Tomás Monje, the President of the Superior District Court of the judicial district of La Paz, was appointed by the opposition to temporarily take command as part of an interim junta. As Monje was ill, Néstor Guillén, Dean of the District Court, took provisional command.

== See also ==
- Cabinet of Gualberto Villarroel
- Government Junta of Bolivia (1943–1944)

Political offices
Preceded by Enrique Peñaranda	President of Bolivia; 1943–1946	Succeeded by Néstor Guillén
