= Independent Socialist Party (Bolivia, 1944) =

Bolivian political party formed in 1944

The Independent Socialist Party (1944) (Spanish: Partido Socialista Independiente, PSI) was founded in 1944 by Enrique Baldivieso, José Tamayo, Fernando Campero Álvarez and Augusto Guzmán, former leaders of the United Socialist Party.

With the coup d'état of 1943 and the coming to power of Major Gualberto Villarroel López, the United Socialist Party split, with a dissident group forming the Independent Socialist Party, which for some time cooperated with the Villarroel regime and with Congressional majority bloc.

With the overthrow of Villarroel, on 10 November, 1946, the Independent Socialist Party joined with the Genuine Republican Party, the United Socialist Party and the Republican Socialist Party to create the Republican Socialist Unity Party.
