= Greenberg Carville Shrum =

American political campaign strategy group

Greenberg Carville Shrum (GCS) is an American political campaign strategy group.

== People ==
- Stan Greenberg (GCS Pollster), now of Greenberg Quinlan Rosner
- James Carville (GCS Strategist), political pundit, advisor to president Bill Clinton
- Bob Shrum, a political consultant
- Tad Devine (GCS Advertising Consultant)

== See also ==
- Our Brand Is Crisis (2005 film)
- Our Brand Is Crisis (2015 film)
