= Our Brand Is Crisis =

Our Brand Is Crisis may refer to:

- Our Brand Is Crisis (2005 film), American political documentary
- Our Brand Is Crisis (2015 film), American comedy-drama based on the 2005 film
