= Kosmos Energy =

American oil and gas company

Kosmos Energy Ltd.
- Type: Public
- Traded as: NYSE: KOS; LSE: KOS; Russell 2000 component
- Industry: Oil and gas
- Founded: 2003; 23 years ago
- Founders: James C. Musselman; Brian F. Maxted; W. Greg Dunlevy; Paul Dailly
- Headquarters: Dallas, Texas, U.S.
- Key people: Andy Inglis (chairman & CEO); Neal D. Shah (CFO)
- Products: Crude oil Natural gas
- Revenue: ▲US$1.33 billion (2021)
- Net income: ▲US$−78 million (2021)
- Total assets: ▲US$4.94 billion (2021)
- Total equity: ▲US$529 million (2021)
- Number of employees: 229 (December 2021)
- Website: kosmosenergy.com

Kosmos Energy is an American upstream oil company founded and based in Dallas, Texas. While previously incorporated in Bermuda, Kosmos has reincorporated in Delaware. The company holds production and development operations offshore Ghana, Equatorial Guinea, and Gulf of Mexico, while holding a development project offshore Mauritania and Senegal, and exploration licenses offshore Namibia, São Tomé and Príncipe and Suriname. It was previously involved in exploration offshore Morocco and Western Sahara. It discovered the Jubilee oil field off the coast of Ghana and the cross-border Tortue gas field offshore Mauritania and Senegal. Kosmos was the focus of a documentary Big Men that followed the company as it worked to establish the Jubilee oil field in Ghana.

== History ==
Kosmos Energy was established in 2003 by founding partners James C. Musselman, Brian F. Maxted, W. Greg Dunlevy, and Paul Dailly. Initial backing came from American private equity firms Warburg Pincus and The Blackstone Group. Originally, it was incorporated in Bermuda.

Kosmos made one of the world's largest recent oil discoveries in June 2007, off the coast of Ghana. The company discovered the Jubilee Oil Field about 60 kilometres (37 mi) offshore. The first oil from the field was produced in 2010. The company and its operations in Ghana, around the time of the Jubilee discovery and work to develop the field, was the focus of Rachel Boynton's 2013 documentary-film Big Men. The documentary was shortened and adapted into a BBC television documentary Storyville: Power, Money, Greed and Oil.

Kosmos went public under the ticker symbol KOS on the New York Stock Exchange on May 10, 2011. The initial public offering raised more than anticipated, selling 33 million shares at $18 each. It was listed on the London Stock Exchange on August 21, 2017.

Kosmos and Chevron reached a deal in June 2012, where subsidiary Chevron Global Energy Inc. received a 50% working interest in Block 45 and Block 42 in Suriname, to boost operations. In May 2016, Kosmos reached a farm-out agreement with a subsidiary of Hess Corporation, wherein Hess acquired a 33% non-operated interest in Block 42 from Kosmos and Chevron.

Kosmos began a controversial oil drilling project in the Cape Bojador area in 2014 off the coast of the disputed territory of Western Sahara. In an article from February 2015, former UN legal counsel Hans Corell stated that exploration activities by Kosmos and Glencore were in violation of the legal opinion he wrote for the UN Security Council. Kosmos responded that its operations complied with international law and were consistent with the UN opinion. Kosmos officials also told media it recognized that its work in the area must occur alongside UN-led mediation.

The company said local populations in Western Sahara would benefit from the economic development of the region. A Kosmos official told Reuters, "If we are successful, we believe responsible resource development has the potential to create significant social and economic benefits for Western Sahara and its people. We have worked in close partnership with Morocco — as the de facto administering power of the territory. They have a vital role to play in ensuring benefit sharing, among other important issues, will happen should we be successful".

In 2016, Norway's Council on Ethics recommended that the country's Government Pension Fund Global exclude Kosmos Energy and Cairn Energy Plc. from its investment portfolio due to their activities in Western Sahara. In June 2016, the Financial Times quoted Kosmos correspondence with the Council on Ethics: "We fundamentally disagree with the council's assessment of our activities offshore Western Sahara, where we have spent considerable time on the ground working with local people to understand their views of oil and gas exploration. The council's decision fails to recognize that people in Western Sahara—whom we have met in hundreds of face-to-face conversations—want the economic opportunities that come from increased foreign investment." In February 2018, Kosmos announced its withdrawal from Morocco and Western Sahara, marking the end of 17 years of companies in the oil sector there.

Kosmos made two significant gas discoveries offshore Mauritania in 2015. Kosmos discovered gas at its Tortue-1 exploration well in Block C-8 in April 2015, followed by another gas discovery in its Marsouin-1 exploration well, which was later renamed Bir Allah, in the northern part of Block C-8. A few kilometers south of Tortue-1, Kosmos Energy discovered gas at its Guembeul-1 exploration well offshore Senegal in January 2016.

The company continued to make gas discoveries in 2016 and 2017, including significant natural gas resources at the Teranga-1 exploration well offshore Senegal in 2016. In December 2016, Kosmos and BP entered a partnership in Mauritania and Senegal. BP acquired a 62% working interest, including operatorship, of Kosmos' exploration blocks in Mauritania and a 32.49% effective working interest in Kosmos' Senegal exploration blocks. In May 2017, the two companies made a major discovery off the coast of Senegal while drilling the Yakaar-1 exploration well.

Senegal and Mauritania signed a cooperation agreement to allow for Kosmos and BP to develop gas resources shared by the two counties in February 2018. BP and Kosmos made a final investment decision on the Tortue project in December 2018, leading to the first phase of the Tortue LNG development.

Kosmos Energy acquired Deep Gulf Energy, expanding Kosmos' oil and gas operations into the Gulf of Mexico, in August 2018. In December 2018, Kosmos was reincorporated in Delaware. Previously, it was incorporated in Bermuda.

== Operations ==
As of 2021, Kosmos Energy produces oil and gas in Equatorial Guinea, Ghana and the Gulf of Mexico, and has a license to explore in one block offshore São Tomé and Príncipe. In December 2016, BP entered into a partnership with Kosmos, whereby BP became the operator of Kosmos's exploration blocks in Senegal and Mauritania, which includes the Greater Tortue Ahmeyim (GTA) liquefied natural gas project. Previously it operated also in Morocco and Western Sahara but has ended its operations there.

=== Ghana ===
Kosmos Energy discovered the Jubilee Oil Field in 2007. The Jubilee field is estimated to hold up to 1 billion barrels (160 million cubic metres) of oil and 800 billion cubic feet (23 billion cubic metres) of natural gas. United States Secretary of State Hillary Clinton reportedly advocated for Kosmos and other U.S.-based oil companies in Ghana as Kosmos began development of the Jubilee field. In addition to Jubilee, Kosmos is a partner on the TEN (Tweneboa, Enyenra and Ntomme) project developing the Tweneboa, Enyenra, and Ntomme hydrocarbon accumulations. Oil first flowed from TEN in 2016, which sits approximately 30 nautical miles (60 kilometres) off the coast of Ghana.

In 2016, Kosmos owned a 24.1% stake in Jubilee and a 17% stake in TEN. Kosmos announced in late 2021 it had acquired an additional 18% interest in the Jubilee Field and an additional 11% interest in the TEN field, both from Occidental Petroleum Corporation for $550 million. The 2021 transaction was subject to a 30 day pre-emption period, which was exercised by Tullow Oil reducing Kosmos' total interest in Jubilee to 38.3% and TEN to 19.8%.

=== Equatorial Guinea ===
In October 2017, Kosmos entered a 50:50 joint venture with Trident Energy to acquire Hess Corporation's interest in the Ceiba Field and Okume Complex assets offshore Equatorial Guinea. Kosmos also has interests in exploration blocks offshore Equatorial Guinea. In November 2019, Kosmos announced an oil discovery at its S-5 well offshore of Equatorial Guinea.

=== Gulf of Mexico ===
Kosmos Energy entered the deepwater Gulf of Mexico in August 2018 when it acquired Deep Gulf Energy from First Reserve, a private equity firm, for $1.23 billion. Kosmos Energy paid $925 million in cash and $300 million in common stock to acquire DGE. As a result of the transaction, Kosmos Energy increased its daily production by more than 50% to 70,000 barrels of oil equivalent; estimated reserves increased 40% to 280 million barrels of oil equivalent.

=== Mauritania and Senegal ===
Kosmos has operated in the Cayar and St. Louis blocks offshore Senegal. At the time of operation it held a 32.51% interest in each of the two exploration licenses.

In Mauritania, Kosmos has acreage in the C8 and C12 blocks which range in depth from 100 to 3,000 meters. C8 and C12 are located on the western margin of the Mauritania Salt Basin offshore Mauritania. It made a significant gas discovery at its Tortue-1 well in Block C-8, offshore Mauritania, in April 2015. The well was drilled to test the Tortue West prospect, forming a part of the Greater Tortue complex. Its next discovery offshore came at Kosmos' Marsouin-1 exploration well, later renamed Bir Allah, in the northern part of Block C-8. With results from its Ahmeyim-2 appraisal well, Kosmos estimated the Tortue West contains 15 trillion cubic feet (420 billion cubic metres) of gas, and the Greater Tortue Complex contains more than 20 trillion cubic feet (570 billion cubic metres). Company officials said this discovery confirmed that the Tortue gas resource, which is also called Ahmeyim, straddles the maritime boundary between Senegal and Mauritania.

Kosmos and BP have a farm-out agreement over the joint gas discovery in Mauritania and Senegal, as well as future exploration. Under the deal, Kosmos focuses on exploration, while BP controls development and production operations. The two companies have discovered an estimated 15 trillion cubic feet (420 billion cubic metres) of gross Pmean gas resource at the Yakaar-1 exploration well. At the end of 2018, Kosmos Energy announced a final investment decision for phase 1 of the Greater Tortue Ahmeyim LNG Project alongside BP.

The Greater Tortue Ahmeyin (GTA) natural gas field is being developed to produce gas from a deepwater system to a midwater floating production storage and offloading (FPSO) vessel. The FPSO processes the gas for liquefaction and sends the gas via pipeline to a floating liquefied natural gas (FLNG) facility. The FLNG facility is located on the Mauritania and Senegal maritime border. As of September 2022, phase 1 of the Greater Tortue Ahmeyim project was expected to begin production in 2023 with an estimated yield of approximately 2.5 million tons annually; a final investment decision had not been reached for phase 2. The GTA project will provide global export and provide gas availability for domestic use in Mauritania and Senegal.

Kosmos Energy confirmed gas resources at the Yakaar-2 appraisal well offshore Senegal. In October 2019, Kosmos made a major gas discovery at its Orca-1 exploration well offshore Mauritania. The company estimated the total gas available as 100 trillion cubic feet. In October 2019, Kosmos made a major gas discovery at its Orca-1 exploration well offshore Mauritania. The company estimated the total gas available offshore Mauritania and Senega as 100 trillion cubic feet of gas.

=== Suriname ===
In Suriname, Kosmos operated in two exploration licensed areas. It held a 50% interest in Block 45 and a 33% interest in Block 42. In 2018, it abandoned two exploration wells, Anapai-1A in Block 45 and Pontoenoe-1 in Block 42, because the company failed to find hydrocarbons. Royal Dutch Shell acquired Kosmos Energy's offshore Suriname position in December 2020.

=== Morocco and Western Sahara ===
As operator, Kosmos held a 55% interest of the Boujdour Maritime block and 75% interest of the Essaouira block. In October 2013, Kosmos reached a farm-out deal with Cairn Energy subsidiary Capricorn Exploration & Development Company Ltd. Under the deal, Cairn took a 20% non-operated interest in Boujdour Maritime block.

The license of the Boujdour block was signed with the Moroccan state oil company ONHYM.

Kosmos announced in May 2014 it would plug and abandon its FA-1 well in the Foum Assaka Offshore block. While it did not find oil, the company said there was evidence of a working petroleum system and the well provided important seismic calibration details. These details were incorporated into the company's petroleum system analysis.

On March 2, 2015, Kosmos Energy said its CB-1 exploration well in Cap Boujdour made a small discovery. The discovery was noncommercial, and the well was plugged and abandoned in February 2018.

=== Other African countries ===
Kosmos had ownership interests in six blocks offshore Sao Tome and Principe, including two blocks where Kosmos partnered with BP. In 2018, Kosmos announced it would explore a number of blocks offshore with Royal Dutch Shell. Shell purchased five of the Kosmos blocks in 2020. As of 2022 Kosmos continues to have an interest in Block 5 in Sao Tome.

With Galp, Kosmos ordered a 3D seismic survey of a large stretch of ocean floor. According to The Wall Street Journal, the survey was "one of the biggest offshore oil exploration efforts of its kind in the region". The survey was completed on August 20, 2017.

Kosmos Energy had an offshore license in Congo-Brazzaville for the Marine XXI block, which covered more than 2,300 square km. The company signed a production sharing agreement with Congo-Brazzaville and the Société Nationale des Pétroles du Congo. Kosmos terminated the contract in February 2020.

In 2018, Kosmos Energy partnered with Royal Dutch Shell to explore blocks offshore Namibia. In September 2020, Shell entered into an agreement to farm down Kosmos' portfolio of frontier exploration assets.

== Corporate affairs ==
Kosmos Energy is headquartered in Dallas, Texas, and incorporated in Delaware. It trades on the New York and London stock exchanges under the ticker symbol KOS and, as of 2018, employed about 380 workers globally.

=== Governance ===
The company is governed by a board of directors. Its executive leadership includes chairman and CEO Andrew G. Inglis, Chief Exploration Officer Tracey Henderson, and Senior Vice President and Chief Financial Officer Thomas P. Chambers.

=== Other initiatives ===
In Dallas, Kosmos gave $450,000 to the Perot Museum of Nature and Science, creating the Kosmos Energy STEM Teacher Institute Kosmos also supports the Dallas Museum of Art. It is the presenting sponsor of the Keir Collection of Islamic Art.

In Ghana, the company established the Kosmos Innovation Center in 2016, offering entrepreneurship programs to help diversify Ghana's economy, including the agriculture industry specifically. Among the center's projects is the AgriTech Challenge, which invites young innovators to develop programs to develop commercial agriculture in Ghana. In 2017, the AgriTech Challenge attracted 400 participants. In addition, Kosmos has worked with the Safe Water Network to provide residents in Western Ghana with access to clean water.

The company has partnered with an NGO, Le Partenariat, to sponsor programs in Senegal to improve the environment. In 2018, Kosmos Innovation Center launched a start-up accelerator program in Senegal. The program supports young entrepreneurs working to improve the agriculture, livestock, fisheries sectors and Senegal's overall economy. Kosmos launched the Mauritania Innovation Challenge (MIC) in August 2018, and it is modeled after the Kosmos Innovation Center.

Kosmos donated $67,500 worth of equipment to Polytechnic College of Suriname in 2016, to be used in its undergraduate Mechanical Engineering and Infrastructure programs. In 2017, the company donated $56,600 worth of equipment for students studying mineral production at Anton de Kom University of Suriname. Kosmos has worked with international security company Safe Start to develop and deliver a safety training program for technical schools in the country. The company has also created hunger relief and entrepreneurship projects in Ghana.

Kosmos is a supporting company of the Extractive Industries Transparency Initiative (EITI). As part of the company's transparency efforts, it began publishing project payments in 2014. It also publishes contracts and petroleum agreements, and has disclosed U.S. tax payments.
