= Gonzalo Sánchez de Lozada =

President of Bolivia (1993–1997; 2002–2003)

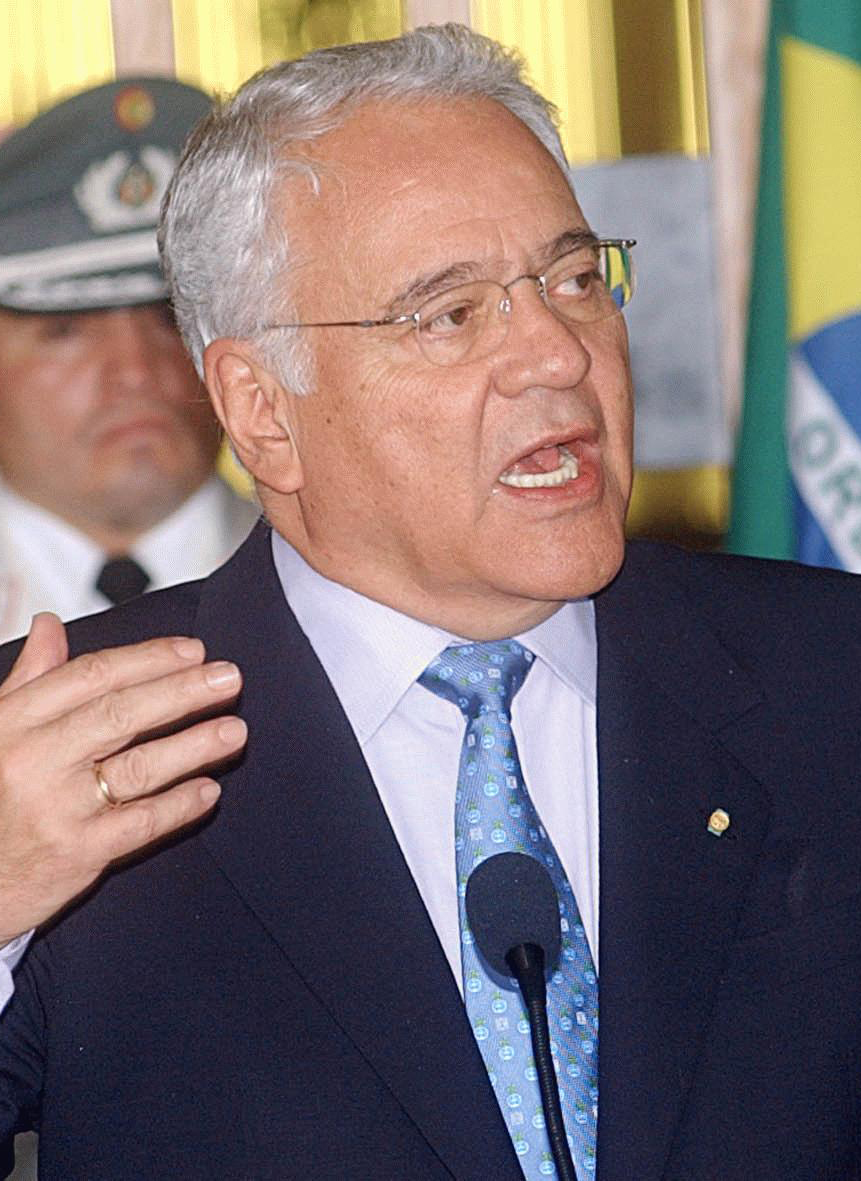
- Sánchez de Lozada in 2003

61st President of Bolivia
- In office 6 August 2002 – 17 October 2003
- Vice President: Carlos Mesa
- Preceded by: Jorge Quiroga
- Succeeded by: Carlos Mesa
- In office 6 August 1993 – 6 August 1997
- Vice President: Víctor Hugo Cárdenas
- Preceded by: Jaime Paz Zamora
- Succeeded by: Hugo Banzer

Minister of Planning and Coordination
- In office 22 January 1986 – 20 September 1988
- President: Víctor Paz Estenssoro
- Preceded by: Guillermo Bedregal Gutiérrez
- Succeeded by: Fernando Romero Moreno

Personal details
- Born: Gonzalo Daniel Sánchez de Lozada Sánchez Bustamante; 1 July 1930 (age 96) La Paz, Bolivia
- Citizenship: Bolivia; United States
- Party: Revolutionary Nationalist Movement
- Spouse: Ximena Iturralde
- Parent(s): Enrique Sánchez de Lozada; Carmen Sánchez Bustamante
- Relatives: Daniel Sánchez Bustamante (grandfather)
- Education: University of Chicago (A.B.)
- Awards: Order of the Condor of the Andes
- Website: detodos.online

Gonzalo Daniel Sánchez de Lozada Sánchez Bustamante (Note: In this Spanish name, the first or paternal surname is Sánchez de Lozada and the second or maternal family name is Sánchez Bustamante. This surname is double-barrelled, being made up of multiple names. It should be written as Sánchez de Lozada, not Sánchez.) (born 1 July 1930), known mononymously as Goni, is a Bolivian business magnate and politician who served as the 61st president of Bolivia from 1993 to 1997 and from 2002 to 2003. He was a member and leader of the Revolutionary Nationalist Movement, and previously served as minister of planning and coordination from 1986 to 1988.

Born in La Paz to a political family, Sánchez de Lozada was raised in the United States and studied philosophy at the University of Chicago. His upbringing there left him with a characteristic Midwestern accent in Spanish. He amassed a significant fortune as the founder, president, and major shareholder of the Southern Mining Company, Bolivia's leading private mining corporation. Entering politics during the democratic transition, he represented Cochabamba in the Chamber of Deputies from 1979 to 1980 and 1982 to 1985, and in the Senate from 1985 to 1989, being briefly its president in 1985.

From 1986 to 1988, Sánchez de Lozada served as minister of planning under Víctor Paz Estenssoro. He rose to prominence for implementing shock therapy to tackle Bolivia's economic crisis, reducing hyperinflation from nearly 25,000 percent to a single digit in mere weeks. His tenure helped him inherit leadership of the MNR, which Paz Estenssoro had led since its founding. Sánchez de Lozada realigned the party toward neoliberalism and incorporated the middle and upper classes into its base, shifting it away from its peasant roots; Gonism – distinct from movimientismo – emerged as its main ideology.

He ran for president in the 1989 election and won a plurality but lost the congressional vote to Jaime Paz Zamora. In 1993, he was elected president, driven by an ambitious reform agenda. In office, Sánchez de Lozada led one of the most significant administrations since the National Revolution. He enacted landmark legislation to devolve power to local governments, reform education, and attract foreign capital. More controversially, he partially privatized Bolivia's major state-owned enterprises, transferring them to foreign investors. Far less popular, he clinched a second nonconsecutive term in 2002. By 2003, Sánchez de Lozada's government was paralyzed by protests during the Bolivian gas conflict. His crackdown on demonstrators resulted in the Black October massacre and led to his resignation and flight abroad.

Historical assessments regard Sánchez de Lozada as the most emblematic and significant figure of Bolivia's neoliberal period, spanning from 1985 to 2005. His legacy is mired in controversy related to the events of his second term, and he is associated with a political and economic model that has since faced widespread criticism. Since leaving office, Sánchez de Lozada has faced multiple criminal cases in Bolivia and was held liable in the US for extrajudicial killings under the Alien Tort Statute.

== Political life ==
Sánchez de Lozada's ancestors include Daniel Sánchez Bustamante, grandfather and Minister of Foreign Affairs; Mariano Calvo, great-great-grandfather and President; and Tomás Frías, great-great-grandmother's brother and also President.

The son of a political exile, university professor, and diplomat, Sánchez de Lozada spent his early years in the United States. He grew up in Iowa, and he attended boarding school at Scattergood Friends School in rural Iowa. He studied literature and philosophy at the University of Chicago. As a result of this experience, he speaks Spanish with a midwestern American accent.

At the age of 21, he returned to Bolivia in 1951, on the eve of the 1952 revolution led by the MNR political party. This transformed Bolivia from a semi-feudal oligarchy to a multi-party democracy by introducing universal suffrage, nationalizing the mines of the three Tin Barons, and carrying out sweeping agrarian reform. Sánchez de Lozada pursued filmmaking and participated in several cinematic projects in the 1950s, including filming Bolivia's 1952 Revolution. In 1954, he founded Telecine. His film Voces de la Tierra (Voices from the Earth) won First Prize for documentaries at the 1957 Edinburgh Film Festival.

In 1957, Sánchez de Lozada turned to resource businesses, founding Andean Geoservices. In 1966, he founded the mining company COMSUR, later becoming one of the most successful mining entrepreneurs in the country.

Bolivia was ruled for nearly two decades by military dictatorships. In 1979 and again in 1980, on the return to democracy, Sánchez de Lozada was elected to congress as deputy for Cochabamba. In 1985, he was elected senator from Cochabamba and then as President of the Senate of Bolivia. Soon after, President Víctor Paz Estenssoro appointed him as Planning Minister. Sánchez de Lozada oversaw a series of economic structural reforms that steered the country away from state capitalism, towards a mixed economy. He is particularly known for having sharply reduced the hyperinflation of the period, using economic shock therapy along with then Finance Minister Juan L. Cariaga Osorio, as championed by United States economist Jeffrey Sachs, then of Harvard University.

Sánchez de Lozada ran for president in 1989 as the MNR candidate. While he won the plurality with 25.6% of the popular vote, in the congressional runoff among the top three candidates, Jaime Paz Zamora of the MIR, who had polled 21.8% of the popular vote and formerly been in third place, won the presidency. Paz Zamora was backed in the runoff by the second-placed, former military dictator Hugo Banzer of the ADN, who had won 25.2% of the popular vote. Sánchez de Lozada describes himself as a fiscal conservative and social progressive.

== First presidency (1993–1997) ==
In 1993, Sánchez de Lozada again ran for president, this time in alliance with the Tupac Katari Revolutionary Liberation Movement (Movimiento Revolucionario Tupac Katari de Liberación, MRTKL), an indigenous party formed in 1985 whose leader Víctor Hugo Cárdenas was the candidate for vice-president. The MNR-MRTKL ticket won the first plurality with 36.5% of the popular vote, and Sánchez de Lozada was confirmed as president by Congress. A coalition government that included the center-left Free Bolivia Movement (MBL) and populist Civic Solidarity Union (UCS) was formed. With the 1993 electoral victory, Cárdenas became the first elected indigenous vice president in South America.

The 1993–1997 MNR-led government initiated a series of constitutional, social, economic and political reforms. The Constitution was rewritten to define Bolivia as a multi-ethnic and multi-cultural nation; the first articles enshrined indigenous rights. Other legislation included the Popular Participation Act, which decentralized the country by creating 311 (since expanded to 321) municipal governments, empowering them for local governance. The law introduced direct municipal elections for the indigenous population, and authorized local decision making on municipal spending, for which 20 percent of federal spending was guaranteed to the municipalities on a per capita basis. Other programs included educational reform, which introduced classroom teaching in the local indigenous languages, universal maternity coverage and milk and medical coverage for children up to the age of five years, and a universal old-age annual benefit. Political reforms included opening elections to independent candidates for congressional seats; and capitalization, a program which enabled the formation of joint ventures by private capital and the Bolivian people (not the Bolivian state), and requiring the private capital be invested directly in the new company.

=== Capitalization program ===
The capitalization program aimed to sell public enterprises to private companies in exchange for money. The program was meant to occur in four phases, which would include the privatization of electricity and hydrocarbon. Between 1995-1996, the five largest state enterprises were privatized: the national oil company, phone company, electric company, national airline, and train system. By 1996, the program included the privatization of water. The capitalization program was controversial: it was perceived as a privatization of five major state-owned companies that ceded management of these industries to foreign interests. Supporters believed that the requirement for private capital to be directly invested in the new joint ventures significantly reduced room for corruption. The program was intended to provide for development of these "strategic" resources, as the Bolivian government could not afford to do so. The revenues of the new companies were expected to yield funds for human and social, as well as infrastructure development. The dividend payouts for the Bolivian people were the foundation of a universal, annual old-age benefit, the BONOSOL. Although small on a per capita basis, it was expected to benefit primarily the rural elderly, the most marginalized sector of Bolivia's indigenous population.

Finally, the reforms also included changes to the country's electoral laws. A new electoral system was introduced. The change opened elections for 70 congressional seats to independent candidates who were elected by plurality, with the remaining 60 seats to be filled proportionally by members of parties reflecting the votes cast for the presidential tickets. If no presidential candidate won an absolute majority, the president would be elected in a run-off of the top two contenders. The presidential term of office was set at five years.

Critics of the program have cited loss of national funds, skyrocketing prices for locals, and social unrest associated with such changes. The sale of the national oil company resulted in millions of dollars in lost profits, compared to the price of the sale. The privatization of electricity resulted in price increases for electricity, as well. As written by Jim Shultz for the North American Congress on Latin America, "The great sums promised from these sales of public assets seemed to barely trickle down into the pockets of the poor and flow freely into the coffers of the wealthy Bolivians who cut the deals—with major corruption scandals a regular fixture." Perhaps the most controversial impact was the privatization of water, which began under the government of Sánchez de Lozada and was followed by President Hugo Banzer, resulting in the Cochabamba Water War.

== Second presidency (2002–2003) ==
In 2002, Sánchez de Lozada again ran for president. He chose Carlos Mesa as his running mate, an independent historian and journalist who had MNR sympathies. Sánchez de Lozada hired U.S. political consultants James Carville, Tad Devine, Stan Greenberg and Bob Shrum to advise his campaign.

After running a sophisticated campaign, Sánchez de Lozada seemed positioned to win a strong enough plurality to form a strong government. However, three days before the elections, the U.S. ambassador publicly warned the Bolivian people against electing "those who want Bolivia to again be an exporter of cocaine," as it would threaten U.S. aid to Bolivia. The people reacted in resentment, swelling the anti-U.S. vote for Evo Morales in the last three days of the campaign by 9 percent and helping him finish second after Sánchez de Lozada. Evo Morales of the Movement Toward Socialism (MAS) received 20.94% of the popular vote. The center-right neo-populist candidate, Manfred Reyes of NFR placed a close third with 20.91% of the popular vote. After a difficult coalition-building process, Sánchez de Lozada was elected in a coalition formed by the MNR-MBL, MIR and UCS, the last two former members of the preceding coalition headed by the rightist, former dictator General Hugo Banzer.

When Sánchez de Lozada took office, he was faced with an economic and social crisis inherited from the preceding administration. Economic growth had plunged from the 4.8% at the end of Sánchez de Lozada's first presidency to 0.6% in 1999 and had recovered to only 2% for 2002. The fiscal deficit was running at 8%.

=== Gas War and resignation ===
From his inauguration in August 2002 until the end of the year, there were fewer public tensions. In January 2003 and under the leadership of Evo Morales, a group of union leaders (Evo Morales for the "cocaleros"—coca growers, Jaime Solares and Roberto de la Cruz for urban workers and miners, Felipe Quispe for the indigenous farmers in the Aymara region surrounding La Paz) joined together to found the "People's High Command" (Estado Mayor del pueblo). A new wave of heightened protests began; main roads were blocked, and towns and cities were brought to a standstill. Some groups aired long-standing grievances against the government; others were targeted entirely locally, protesting against decisions of the now self-governing municipalities. In February, a standoff between police demanding higher pay and army units called to protect the presidential palace suddenly ended in violence and deaths in the streets of La Paz, without articulated demands.

The acute economic crisis affected above all the urban workers and the farming/indigenous populations; their struggles gave widespread support for protests. Protests and demands became more focused: the cocaleros continued protesting against eradication of a millenary plant (coca) used to produce cocaine, although Banzer's "Coca 0" policy had been replaced by the earlier subsidized crop substitution policy, in order to achieve gradual coca reduction but not total eradication. The indigenous farmers of the La Paz Aymara region pressed for political reform, to include recognition and inclusion of Bolivia's indigenous ethnic groups as legitimate political blocs. They wanted economic de-centralization based on recognition of indigenous groups as legitimate political actors. Other demands included autonomy for their territories. By contrast, urban workers, primarily in La Paz, and miners protested against the possible proceeds of increasing natural gas production going to foreigners.

Demands rose for the government to return to the corporatist state and nationalize Bolivia's hydrocarbon resources. Protesters demanded Sánchez de Lozada's resignation. In late September, a convoy of buses and trucks under a police escort was bringing back to La Paz over 700 persons, including foreign tourists, after a 10-day blockade of a valley resort town. In Warisata, confrontations between protesters blocking the road and the army led to six dead, among them two soldiers and a child aged 8, shot in her own house.

A few days later, in early October, The Pacific LNG, British Petroleum and Repsol YPF had forecast an investment of three billion dollars in Chilean territory, the sale price of the gas was less than a dollar per thousand BTU and the approximate profits were one billion dollars of which the Bolivian state only received 18%, totaling 180 million dollars per year.

A few days later, in early October, it was reported that Sánchez de Lozada had decided to export Bolivia's gas to Mexico and the United States through a Chilean port. Rancor continues to be high against Chile since Bolivia lost its coastal territory to them in the late-19th-century war of the Pacific. Protesters blockaded the main highway from the city of El Alto, Bolivia down to neighboring La Paz. A massive demonstration and virtual siege of La Paz ensued.

After three days, fuel and other essential supplies were dangerously low in La Paz. On 11 October, President Sánchez de Lozada promulgated Supreme Decree 27209, ordering the militarization of the gas plants and the transport of hydrocarbons. This decree was intended to protect private and public property, noting in the third article: "whatever harm to property or persons that might be produced as an effect of fulfilling the objective of this supreme decree shall be compensated and guaranteed by the State". As a result, fully armed military troops were sent as a security force to open the way for diesel and gasoline cisterns to be transported through densely populated poor neighborhoods into La Paz.

Protesters tried to block the convoys at several points along their route. Alteño residents reported that government troops started shooting indiscriminately, killing a five-year-old child and a pregnant mother. Sánchez de Lozada and some government ministers attributed the violence to an armed 'coup', but Evo Morales and some civil groups described it as a 'massacre' by government forces.

Vice-President Mesa publicly broke with Sánchez de Lozada, saying, "Neither as a citizen nor as a man of principles can I accept that, faced with popular pressure, the response should be death." The Minister for Economic Development also resigned. 20,000 Bolivians began to march on La Paz, demanding the President's resignation. Evo Morales' supporters from Cochabamba tried to march into Santa Cruz, the largest city of the eastern lowlands where support still remained for the president. They were turned back. While blaming the violence on 'narco-syndicalist', Sánchez de Lozada proposed a National Dialogue. He promised to put export plans to a national referendum, but demands for his resignation continued to rise. According to official figures, a total of 65 civilian deaths resulted from the Gas War, with around 400 persons wounded.

Faced with rising anger at the deaths, and with coalition partner Manfred Reyes Villa withdrawing political support, Sánchez de Lozada offered his resignation on 17 October in a letter to be read at an emergency session of Congress. He left on a commercially scheduled flight for the United States.

== Exile (2003–present) ==
=== Trial of responsibility ===
In 2004, after a concerted campaign by the families of the victims, the government and human rights groups, who gathered over 700,000 signatures on petitions, two-thirds of Bolivia's Congress voted to authorize a "Trial of Responsibility" of the exiled president. It was intended to determine whether Sánchez de Lozada and his cabinet ministers should be held legally responsible for the violence of the Gas War. Supporters included many from the president's party, reflecting a broad consensus for an impartial investigation to understand the responsibilities for the violence and deaths.

The Attorney-General's office took testimony from twelve ministers, and carried out detailed preliminary investigations. Their work included forensic studies, crime scene investigations, and eyewitness testimony. Evo Morales, one of the key protest leaders, voluntarily offered evidence. In August 2011 the Bolivian Supreme Court sentenced five members of the military and two politicians to between three and fifteen years in prison for their role in the events of September and October 2003.

=== Attempts at extradition ===
The governments of Evo Morales and Luis Arce unsuccessfully sought his extradition from the U.S. to stand trial for the events of 2003. On 11 November 2008, Bolivia formally served the U.S. government with a request to extradite Sánchez de Lozada to Bolivia. The request was rejected by the U.S. State Department in 2012, based on the argument that Sánchez de Lozada's actions are not a crime in the U.S., and that no dual criminality condition existed. It said that no U.S. President could be charged for crimes done by military and police forces.

=== Civil trial in the United States ===
On 10 November 2009, the U.S. District Court in the Southern District of Florida ruled that the claims for charges of crimes against humanity against Sánchez de Lozada had no case. The court ruled that charges of extrajudicial killings could be pursued in order to allow two related U.S. cases to progress against former president Gonzalo Daniel Sánchez de Lozada de Bustamante and former Bolivian Defense Minister Jose Carlos Sánchez Berzaín.

Eight families of Bolivians killed during the 2003 protests are plaintiffs in the case. They include Etelvina Ramos Mamani and Eloy Ramos Mamani, the parents of eight-year-old Marlene, who was killed by a gunshot through her window during the military action on Warisata on 25 September 2003.

The plaintiffs in the cases, Mamani, et al. v. Sánchez de Lozada, and Mamani, et al. v. Sánchez Berzaín, seek compensatory and punitive damages under the Alien Tort Statute (ATS). On 20 May 2014, Judge James Cohn ordered that Plaintiffs' claims under the Torture Victim Protection Act (TVPA) could proceed because they sufficiently alleged facts that "plausibly suggest that these killings were deliberate," and because they adequately alleged that Defendants were responsible for the killings. The case was stayed on 19 August 2014 pending defendants' appeal of the district court's decision. Appellants-defendants filed their brief to the Eleventh Circuit Court of Appeals on 14 January 2015. Plaintiffs-appellees filed their brief on 6 March 2015. The 11th Circuit Court of Appeals issued their decision on 17 June 2016. On 17 April 2017, the US Supreme Court denied certiorari for the plaintiff's appeal, clearing the way for the case to be tried.

The jury trial for the combined cases against Sánchez de Lozada and Sánchez Berzaín began on 5 March 2018 in Fort Lauderdale, Florida. They were both found liable for the civilian deaths by the jury on 3 April 2018 under the TVPA claim that the deaths were extrajudicial killings. The plaintiffs were awarded $10 million in damages. On 30 May 2018, federal judge overturned the verdict of a jury by determining that a reasonable jury could not find them liable as a matter of law.

Lawyers for the plaintiffs appealed the judge's decision, making oral arguments before the 11th Circuit Court of Appeals in Miami in November 2019. On 3 August 2020, a three judge panel vacated the District Court's move to set aside the verdict, and ordered it to reconsider the matter on a new standard. It also ruled that plaintiffs were entitled to a new trial on the question of wrongful death, a matter the jury had decided in favor of the defendants. On 5 April 2021, the 2018 jury verdict, and the ordered $10 million payment, was reaffirmed by U.S. District Judge James I. Cohn after defense notions to dismiss the ruling were denied.

== See also ==
- Sánchez de Lozada is a member of Club of Madrid.
- Sánchez de Lozada reforms.
- Our Brand Is Crisis (2005), a documentary about Sánchez de Lozada's second presidential campaign and influence of American political consultants

Political offices
Preceded by Guillermo Bedregal Gutiérrez	Minister of Planning and Coordination; 1986–1988	Succeeded by Fernando Romero Moreno
Preceded by Jaime Paz Zamora	President of Bolivia; 1993–1997	Succeeded by Hugo Banzer
Preceded by Jorge Quiroga	President of Bolivia; 2002–2003	Succeeded by Carlos Mesa
Party political offices
Preceded by Víctor Paz Estenssoro	Revolutionary Nationalist Movement nominee for President of Bolivia; 1989, 1993	Succeeded by Juan Carlos Durán
Preceded by Juan Carlos Durán	Revolutionary Nationalist Movement nominee for President of Bolivia; 2002	Succeeded by Michiaki Nagatani Morishita
