= Tad Devine =

American political consultant, attorney

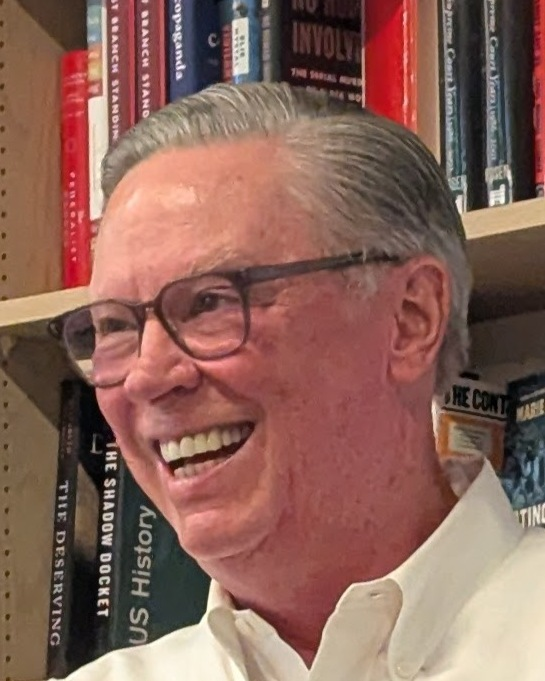
- Devine in 2026
- Born: Thomas A. Devine; June 11, 1955 (age 71); Providence, Rhode Island, U.S.
- Education: Brown University (BA); Suffolk University (JD)
- Political party: Democratic
- Spouse: Ellen Devine
- Website: Official website

Thomas A. "Tad" Devine (born June 11, 1955) is an American political consultant. Devine was a senior adviser in Al Gore's 2000 and John Kerry's 2004 Presidential campaigns. He was also the chief strategist for Bernie Sanders' 2016 presidential campaign. He has worked on campaigns for president and Prime Minister in Europe, Latin America, and the Middle East, as well as several U.S. Senate races. Devine is the president of Washington, D.C.–based media consulting firm Devine Mulvey Longabaugh.

== Early life and education ==
Devine was born June 11, 1955, in Providence, Rhode Island. He grew up in South Providence and was raised as a Catholic. After attending La Salle Academy, he received a B.A. in American history from Brown University and a J.D. from the Suffolk University Law School. He is a member of the bar in Rhode Island and the District of Columbia.

== Early career ==
From 1982 to 1983, Devine served as a law clerk to the Rhode Island Superior Court, and, from 1985 to 1987, he worked as an associate attorney in the Washington, D.C., office of the law firm Winston & Strawn. From 1989 to 1990, he served as a chief of staff to Providence, Rhode Island, mayor Joseph R. Paolino Jr.

== Political work ==
=== Democratic Party rules and delegate selection ===
Devine is considered one of the leading experts on the Democratic Party's presidential nominating process and general election strategy. In 1980, he worked on President Jimmy Carter's reelection campaign as a delegate tracker. He went on to serve as deputy director of Delegate Selection in the nomination campaign of former Vice President Walter Mondale and executive assistant to the campaign manager in the 1984 general election.

=== Michael Dukakis campaign ===
From 1987 to 1988, he served as Director of Delegate Selection and Field Operations in the nomination campaign of Massachusetts Governor Michael Dukakis. As lead negotiator for the Dukakis campaign at the 1988 Rules Committee, Devine was involved in the Democratic Party's 1988 reform that eliminated winner-takes-all methods of delegate selection and established proportional representation as the exclusive system of delegate allocation in the party. In 1992, Devine served as a member of the Democratic Party Rules Committee and was a consultant to CBS News throughout the Democratic National Convention in New York.

=== Campaign management ===
In the general election of 1988, Devine got his start managing national campaigns when he served as campaign manager for the vice presidential nominee, Texas Senator Lloyd Bentsen. In 1992, Devine served as campaign manager in Nebraska Senator Bob Kerrey's bid for the presidency.

==== Al Gore's presidential campaign ====
In the 2000 general election, Devine served as a senior strategist to the Gore/Lieberman campaign and oversaw the day-to-day management of the campaign. Devine was recruited by Carter Eskew to join the campaign part-time in August 1999. In the fall of 1999 and early months of 2000, he was sent occasionally to Gore's campaign headquarters in Nashville as a trouble shooter when Gore was looking for an AFL–CIO endorsement and during the Iowa caucuses and the New Hampshire primary. In the late spring and early summer of 2000, Devine shifted into a more central role in the campaign. He was seen as a fierce campaigner and a mediator between some of the factions in the Gore campaign. Upon his elevation, Devine helped put Democrats, who were nervous about Gore's success in the primary election against Bill Bradley, at ease. Devine, unlike other Gore advisers, suggested taking on Bradley by questioning his credentials as a Democrat. He also used his extensive knowledge of the Democratic party rules to help ensure Gore's victory in the primary by lobbying members of the Democratic National Committee's Rules and Bylaws Committee to disallow any primaries in the five weeks between New Hampshire and Super Tuesday. His aim was to minimize Bradley's political momentum should he win the New Hampshire primary and maximize the effect a New Hampshire loss would have. Devine was also willing to put himself in the role of the contrarian, occasionally questioning Gore's recommendations and telling him when his opinion differed.

==== John Kerry's presidential campaign ====
In 2003 and 2004, Devine served as a senior adviser and strategist to Senator John Kerry's campaign for president in both the primary and the general election. His elevation to a senior strategic role coincided with Senator Kerry's turn around in late 2003, and Devine remained in a senior role throughout the remainder of the campaign. He frequently represented the campaign on national television programs such as Meet the Press, C-SPAN, Face the Nation and other broadcasts.

==== Bernie Sanders' presidential campaign ====
Devine worked as chief campaign strategist for the Democratic primary campaign of Vermont Senator Bernie Sanders from 2015 until its suspension in 2016.

==== Andrew Yang's presidential campaign ====
In 2019, Devine began working for the Democratic primary campaign of entrepreneur Andrew Yang until its suspension in 2020.

=== Political media consulting ===
Since early 1993, Devine has worked as a media consultant, writing, directing and producing television and radio advertising for Democratic candidates in the U.S. and providing strategic advice for national campaigns in Europe, the Middle East and South America. Devine has worked on the campaigns of New Jersey Governor Jon Corzine in 2005, and several campaigns of Senators, including Sheldon Whitehouse (Rhode Island), Bill Nelson (Florida), Bernie Sanders (Vermont), John Kerry (Massachusetts) and the Democratic Senatorial Campaign Committee independent expenditure for the Senate races of Claire McCaskill (Missouri) and Bob Menendez (New Jersey), as well as numerous statewide elections. Devine has produced television advertising for Senator Edward Kennedy (Massachusetts), Senator John Edwards (North Carolina), and Governor Parris Glendening (Maryland).

Internationally, Devine has worked as a strategist and media consultant for the campaigns of Colombian President Andrés Pastrana Arango in 1998, Israeli Prime Minister Ehud Barak in 1999, Peruvian President Alejandro Toledo in 2001, Bolivian President Gonzalo Sanchez de Lozada in 2002, Irish Taoiseach Bertie Ahern in 1997, 2002 and 2007, Honduran President Mel Zelaya in 2005, and Ukrainian Prime Minister Viktor Yanukovych and the Party of Regions in 2006. Working closely with former Trump campaign manager, Paul Manafort (now a subject of the Mueller investigation of Trump's alleged coordination with Russia during his 2016 presidential campaign), Devine worked again with Yanukovych in 2009 and 2010 for his successful Presidential bid. Devine, as a close associate of Rick Gates and Manafort, wrote the text to Yanukovych's victory speech. He served as a strategist and media consultant for Ashraf Ghani's 2009 presidential campaign in Afghanistan.

In 2007, Devine and Julian Mulvey formed Devine Mulvey, a US and international political consulting firm. The firm's work received awards for best Internet ad in 2008 and best statewide ad in 2009. Devine Mulvey has also received Reed Awards from Campaigns and Elections magazine and Pollie awards from the American Association of Political Consultants.

In 2013, Mark Longabaugh joined the firm to form Devine Mulvey Longabaugh.

=== 2018 Paul Manafort trial and work for Ukrainian President Viktor Yanukovych ===
On August 31, 2018, Devine was the first witness for the prosecution at the federal trial of Paul Manafort in United States of America v. Paul J. Manafort, Jr.

At trial, Devine was questioned by prosecutors about his work with Manafort as a media consultant for the 2010 presidential campaign of Ukrainian President Viktor Yanukovych.

Devine reportedly stopped working for Yanukovych after his government's arrest of Yulia Tymoshenko in 2011. However, in 2014, he entertained an offer to assist a Manafort-led effort to establish a new political party in Ukraine following Yanukovych's ouster and expatriation to Russia in the aftermath of the Euromaidan Revolution.

== Academic career ==
From 1991 to 1993, Devine served as assistant to the president of Boston University. In addition to his duties, Devine taught a course on presidential campaigns in the Department of Political Science and was a frequent university lecturer. He has also taught campaign management and strategy courses at the Graduate School of Political Management at The George Washington University. Devine wrote the chapter on "Paid Media – In an Era of Revolutionary Change" in the 2008 book Campaigns on the Cutting Edge and on how Barack Obama won the 2008 Democratic presidential nomination in the 2009 book Campaigning for President . He has lectured at Harvard Kennedy School and is a regular lecturer at the American University's Washington Internship Program and for the "Politics and Journalism Semester" program at the Washington Center for Politics & Journalism. He has participated in public fora, such as 2009's Bipartisan Policy Center's Inaugural Political Summit at Tulane University, entitled "Taking the Poison Out of Partisanship.".

In 2011, Devine was a Fellow at Harvard Kennedy School. He led a study group at the Institute of Politics on American political consultants who work in foreign campaigns. While at the Kennedy School, Devine published an article in the Harvard International Review on restoring American political exceptionalism in the wake of the Bush presidency.

In 2013, Devine taught a course at New York University in Washington, D.C., on media and strategy in domestic and international campaigns. In The fall of 2013, he taught a course on media and strategy at the University of Pennsylvania Washington Semester Program in Washington, D.C.

== Media appearances ==
Devine has appeared on television programs including Andrea Mitchell Reports, Meet the Press, Face the Nation, as well as the BBC and other foreign media outlets. Devine was a guest on the Colbert Report twice, first on February 6, 2008, and later on May 29, 2008, to discuss superdelegates. Devine appeared in the 2005 Rachel Boynton documentary Our Brand Is Crisis, which follows American political consultants including James Carville, Stan Greenberg, Jeremy Rosner, and Devine during the 2002 Bolivian presidential campaign. He was a guest in a segment of The Daily Show on April 17, 2012 and in November 2012.
