= Our Brand Is Crisis (2005 film) =

- Directed by: Rachel Boynton
- Written by: Rachel Boynton
- Produced by: Rachel Boynton; Sanders Goodstein; Robert Kravis; Steven Shainberg
- Music by: Marcelo Zarvos
- Distributed by: Koch-Lorber Films
- Release date: March 12, 2005 (World Film Festival)
- Running time: 85 minutes
- Country: United States
- Languages: Spanish; English

Our Brand Is Crisis is a 2005 American documentary film by Rachel Boynton on American political campaign marketing tactics by Greenberg Carville Shrum (GCS) in the 2002 Bolivian presidential election. The election saw Gonzalo Sánchez de Lozada elected President of Bolivia, ahead of Evo Morales.

The film is distributed by Koch-Lorber Films.

"This film is a cautionary tale which comes at a very timely moment," said Koch-Lorber Films president Richard Lorber in a statement to indieWIRE. "The parallels to the current U.S. administration's approach to selling the war in Iraq are staggering."

== Cast ==
- Mauricio Balcazar (Goni's Press Advisor)
- James Carville (GCS Strategist)
- Tad Devine (GCS Advertising Consultant)
- Mark Feierstein (GCS Pollster)
- Stan Greenberg (GCS Pollster)
- Carlos Mesa (VP Candidate)
- Evo Morales (Opposing Candidate)
- Jeremy Rosner (GCS Pollster)
- Gonzalo Sánchez de Lozada (aka "Goni"; Bolivia's Presidential Candidate)
- Robert Shrum
- Tal Silberstein (GCS Management Consultant)
- Manfred Reyes Villa (Opposing Candidate)
- Amy Webber (GCS Associate)

== Awards ==
- The film won the Charles E. Guggenheim Emerging Artist Award at the 2005 Full Frame Documentary Film Festival;
- Boynton was nominated for the Truer Than Fiction Award at the Independent Spirit Awards;
- The film shared the International Documentary Association's top prize for Best Feature Documentary in 2005.
- Official Selection at the 2005 South by Southwest Festival
- Official Selection at the 2005 Edinburgh International Film Festival

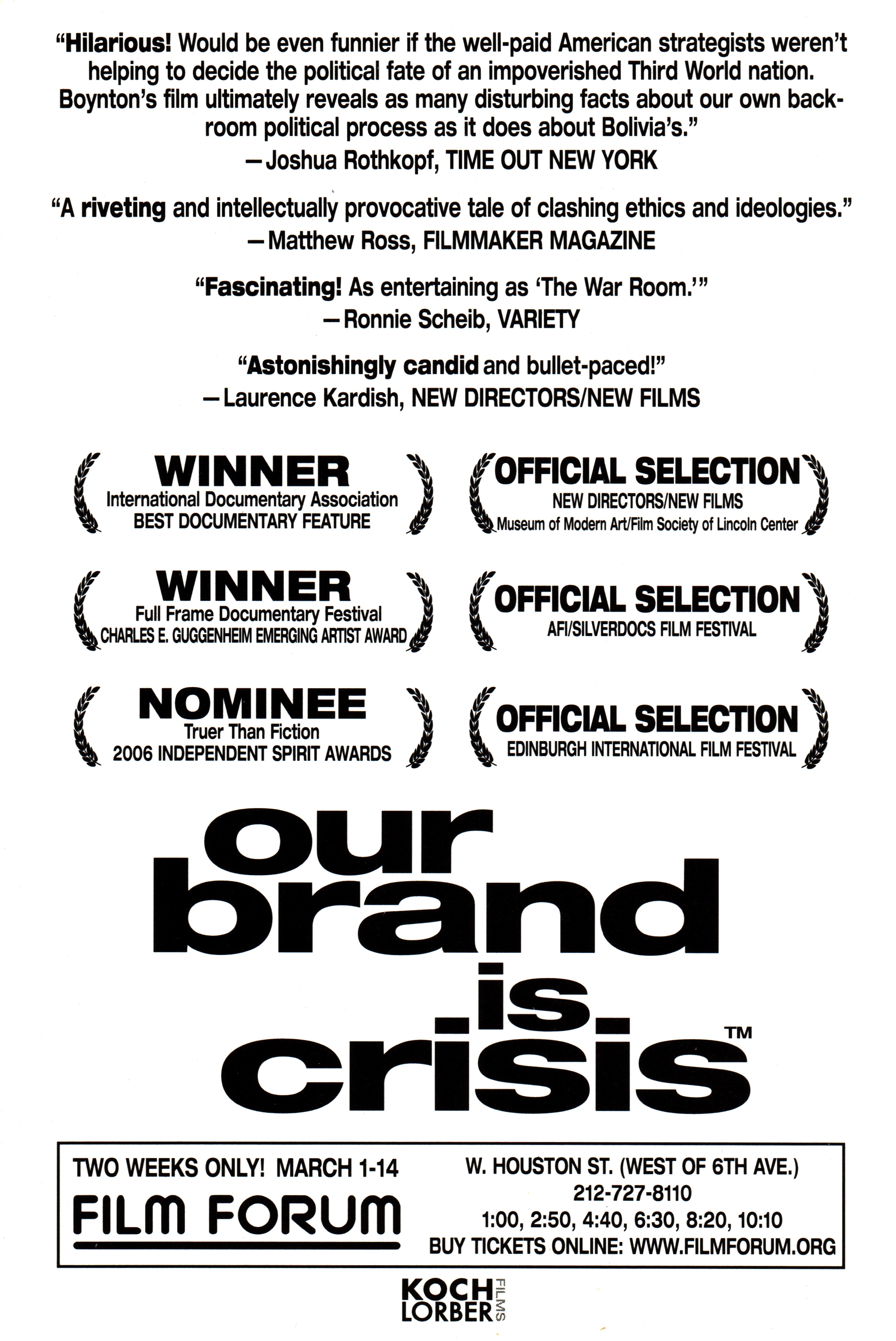
Poster from the March 1–14, 2005 showing at the Film Forum in New York City

== Reception ==
The film has a 92% approval rating with a score of 7.29/10 on Rotten tomatoes.

== Remake ==
Actor George Clooney produced a 2015 fictionalization of Our Brand Is Crisis, starring Sandra Bullock.
