= James Carville =

American political consultant (born 1944)

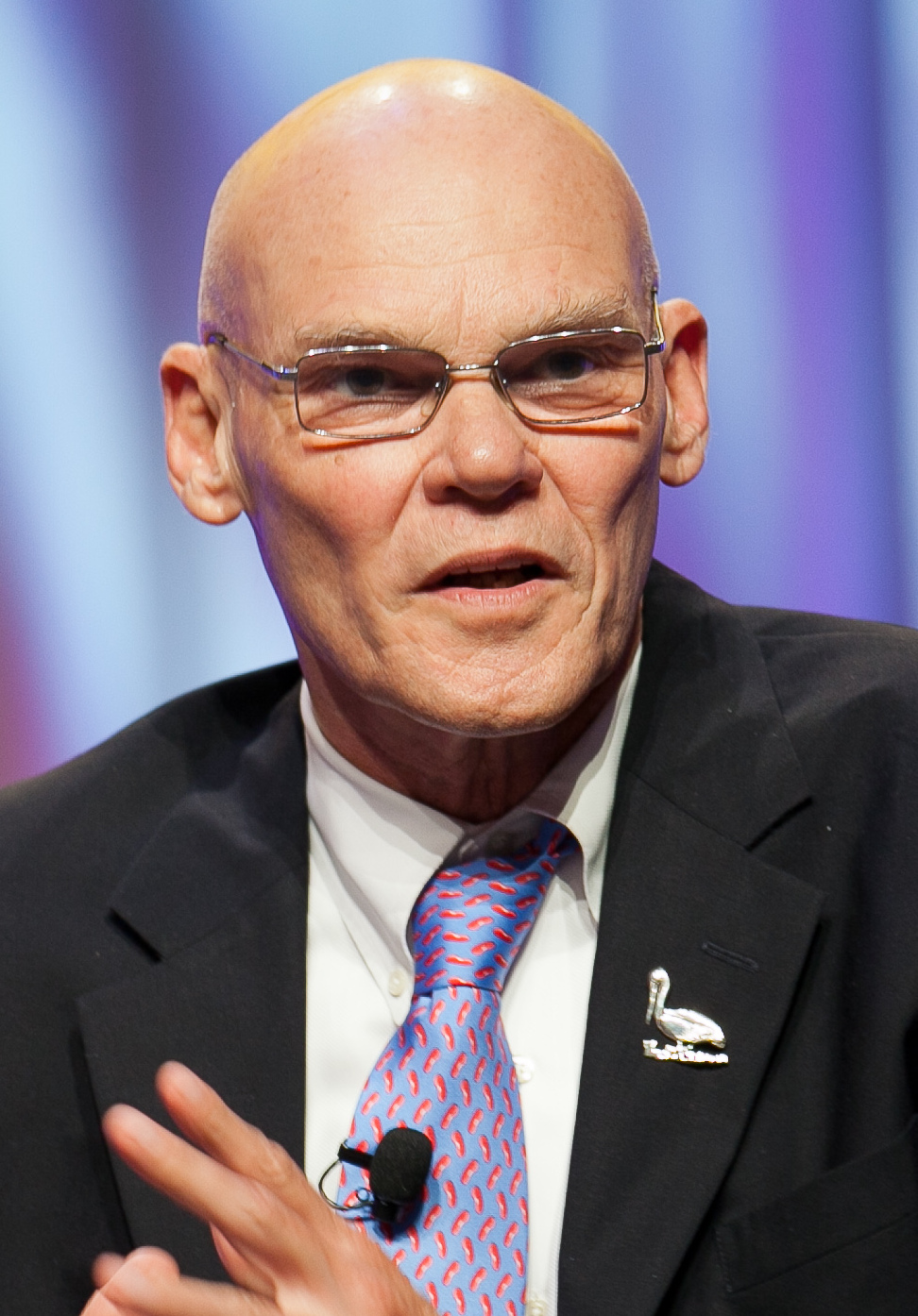
- Carville in 2011

Personal details
- Born: Chester James Carville Jr. October 25, 1944 (age 82) Fort Benning, Georgia, U.S.
- Party: Democratic
- Spouse: Mary Matalin (m. 1993)
- Children: 2
- Education: Louisiana State University (BS, JD)
- Nickname: Ragin' Cajun

Military service
- Branch/service: United States Marine Corps
- Years of service: 1966–1968
- Rank: Corporal

Chester James Carville Jr. (born October 25, 1944) is an American political consultant, author, and television pundit who has strategized for Democratic candidates for public office in the United States and for international politicians in at least 23 countries abroad. A prominent media figure, he has frequently appeared on cable news programs and talk shows as a commentator on U.S. politics.

Nicknamed the "Ragin' Cajun", Carville led successful state campaigns before gaining national attention as a lead strategist in Bill Clinton's winning 1992 presidential campaign. He also played a principal role crafting in the campaigns of several Democratic presidential candidates, including Massachusetts Senator John Kerry in 2004, New York Senator Hillary Clinton in 2008, and Colorado Senator Michael Bennet in 2020. He is married to longtime Republican political consultant Mary Matalin.

== Early life and education ==
Carville was born on October 25, 1944, in Fort Benning, Georgia, to Angele Lucille (née Normand), a World Book Encyclopedia salesperson, and Chester James Carville, a United States Army soldier and later store owner. His maternal family is of French Cajun descent, and his paternal great-grandfather was an Irish-born immigrant who served in the Union army during the American Civil War.

Carville grew up with seven siblings in St. Gabriel, Louisiana; the family lived in the neighborhood of Carville, named after his paternal grandfather Louis Arthur Carville, who was once the area's postmaster. He graduated from Ascension Catholic High School in Donaldsonville, Louisiana, in 1962, where among his earliest political campaign work was ripping down the campaign signs of a candidate for public office during high school. He attended Louisiana State University (LSU) from 1962 to 1966, but did not graduate at the time, characterizing himself as "something less than an attentive scholar" who "had 56 hours' worth of Fs".

Carville enlisted in the United States Marine Corps in 1966 and was stationed at Camp Pendleton, California. He completed his service in 1968 with the rank of corporal. Carville resumed nighttime studies at Louisiana State University, where he earned a Bachelor of Science in general studies in 1970 and a Juris Doctor in 1973, and was a member of the Sigma Nu fraternity. From 1973 to 1979, he worked as an attorney at McKernnan, Beychok, Screen and Pierson, a Baton Rouge law firm.

== Political career ==
=== Early activities ===
As a college student, Carville distributed "hate sheets" about a political opponent at grocery stores on behalf of Ossie Bluege Brown, who ran for district attorney of East Baton Rouge Parish in 1972. By the late 1970s, he was working for Gus Weill and Raymond Strother at Weill-Strother, a political consulting firm that had assisted campaigns for Louisiana governors Jimmie Davis, John McKeithen, Edwin Edwards, as well as U.S. Representative Otto Passman. In the early 1980s, Carville served as executive assistant to East Baton Rouge Parish mayor-president Pat Screen. He later helped Cathy Long win a special election in Louisiana's now-defunct 8th congressional district.

=== State and local elections ===
==== 1984 Senate election in Texas ====
In 1983, Carville was recruited to run Texas state legislator Lloyd Doggett's campaign for an open Senate seat. He helped Doggett, a liberal, secure the Democratic nomination in a primary that included conservative U.S. Representative Kent Hance, and centrist former congressman Bob Krueger. During the primary, Carville notably used a rubber vertebrae exhibit and coached Doggett to use it as a prop to jokingly portray Krueger as a "flip-flopper" who lacked resolve and "backbone".

During the general election against Phil Gramm, a Republican, Doggett received a small-dollar contribution from a gay rights group, which he later returned after attacks from Gramm, who emphasized "family values" and "having people who believe in Christianity in charge of government", statements Carville criticized. On November 6, 1984, Doggett was defeated in the general election, polling 2,207,557 votes (41.5%), to Gramm's 3,116,348 votes (58.5%). Finding himself out of work after the defeat, Carville recalled, "I was scared to death, I was 40 years old, and didn't have any health insurance, I didn't have any money, I was mortified".

==== 1986 Pennsylvania gubernatorial election ====
In 1986, Carville helped Bob Casey Sr. win election as the 42nd Governor of Pennsylvania. Casey defeated Philadelphia District Attorney Ed Rendell in the Democratic primary in March, 56.5% to 39.6%. In the general election, Republican Lieutenant Governor Bill Scranton initially led after pledging to halt attack ads, though his campaign later drew criticism for a mailer sent to 600,000 potential voters that did the opposite. Carville responded by staging a media stunt, dumping 600,000 blank envelopes near Scranton's campaign headquarters and asking journalists, "How could you send out this many envelopes and not know about it?"

The race was virtually tied until five days before the election, when Carville launched a television commercial, titled "The Guru", portraying Scranton as a regular drug user during the 1960s and mocking his ties to transcendental meditation. The ad, which depicted Scranton as a meditating, long-haired, cannabis-smoking hippie against a backdrop of sitar music, was credited with tipping the scales in socially conservative rural areas of Pennsylvania where Carville chose to air it. Casey went on to win by a narrow margin of 79,216 votes out of 3.3 million cast, 50.7% to Scranton's 48.4%.

==== 1987 Kentucky gubernatorial election ====
Carville managed Kentucky businessman Wallace Wilkinson's 1987 gubernatorial campaign, presenting him as a self-made, anti-establishment candidate. Wilkinson won the Democratic primary by accusing his opponents of wanting to raise taxes and campaigning on creating a state lottery to generate public revenue.

Wilkinson, who had made his wealth in retail and real estate management, faced lawsuits over unpaid overtime and declined to release his tax returns. Carville later appeared on WLEX-TV and urged reporters to examine opponent John Harper's family, stating that "there might be problems with some of Harper's children." Harper subsequently acknowledged that his son had been shot and killed by police in Ohio in 1978 during a pharmacy robbery. Wilkinson won the general election with 504,674 votes (64.5%) to Harper's 273,141 (34.91%).

==== 1988 Senate election in New Jersey ====
Carville served as campaign manager to New Jersey U.S. Senator Frank Lautenberg during his successful 1988 re-election campaign against Republican challenger Pete Dawkins.

==== 1990 Georgia and Texas gubernatorial elections ====
Between 1989 and 1990, Carville assisted four-term lieutenant governor Zell Miller in winning the Georgia Democratic gubernatorial nomination in a five-candidate field that included Atlanta Mayor Andrew Young, state senator Roy Barnes, and former governor Lester Maddox. Miller campaigned on a conservative proposals such as shock-incarceration boot camps for first-time drug offenders, criticized Young over "an explosion of crime" in Atlanta, and emphasized a state lottery in lieu of tax increases. He won the August 1990 primary runoff against Young and later defeated Republican candidate Johnny Isakson in the November 1990 general election. Carville attributed Miller's victories to the appeal of the lottery issue and its ability to turn out white suburban voters.

While working in Georgia, Carville also consulted for former Texas Congressman and sitting state attorney general Jim Mattox. On advice from Carville, Mattox based his campaign on the claim that a state lottery would address Texas' revenue needs without additional taxes. During the Democratic primary, Mattox ran a television advertisement accusing his opponent, State Treasurer Ann Richards, a recovering alcoholic, of being a cannabis and cocaine user, and questioning her fitness for office. He ultimately lost the nomination to Richards but gained a reputation as a combative campaigner.

==== 1991 Senate special election in Pennsylvania ====
In April 1991, a Senate seat in Pennsylvania was vacated when incumbent John Heinz was killed in a plane crash. Governor Bob Casey Sr. appointed Harris Wofford, then state secretary of labor, to fill the position until a special election that November; Carville consulted for Wofford to retain it. Against the backdrop of the Gulf War and a struggling economy, Wofford's opponent, U.S. Attorney General Dick Thornburgh, was widely seen as aligned with President George H. W. Bush, making the race an early test of the administration's reelection prospects the following year.

During the race, Carville helped Wofford craft an aggressive campaign, including advertisements criticizing Thornburgh's use of government jets for travel to destinations such as Hawaii. Another advertisement linked Thornburgh to "the mess in Washington", drawing on anti-establishment themes. In the months before the election, Wofford overcame a 44-point polling deficit to win 1,860,760 votes (55%) to Thornburgh's 1,521,986 (45%). Wofford's victory brought Carville national attention and raised his profile within the Democratic Party ahead of the 1992 presidential election. Carville later consulted on Wofford's 1994 re-election campaign, which he lost to Republican Rick Santorum.

=== Work under Bill Clinton ===
==== 1992 presidential election ====
In 1991, Carville was enlisted to advise Arkansas governor Bill Clinton in his campaign against incumbent George H. W. Bush in the 1992 presidential election. In developing messaging, Carville emphasized several themes, including "change vs. more of the same", "don't forget health care", and "the economy, stupid", the last of which notably resonated with voters amid an ongoing economic recession.

Reports of an extramarital affair with Clinton by Gennifer Flowers emerged shortly before the 1992 New Hampshire Democratic primary. To defend Clinton, Carville alleged that Flowers was paid $175,000 by tabloids for the story and that "the mainstream media got sucker-punched" by her allegations, criticizing reporters for pursuing what he called "cash for trash" journalism. Following Clinton's 1998 admission under oath of having an affair with Flowers, she sued Carville for defamation of character. In 2004, a federal district court dismissed the case with summary judgment, which was then appealed by Flowers attorney Larry Klayman. However, in 2006, the U.S. Court of Appeals for the 9th Circuit affirmed the lower court's dismissal.

Despite Clinton's success in the primaries, he trailed Bush and independent candidate Ross Perot in presidential polls, and the Los Angeles riots in April 1992 reduced his media coverage. In response, Carville amplified Clinton's criticism of hip-hop artist Sister Souljah in a speech delivered in June 1992. Souljah had remarked: "If black people kill black people every day, why not have a week and kill white people?" Clinton responded by stating, "If you took the words, 'white' and 'black' and you reversed them, you might think David Duke was giving that speech." The speech gained national attention and appealed to moderate voters, but it also caused a rift between Clinton and some African Americans within the Democratic Party, including Jesse Jackson, who argued that Souljah's remarks had been misinterpreted.

In 1993, following Clinton's election as president, Carville was named Campaign District Manager of the Year by the American Association of Political Consultants. His role in the Clinton campaign was documented in the Academy Award-nominated documentary film The War Room, released the same year.

==== Work in the White House ====
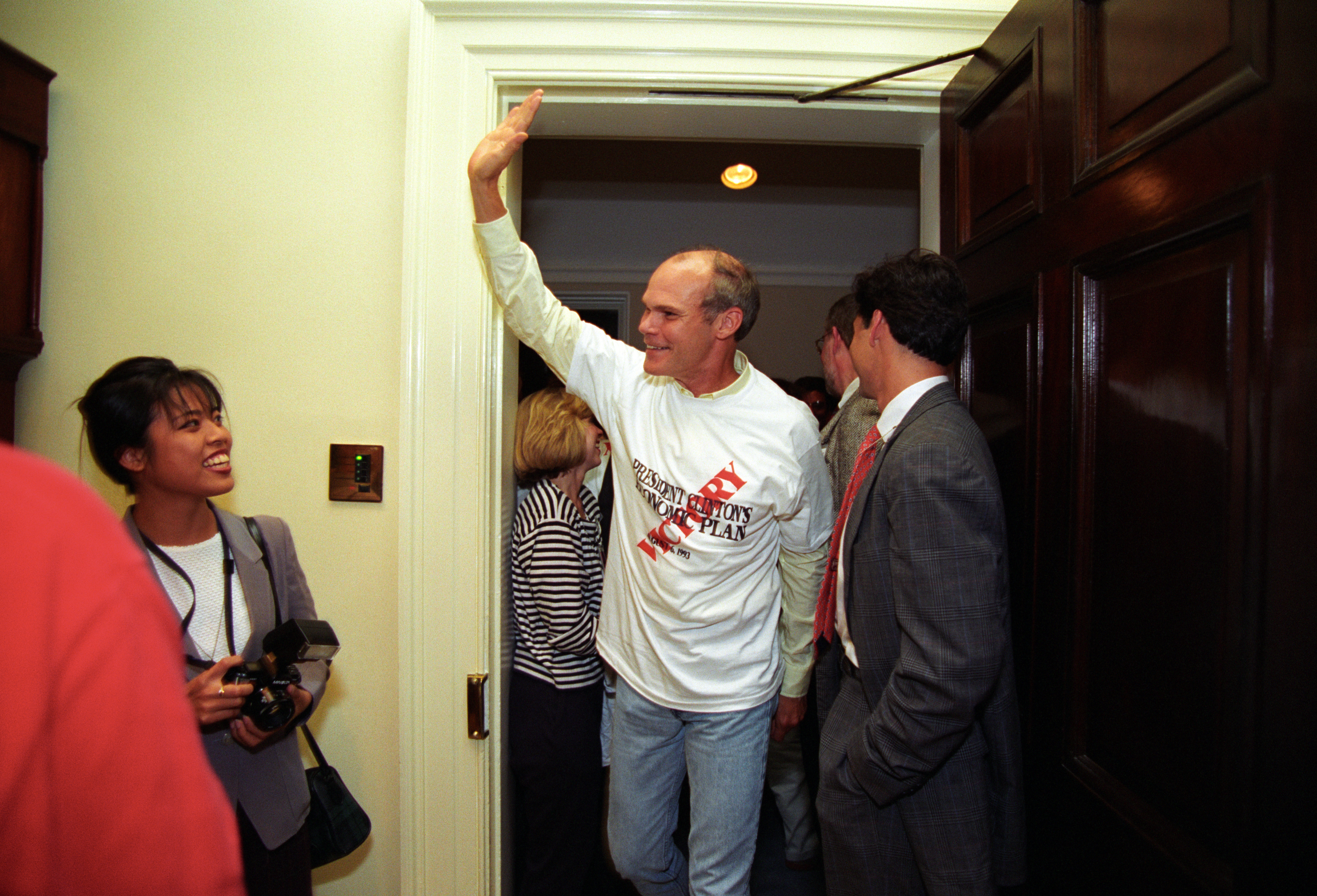
Carville on the night of the Senate vote for the Omnibus Budget Reconciliation Act of 1993

In late 1992 and early 1993, Carville consulted for San Fernando Valley state assemblyman Richard Katz in his campaign for the 1993 Los Angeles mayoral election, the first in 63 years without an incumbent on the ballot. Katz ran on a tough-on-crime platform that included gun control, proposed sales taxes on firearms and ammunition, and the sale of city-owned assets such as Ontario International Airport to fund police overtime, while pledging not to raise property taxes. Despite hiring Carville and spending about $1 million on television advertising, Katz finished fourth in the nonpartisan primary with 46,173 votes (9.73%), and did not advance to the general election.

Carville continued to serve the Democratic National Committee in a political capacity during the 1990s, and frequently advised Clinton on political matters. He was among a small number of individuals granted a permanent "Non-Government Service" security badge, issued to non-government employees such as contractors who required regular access to the White House grounds. As a condition of the badge, Carville underwent an FBI background check similar to those used for security clearances.

In response to the 1997 civil lawsuit filed by Arkansas state employee Paula Jones against Clinton alleging sexual harassment while attending an official conference, Carville remarked, "Drag a hundred dollars through a trailer park and there's no telling what you'll find." In 2018, Senator Lindsey Graham referenced the comment in relation to allegations made by Christine Blasey Ford against Supreme Court nominee Brett Kavanaugh. Carville later said that he had been “making a joke” at the time and added, "I'm always complimented when people use my lines; you always like to leave a little legacy out there."

=== 2000s ===
==== State Department work ====
Following the September 11 attacks, Carville proposed visiting Islamic nations on behalf of the U.S. government to do "some kind of propaganda," stating he would use his experience to "tell people about my country and what's available to them beyond hopelessness and terrorism." He added, "What the terrorists are after is the younger and increasingly poor population. What they are offering is not that much, but we are not doing a good job telling those young people the other side of the story. It's time we told them about choices they have without imposing American values."

On behalf of the U.S. State Department, Carville and his wife, Mary Matalin, met with a group of 55 Arab women political leaders during the 2002 United States midterm elections. Titled the "Women as Political Leaders" International Visitor (IV) Program", it was the first program implemented under the Middle East Partnership Initiative, a group of programs headed by then Deputy Assistant Secretary for Near East Affairs Liz Cheney. In addition to events with Carville and Matalin, participants met with congressional, state and local campaign staff, and observed campaign activities during their visits to Concord, New Hampshire; Dallas, Texas; Detroit, Michigan; Toledo, Ohio; Raleigh, North Carolina; and Tallahassee and Tampa, Florida.

==== 2004 presidential election and 2006 midterms ====
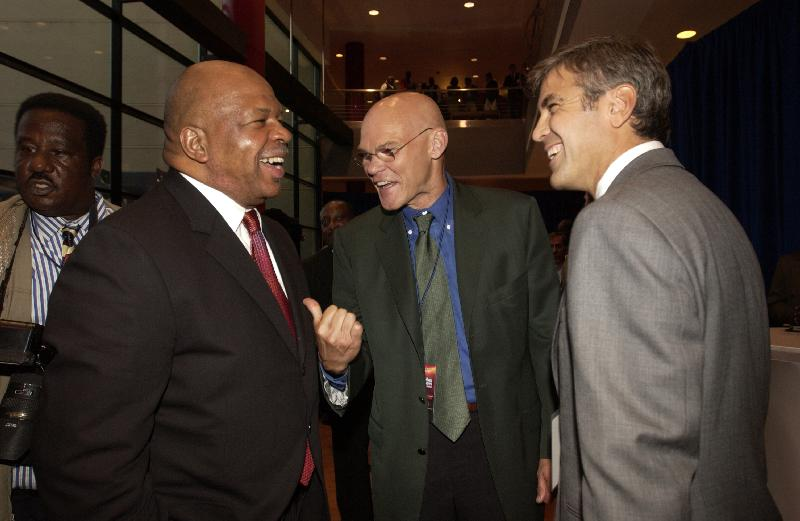
Elijah Cummings, Carville and George Clooney following the 2003 Democratic presidential debates

In September 2004, after discussions with Bill Clinton, Democratic candidate John Kerry enlisted Carville as an informal adviser to his 2004 presidential campaign. Following Kerry's defeat, Carville attributed the loss in part to external factors, including news coverage of the Iraq War, the release of a video by Osama bin Laden, as well as the Bush campaign's emphasis on cultural issues.

During the 2006 midterms, then Democratic National Committee chair Howard Dean implemented a fifty-state strategy, after which Democrats won control of both houses of Congress for the first time since 1994. Additionally, for the first time since the founding of the Republican Party in 1854, no Republican won a House, Senate, or gubernatorial seat previously held by a Democrat. Despite this, Carville criticized Dean's leadership in November 2006 as "Rumsfeldian in its incompetence," called for his ouster as chair and replacement with Harold Ford Jr., and argued that a more targeted strategy could have yielded as many as 50 House seats, roughly 20 more than Democrats won that year. Carville later partially retracted the statement.

==== 2008 presidential election ====
Carville advised Hillary Clinton during her 2008 presidential campaign. In 2007, he said that rival candidate Barack Obama was the Democratic candidate "most likely to explode or implode".

On March 22, 2008, Carville compared New Mexico governor Bill Richardson, who had just endorsed Obama for the presidential nomination, to Judas Iscariot, calling the endorsement "an act of betrayal." He claimed that Richardson, who had served in the Clinton administration in the 1990s, had indicated he remain neutral. Richardson denied this account, stating that he had made no commitment.

On May 13, 2008, a few hours before the West Virginia primary, Carville told an audience at Furman University in South Carolina, "I'm for Senator Clinton but I think the great likelihood is that Obama will be the nominee." The following year, Politico reported that Carville, Paul Begala, and Rahm Emanuel helped develop a Democratic strategy to portray conservative talk radio host Rush Limbaugh as the face of the Republican Party during the elections.

=== 2010s ===
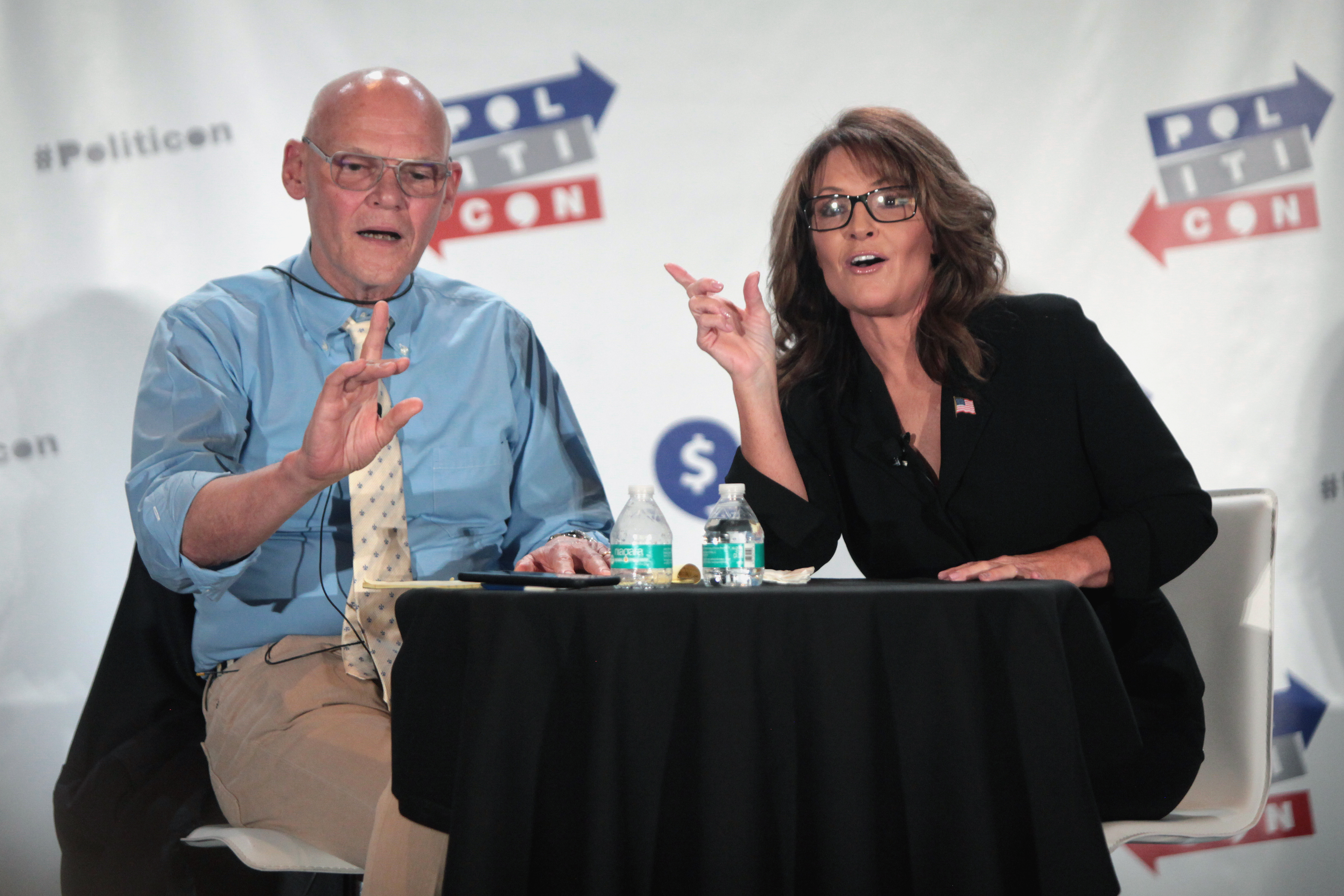
Carville and former Alaska Governor Sarah Palin at Politicon 2016

Following the Democrats' poor performance in the 2010 midterms, Carville told an audience at a Christian Science Monitor breakfast, "If Hillary gave up one of her balls and gave it to Obama, he'd have two." He had made a similar remark in May 2008 insinuating that Hillary Clinton was the tougher presidential candidate, stating, "If she gave him one of her cojones, they'd both have two." In November 2013, amid declining approval ratings for Obama, Carville remarked, "I think the best thing he can do is take a toke on the mayor of Toronto's crack pipe, because his numbers are about 48."

Carville was hired by Palantir Technologies as a paid adviser in 2011 and played a role in facilitating the company's collaboration with the New Orleans Police Department to quietly deploy predictive policing software.

In 2019, political pundit Mark Halperin worked with Carville on his book, How to Beat Trump: America's Top Political Strategists on What It Will Take. The collaboration drew criticism from many Democrats, as Halperin had been accused by multiple women of sexual harassment. Carville said, "I know he's been accused by a lot of people and lost his job. The guy called me and asked me to speak to him on a topic that I obviously care about. And I spoke to him."

=== 2020s ===
==== 2020 presidential election ====
In January 2020, Carville endorsed Colorado Senator Michael Bennet's unsuccessful campaign for the 2020 Democratic presidential nomination. He appeared on stage with Bennet at campaign events in New Hampshire ahead of the state's Democratic primary and described him as "John Kennedy recloned, you can't get any better than this guy!" Bennet, who emphasized Carville's endorsement, received 963 votes in New Hampshire (0.3% of 300,022 ballots cast).

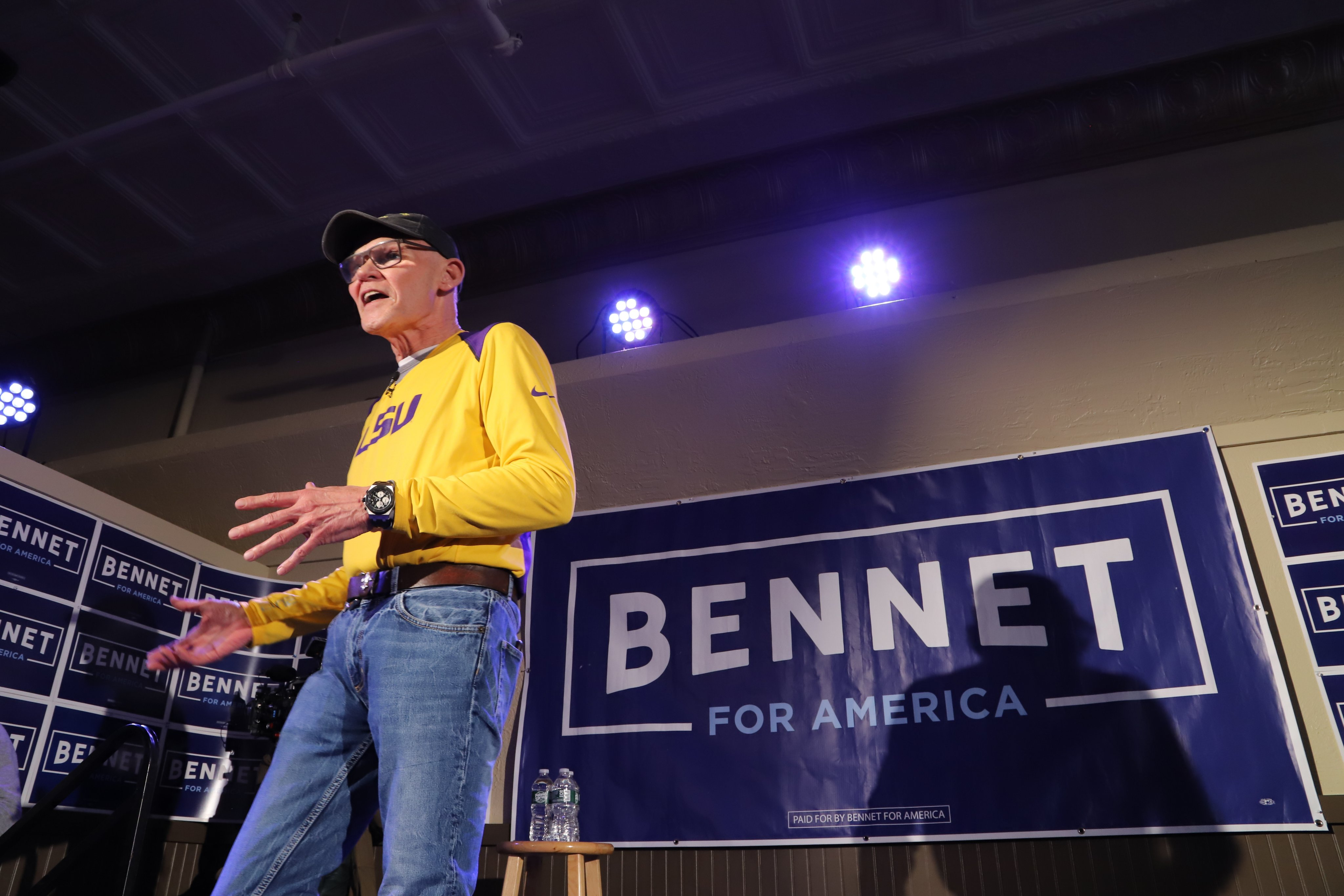
Carville campaigning for Michael Bennet in 2020

In February 2020, Carville suggested ending the Democratic presidential primaries and instead having House Speaker Nancy Pelosi select the party's presidential and vice-presidential nominees. He also suggested that Republican Mitt Romney resign from Senate and preside over the 2020 Democratic National Convention, and said that he might cast a write-in vote for Pelosi. That same month, as Bernie Sanders rose in the polls, Carville criticized prospect of his nomination, describing Sanders as a "communist" and his supporters as a "cult", and warning of severe electoral consequences. Furthermore, he also criticized the rise of progressive populist Democratic policy positions, including student loan debt relief and "people voting from jail cells", and opposed proposals to ban hydraulic fracking for shale gas.

In November 2020, Carville predicted that the result of the presidential election would be known by 10 p.m. on election night. After the Associated Press took four additional days to declare the winner, Politico described his prediction as among "the most audacious, confident and spectacularly incorrect prognostications about the year".

==== 2022 Pennsylvania Senate election ====
In 2022, Carville led the "Penn Progress" super PAC, which spent all of its funds supporting Representative Conor Lamb's bid for the U.S. Senate seat vacated by retiring Senator Pat Toomey of Pennsylvania. Lamb worked closely with the group and participated in donor calls arranged by Carville. The super PAC bankrolled television advertisements portraying one of Lamb's primary opponents, lieutenant governor John Fetterman, as a "self-described democratic socialist". Multiple fact-checking organizations disputed the claim, and media outlets reported that Fetterman had not described himself that way. An ABC affiliate in Philadelphia stopped airing the advertisement, and Senator Elizabeth Warren called on Lamb to disavow it. Carville also amplified commentary describing Fetterman as a "silver spoon socialist."

==== 2024 presidential election ====
Ahead of the 2024 presidential election, Carville argued in an interview with Maureen Dowd that the Democratic Party's political culture had become "too dominated by preachy females", which he said contributed to declining support among Black male voters. Following Joe Biden's poor performance during a June 27, 2024 debate against Donald Trump, Carville was among those who called for Biden to end his re-election bid. In an interview with Jake Tapper on July 1, he said, "The country wants something new. Let them have it." Carville's biographical documentary film Carville: Winning Is Everything, Stupid!, which premiered at the 2024 Telluride Film Festival, covers an 18-month period during which he advocated for Biden to end his re-election campaign.

== International elections ==
Beginning in the mid-1990s, Carville worked on a number of election campaigns abroad. He viewed such work as more lucrative and involving less reputational risk than campaigns in the United States, stating in 2009: "If you help elect a president and then you get involved in a governor's race and you lose, it's going to be a little bit damaging to your reputation. But if you go to Peru and you run a presidential race and you lose, no one knows or cares. So why go to New Jersey and lose for 100 grand when you can go to Peru and lose for a million?" Carville has been less forthcoming with the news media about his international work, remarking to the Los Angeles Times in 1999, "I won't comment on anything I do outside the U.S."

=== Greece ===
In 1993, Carville, his wife, and Clinton associate Paul Begala advised incumbent Prime Minister of Greece Konstantinos Mitsotakis in a parliamentary election during which the Greek press alleged United States interference. Unpopular due to his policies of economic austerity and privatization, Mitsotakis was defeated in his reelection bid by social democrat Andreas Papandreou.

=== Brazil ===
In 1994, Carville worked with Fernando Henrique Cardoso in Brazil during his successful presidential campaign.

=== Honduras ===
In 1997, Carville consulted in Honduras for the presidential campaign of Carlos Roberto Flores. Vowing to move Honduras beyond its image as a banana and coffee exporter, Flores campaigned on a "New Agenda" platform, which included a ten-point plan to privatize the economy and pursue austerity. He defeated opponent Nora Gúnera de Melgar by 195,418 votes, about 10% of the 1,885,388 cast. Gúnera de Melgar's campaign was aided by political consultant Dick Morris, who said he was unaware of Carville's involvement until after the election.

=== Ecuador ===
In 1998, Carville worked in Ecuador for Jamil Mahuad during his successful presidential campaign.

=== Panama ===
In 1998, Panama's Democratic Revolutionary Party (PRD) retained Carville as its main adviser in an effort to enable term-limited President Ernesto Pérez Balladares to seek reelection, amid opposition claims that he sought to convey U.S. support from the Clinton administration for a second term. Despite significant spending by the PRD, the proposal to lift term limits was defeated by nearly a 2-to-1 margin.

=== Israel ===
At the suggestion of the Clinton administration, which had grown frustrated with Israeli prime minister Benjamin Netanyahu's approach towards the peace process with Palestine, Carville, along with Bob Shrum, a Clinton speechwriter, and Stan Greenberg, a pollster, consulted in late 1998 and early 1999 for Israeli Labor Party candidate Ehud Barak in preparation for the 1999 general election. Carville, Shrum, and Greenberg sought to help Barak use campaign techniques such as sound bites, repetition, wedge issues, and televised attack advertisements, in what Netanyahu's communications director, David Bar-Illan, characterized as an "Americanization" of the election. Barak won the election by a double-digit margin and served as prime minister until 2001.

=== Argentina ===
In 1999, Carville consulted for Argentine Justicialist Party nominee Eduardo Duhalde in his presidential campaign. By then, Carville's consulting fee exceeded $30,000 per month. He later clashed with Duhalde's public relations team ahead of the election, leading to his departure.

Carville later served as adviser to Daniel Scioli during his successful 2007 and 2011 campaigns for the governor of Buenos Aires. He also consulted for Scioli's unsuccessful presidential campaign in 2015. The election featured allegations of vote buying, with Scioli's Front for Victory accused of distributing food items such as cooking oil, pasta and flour to Buenos Aires voters in exchange for support.

=== Bolivia ===
In 2002, through his firm Greenberg Carville Shrum (GCS), Carville worked in Bolivia on behalf of Revolutionary Nationalist Movement (MNR) presidential candidate Gonzalo Sánchez de Lozada. Sánchez de Lozada had previously served as president from 1993 to 1997, and was associated with policies of economic liberalization and privatization. In the campaign, he faced a significant challenge from Evo Morales of the left-wing populist Movement for Socialism (MAS).

Carville helped develop a media-focused campaign under the slogan "Bolivia sí puede" ("Yes, Bolivia can"), which included negative advertisements targeting opponents, particularly Cochabamba mayor Manfred Reyes Villa; one advertisement blamed him for rampant diarrhea affecting children in the city. Sanchez de Lozada won a plurality of the vote, 22.46% to Morales's 20.94%, and took office in August 2002 as head of a coalition government. Carville's work in Bolivia was portrayed in the 2005 documentary Our Brand Is Crisis, which later inspired the 2015 film of the same name.

=== Venezuela ===
In early 2003, Carville worked in Venezuela as an adviser to business interests that had supported a major strike in April 2002 by managers of the national oil company, Petróleos de Venezuela, S.A. (PDVSA), aimed at pressuring the government of leftist president Hugo Chávez. In a 2006 interview, Carville remarked: "I've worked in Venezuela and I would be very reluctant to call Chávez a democrat."

=== Afghanistan ===
In 2009, Carville was hired by Afghan presidential candidate Ashraf Ghani as a volunteer. They had met in Washington, D.C., in the spring of that year through mutual friends. Carville described the 2009 Afghan presidential election as "probably the most important election held in the world in a long time," and called his role "probably the most interesting project I have ever worked in my life." When asked about similarities between politics in Afghanistan and Louisiana, he remarked, "Yeah, I felt a little bit at home, to be honest with you."

Carville's objective was to help prevent one of Ghani's opponents, incumbent Hamid Karzai, from securing a majority and thereby force a second round. While Karzai fell just short of a 50% majority, Ghani garnered just 2.94% of the vote and did not advance to the runoff. He was later elected president in 2014.

=== Colombia ===
In 2010, Carville worked under Colombian presidential candidate Juan Manuel Santos. He assisted in analyzing polling data, and helped develop campaign strategy, which included the night-time distribution of pamphlets under voters' doors predicting the end of popular social welfare initiatives if Santos wasn't elected. Santos was elected president and inaugurated on August 7, 2010, amid a diplomatic crisis with Venezuela.

== Other ventures ==
=== Public engagement ===
In 2004, The New York Times reported that Carville was delivering more than 100 speeches annually to audiences including business groups, schools, and Democratic Party fundraising events. Charles Lewis of the Center for Public Integrity said that "No political consultant has carved a space as unique as his", while Democracy 21 president Fred Wertheimer described him as "a walking conglomerate." Former White House press secretary Joe Lockhart characterized Carville as "a multimedia corporation" and a model for the growing prominence of political consultants as public figures. Carville was represented exclusively by the Washington Speakers Bureau, with a 2004 speaking fee of $20,500 per hour of engagement, plus first class expenses and accommodations.

Carville has had a range of commercial endorsements, and appeared in print and television advertisements for leading brands including Coca-Cola, Little Debbie, Maker's Mark, Heineken, Alka-Seltzer, American Express, Nike, the National Cotton Council of America, and Ariba. In 2000, he participated in a sponsorship involving Playboy and Captain Morgan rum, which included a visit to the Playboy Mansion.

=== Teaching ===
In 2005, Carville taught a semester of the course "Topics in American Politics" at Northern Virginia Community College. Guest speakers included Al Hunt, Mark Halperin, George Allen, George Stephanopoulos, Stan Greenberg, Tony Blankley, representatives from the Motion Picture Association of America, and James Fallows. Three years later, he lectured in political science at Tulane University. He joined the faculty of Louisiana State University's Manship School of Mass Communication in January 2018; his position was supported by philanthropic gifts.

=== Media ===
Carville co-hosted CNN's Crossfire with Paul Begala from 2002 until the show's cancellation in 2005 and remained a network contributor until 2013. The following year, he joined Fox News Channel as a contributor. In 2019, Carville and Al Hunt launched the podcast Politics War Room with James Carville & Al Hunt.

In 2006, Carville became a host of the XM Satellite Radio sports program 60/20 Sports alongside Luke Russert. The show explored sports culture through the generational perspectives of its hosts. That same year, Carville served as executive producer of the film All the King's Men, which is loosely based on the life of Louisiana governor Huey Long.

== Personal life ==
Since 1993, Carville has been married to Republican and later Libertarian political consultant Mary Matalin; they have two daughters. In 2008, the couple relocated from Virginia to New Orleans while maintaining a home in Bay St. Louis, Mississippi. In 2014, they released a joint memoir, Love & War: Twenty Years, Three Presidents, Two Daughters and One Louisiana Home, which discusses their differing political views.

Carville has attention deficit hyperactivity disorder (ADHD) and has spoken publicly about it for organizations like Children and Adults with Attention-Deficit Hyperactivity Disorder.

== Books ==
Politics

- All's Fair: Love, War and Running for President (1995), with Mary Matalin and Peter Knobler
- We're Right, They're Wrong: A Handbook for Spirited Progressives (1996)
- ...And The Horse He Rode In On: The People vs. Kenneth Starr (1998)
- Stickin: The Case for Loyalty (2000) with Paul Begala
- Suck Up, Buck Up... and Come Back When You Foul Up (2001)
- Had Enough? (2004)
- Take It Back: Our Party, Our Country, Our Future (2006) with Paul Begala
- 40 More Years: How the Democrats Will Rule the Next Generation (2009)
- It's the Middle Class, Stupid! (2012) with Stan Greenberg
- Love & War: Twenty Years, Three Presidents, Two Daughters and One Louisiana Home, (2014) with Mary Matalin
- We're Still Right, They're Still Wrong: The Democrats' Case for 2016 (2016)
- Bridges, Tyler, Jeremy Alford, James Carville and Mary Matalin (2016). Long Shot: A Soldier, a Senator, a Serious Sin, an Epic Louisiana Election. ISBN 9780-692-79533-0.

Children's fiction

- Lu and the Swamp Ghost (2004) with co-author Patricia McKissack and illustrator David Catrow

== Filmography ==
=== Film ===
Year	Title	Role	Notes
1993	The War Room	Himself	Documentary
1996	The People vs. Larry Flynt	Simon Leis	Hamilton County Prosecuting Attorney
2003	Old School	Himself	Cameo
2005	Wedding Crashers	Himself	Cameo
2005	Our Brand Is Crisis	Himself	Documentary
2007	The Assassination of Jesse James by the Coward Robert Ford	Thomas Crittenden	Governor of Missouri
2011	The Muppets	Himself	Cameo
2013	G.I. Joe: Retaliation	Himself	
2024	Carville: Winning Is Everything, Stupid!	Himself	Documentary subject

=== Television ===
Year	Title	Role	Notes
1990s	Mad About You	Himself	3 episodes
1990s	Spin City	Himself	Guest role
2003	K Street	Himself	HBO series
2007	30 Rock	Himself	Season 2, Episode 8: "Secrets and Lies"
2008	King of the Hill	Judge Roland McFarlane	Voice role; episode "Jumpin' Crack Bass"
—	Family Guy	Himself (animated)	Episode "Running Mates"
—	Saturday Night Live	Portrayed by Bill Hader	Recurring impression
2016	Documentary Now!	Portrayed by Bill Hader	Episode "The Bunker"
—	Race for the White House	Himself	Documentary series
2024–	The Beat with Ari Melber	Himself	Recurring guest
