= Andy Inglis =

British engineer & corporate executive

- Born: 1960 (age 65–66)
- Education: Pembroke College, Cambridge
- Occupations: Engineer, business executive
- Years active: 1980s–present
- Employer: Kosmos Energy
- Known for: Former BP executive; CEO of Kosmos Energy
- Title: Chief Executive Officer, Kosmos Energy
- Awards: Fellow of the Royal Academy of Engineering; Fellow of the Institution of Mechanical Engineers

Andrew G. Inglis (born 1960) is a British engineer, corporate executive and CEO of Kosmos Energy.

== Early life and education ==
Inglis received an MA in engineering from Pembroke College, Cambridge University and joined BP plc in 1980. He is a Chartered Mechanical Engineer, a Fellow of the Royal Academy of Engineering, and a Fellow of the Institution of Mechanical Engineers.

== Career ==
He began his career in BP as a mechanical engineer, working on various North Sea projects. In the late 1980s, he moved to a series of commercial roles in BP Exploration in Aberdeen and London. After a period in the upstream executive office, in 1994 he moved to Alaska to serve as the manager for the Kuparuk field. He returned to London in 1996 as chief of staff for the upstream business. From 1997 until 1999, he was responsible for leading BP's activities in the deepwater Gulf of Mexico.

In January 1999, following the merger of BP and Amoco, he became vice president, US Western Gas business unit. In September 2000, he joined the upstream executive committee as a group vice president and became an executive vice president and Deputy Chief Executive of BP Exploration & Production in 2004. He was later appointed as an executive director of the BP Group and named chief executive of BP's Exploration & Production (E&P) business on 1 February 2007.

Inglis resigned from BP in 2010 and joined Petrofac in January 2011. He was appointed to the Petrofac Board in March 2011. Mr. Inglis leads Petrofac’s Integrated Energy Services division, which was formed in June 2011. He is also a former Non-executive Director of BAE Systems plc.

== Executive positions ==
2007–2010 Chief Executive of BP's Exploration & Production business segment and Executive Director BP plc

2007–2010 Non Executive Director and Chairman of Corporate Responsibility Committee BAE Systems plc

2011–2014 Chief Executive, Integrated Energy Services Petrofac

2014–present Chief Executive, Kosmos Energy

== Personal life ==
Inglis is married with five children aged between 18 years and 5 years (twins). His interests include golf, sailing, running and skiing.

== See also ==
- BP - (British Petroleum)
- Tony Hayward
- Petrofac - (Petrofac)
