= Big Men (film) =

2014 documentary film

- Directed by: Rachel Boynton
- Written by: Rachel Boynton
- Produced by: Rachel Boynton; Brad Pitt
- Starring: Jim Musselman, Brian Maxted, George Osuwu, Jeffrey Harris
- Cinematography: Jonathan Furmanski
- Edited by: Seth Bomse
- Music by: Nathan Larson
- Production companies: Gravitas Ventures; Boynton Films; Impact Partners; Screen Pass Pictures; Whitewater Films; BBC Films; Danish Broadcasting Corporation; Plan B Entertainment; Sundial Pictures
- Distributed by: Abramorama (United States)
- Release date: March 14, 2014
- Running time: 99 minutes
- Countries: US, UK, Denmark
- Language: English

Big Men is a 2014 documentary film produced and directed by Rachel Boynton. It examines the oil industry, the development of a new oil field in West Africa, the accusations of corruption that follow, and the resource curse. The film follows Texas-based Kosmos Energy as it attempts to start oil production in the new Jubilee Field off the coast of Ghana. With huge amounts of money at stake, Kosmos juggles its partners in Ghana, financial backers in New York, and the Great Recession that dramatically reduces oil prices. The film also visits Nigeria's oil-rich region, following American explorers at Kosmos Energy in Ghana and a militant gang in Nigeria's Niger Delta. The Niger Delta, where decades of corruption and lack of development fuel militants, who attempt to gain a share of the oil pie. The film was released on March 14, 2014, and received widespread critical acclaim for its in-depth and unflinching exploration of the complexities surrounding the oil industry in Ghana and Nigeria.

== Plot ==
The documentary "Big Men," directed by Rachel Boynton examines the oil industry in the African nations of Ghana and Nigeria. The film explores the tensions around newly discovered oil wealth, foreign investment, corruption, and the struggle between national interest and corporate profit. The film explores the tensions around newly discovered oil wealth, foreign investment, corruption, and the struggle between national interest and corporate profit. The film follows the story of the American oil company Kosmos Energy as it discovers a large offshore oil field in Ghana and endeavors to develop it.

The film begins by introducing the key players, including Kosmos Energy executives and Ghanaian political leaders. It then delves into the technical and logistical challenges of oil exploration and extraction in the region. As the oil development progresses, the film also explores the impact on local Ghanaian communities and the broader political landscape.

Alongside the story in Ghana, the documentary also examines the oil industry in neighboring Nigeria, focusing on the activities of the militant group MEND (the Movement for the Emancipation of the Niger Delta) and its efforts to disrupt the oil operations and challenge the government's control over the region's resources.

Through these parallel narratives, the film offers insights into the complex and often contentious relationship between multinational oil companies, local communities, and national governments in resource-rich African nations. It also raises questions about the distribution of wealth and power, as well as the potential for conflict and corruption within the oil industry in these contexts.

== Production ==
The crew filmed between 2007 and 2011 in Ghana and Nigeria. capturing the development of Ghana's first commercial oil field and the resistance in Nigeria's Niger Delta. Director Rachel Boynton and her cinematographer had unprecedented access to Kosmos Energy, allowing them to film inside the oil company and capture the intricacies of the global deal-making process. The film was shot by a small crew, with Boynton handling direction and Jonathan Furmanski handling cinematography, which allowed for a more intimate and nuanced portrayal of the story. Big Men premiered at the 2013 Tribeca Film Festival. The DVD release includes closed captions, chapter markers, and bonus scenes, providing additional context and insights into the film's themes and production.

== Reception ==
Big Men was acclaimed by critics. It holds a 90/100 on Metacritic and a 100% rating on Rotten Tomatoes. In The New York Times, Jeannette Catsoulis wrote that "this cool and incisive snapshot of global capitalism at work is as remarkable for its access as for its refusal to judge." Alan Scherstuhl of The Village Voice opined that the film "is no simple screed against tick-like profiteers growing fat on malnourished hosts," but instead "a richly detailed portrait." In The Washington Post, Stephanie Merry argued, "Boynton's most impressive feat in 'Big Men' is how she takes an impossibly convoluted scenario, makes sense of it, and tells a story that's riveting on its own but also serves as a parable about greed and human nature."
