= Rachel Boynton =

American film director

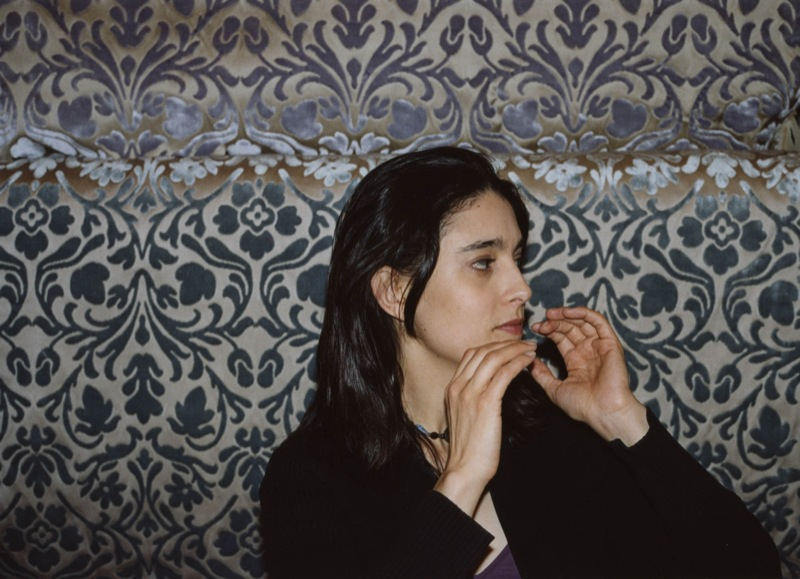
- Rachel Boynton for RES, 2006
- Occupation: Documentary filmmaker
- Years active: 2000-present
- Notable work: Our Brand Is Crisis, Big Men

Rachel Boynton is an American documentary filmmaker.

== Life and career ==
After graduating from Brown University, Boynton attended and earned degrees from Sciences Po and the Columbia University Graduate School of Journalism.

Boynton's directorial debut, Our Brand Is Crisis, premiered at South by Southwest in 2005. She worked as a bartender to allow herself time for the film's production. The film also screened at the Full Frame Documentary Film Festival, where Boynton won the Charles E. Guggenheim Emerging Artist Award.

Her next project, Big Men, was shot over four years in the oil fields of West Africa. Executive produced by Brad Pitt, the film was released in 2014 to critical acclaim. Boynton became a mother of two during the film's production.

In 2009, it was announced that George Clooney was helping develop a fictionalized adaptation of Our Brand is Crisis, with a script written by Peter Straughan. Production began in 2014, with David Gordon Green directing and Sandra Bullock in a starring role. The film was released in 2015.

After the release of Big Men, Boynton sought to move away from the cinéma vérité style of her previous work for her next project, while exploring the thoughts and feelings of the American public. Her most recent movie, Civil War (or, Who Do We Think We Are), focuses on the aftermath of the American Civil War, and how it has affected the communities involved hundreds of years after the fact. After previously having worked with Boynton on Big Men, Brad Pitt returned to Civil War as an executive producer. The documentary premiered on Peacock on June 17, 2021, with a television premiere on MSNBC in October of the same year.

== Personal life ==
Boynton is a resident of New York City. She has two daughters.

== Filmography ==
=== Film ===
Year	Title	Director	Writer	Producer
2000	Well-Founded Fear	No	No	Associate producer
2005	Our Brand Is Crisis	Yes	Yes	Yes
2014	Big Men	Yes	Yes	Yes
2021	Civil War (or, Who Do We Think We Are)	Yes	Yes	Yes

=== Television ===
Year	Title	Director	Writer	Producer	Notes
2000	People Like Us: Social Class in America	No	No	Associate producer	Made-for-TV movie
