= Our Brand Is Crisis (2015 film) =

2015 American comedy-drama film

- Theatrical release poster
- Directed by: David Gordon Green
- Screenplay by: Peter Straughan
- Based on: Our Brand Is Crisis by Rachel Boynton
- Produced by: Grant Heslov; George Clooney
- Starring: Sandra Bullock; Billy Bob Thornton; Anthony Mackie; Joaquim de Almeida; Ann Dowd; Scoot McNairy; Zoe Kazan
- Cinematography: Tim Orr
- Edited by: Colin Patton
- Music by: David Wingo
- Production companies: Participant Media; RatPac-Dune Entertainment; Smokehouse Pictures; Fortis Films
- Distributed by: Warner Bros. Pictures
- Release dates: September 11, 2015 (TIFF); October 30, 2015 (United States)
- Running time: 107 minutes
- Country: United States
- Language: English
- Budget: $28 million
- Box office: $8.6 million

Our Brand Is Crisis is a 2015 American comedy-drama film directed by David Gordon Green, written by Peter Straughan, and produced by George Clooney and Grant Heslov. It is based on the 2005 documentary film of the same name by Rachel Boynton. The film gives a fictionalized account of the involvement of American political campaign strategists Greenberg Carville Shrum (GCS) in the 2002 Bolivian presidential election. The film stars Sandra Bullock, Scoot McNairy, Billy Bob Thornton, Anthony Mackie, Ann Dowd and Joaquim de Almeida.

Principal photography began on September 29, 2014, in New Orleans, Louisiana. The film was screened in the Special Presentations section of the 2015 Toronto International Film Festival. It was theatrically released by Warner Bros. Pictures on October 30, 2015. It received mixed reviews, despite Bullock's performance being largely praised, and was a box office disappointment.

== Plot ==
In 2002, Bolivian politician Pedro Castillo hires an American political consulting firm (based on James Carville's Greenberg Carville Shrum firm) to help him win the 2002 Bolivian presidential election. The firm brings in "Calamity" Jane Bodine to manage Castillo's fledging campaign.

The opposition's top political consultant is Jane's nemesis, fellow American Pat Candy. In Bolivia, the situation is tense: Bodine learns that the indigenous people, who are a majority in the country but lack any real political power, are protesting for constitutional reform to get proper representation.

The American consultants, not knowing the Bolivian language or culture, are persuaded by Bodine, a burned out veteran of American politics, to follow a strategy of smear campaigning to make up for their candidate's shortcomings. However, Castillo refuses to give permission for the team to do so. It is only after Bodine arranges for the distribution of a flyer accusing Castillo of a long-ago affair (and blaming it on the opposition) does she finally convince him to smear his opponents.

In the following months, the team exercises a strategy of "declaring a crisis". They plan to frighten the people, with the aim of persuading them to vote for the unsympathetic but known Castillo rather than the younger opposition candidates. They even resort to publishing photos of their enemy with Nazi war criminal Klaus Barbie in the background, so that he has to deny being a Nazi.

Castillo's bus is stopped by a group of protesters who do not want the International Monetary Fund in Bolivia. Castillo promises them that he will not invite the IMF without a public referendum. Eduardo, a young volunteer of the Castillo campaign, is deeply impressed by this show of commitment.

Eduardo's loyalty comes mostly from the fact that Castillo, who was president at the time, took a young Eduardo on his arm during a rally in his town. Nevertheless, his brothers are much more skeptical of Castillo.

During the final debate, Bodine cites a quote in a conversation with Candy (knowing that he will give it to rival candidate Rivera for his speech) saying that "a great man" said it. Unfortunately, the quote is actually from Joseph Goebbels, Adolf Hitler's minister of propaganda.

Castillo wins the vote by a small margin. As one of his first actions, he invites the IMF into Bolivia, thereby breaking his promise. The deeply disappointed Eduardo visits Bodine in her hotel; she replies that she is not responsible for Castillo's actions. In her eyes, her job is done.

The disillusioned Eduardo joins his brothers at a demonstration of people demanding change. The police arrive and the demonstration quickly turns into a riot. Bodine and her crew join Candy on the way to the airport.

All of them, except Bodine, have already taken jobs as political consultants in other countries. When she realizes that she brought a liar into office, she has the car stopped and leaves to join Eduardo and the protestors.

== Cast ==
- Sandra Bullock as 'Calamity' Jane Bodine, a retired political consultant hired by an unpopular Bolivian politician to help him win the presidential election.
- Scoot McNairy as Richard Buckley
- Billy Bob Thornton as Pat Candy, Jane's nemesis, who leads the opposition's campaign.
- Anthony Mackie as Ben
- Ann Dowd as Nell
- Joaquim de Almeida as Pedro Castillo, the Bolivian Presidential candidate who hires Jane.
- Zoe Kazan as LeBlanc, a researcher who specializes in digging up dirt on candidates.
- Reynaldo Pacheco as Eduardo, a young volunteer who befriends Jane.
- Dominic Flores as Hugo
- Louis Arcella as Rivera
- Octavio Gómez Berríos as Pepe
- Luis Chavez as Abraham
- Tilda Del Toro as Pedro Castillo's secretary
- Carmela Zumbado as a reporter (cameo)
- Ricardo Vargas as Campaign Worker

== Production ==
On April 22, 2007, it was announced that George Clooney would produce a dramatization of the 2005 documentary Our Brand Is Crisis, along with Grant Heslov, and Warner Bros. would handle American distribution rights. Peter Straughan was set to write the script, with Clooney attached as a potential director and star for the film, about the 2002 Bolivian presidential election's campaign by James Carville's Washington, D.C.–based political consulting firm Greenberg Carville Shrum, which was hired by candidate Gonzalo Sánchez de Lozada. On December 11, 2013, Sandra Bullock was in early talks to star in the film, while Clooney chose not to direct, and his starring in the film was also unconfirmed at that time.

On August 21, 2014, Bullock's casting was confirmed, playing a retired political consultant called 'Calamity' Jane Bodine, and David Gordon Green was set to direct the film. On September 11, Scoot McNairy was added to the cast. On September 15, Billy Bob Thornton joined the film, and on September 18, Anthony Mackie joined the cast. On September 24, Ann Dowd joined the film. On October 10, Joaquim de Almeida and Zoe Kazan joined the cast, with Almeida playing Castillo, the former president of Bolivia, and Kazan playing a young woman who finds dirt on political candidates. On October 13, 2014, Participant Media announced that they would co-finance the film with Warner, while Jeffrey Skoll and Jonathan King would executive produce, along with Bullock and Stuart M. Besser. More casting was also announced, which included Reynaldo Pacheco, Dominic Flores, Louis Arcella, and Octavio Gómez.

Principal photography on the film began on September 29, 2014, in New Orleans, Louisiana, using 35mm film. Filming also took place in the Bonnet Carré Spillway in Norco in St. Charles Parish. Additional filming occurred in Puerto Rico and Bolivia.

== Release ==
In July 2015, Warner Bros. Pictures scheduled the film for an October 30, 2015, release, during the awards season. It had a wide release in 2,202 theaters for 21 days.

=== Home media ===
The film was released on DVD and Blu-ray on February 2, 2016.

== Reception ==
=== Box office ===
Our Brand Is Crisis grossed $7 million in the United States and Canada, and $1.6 million in other territories, for a worldwide total of $8.6 million, against a budget of $28 million.

The film opened on October 30, 2015, alongside Burnt and Scouts Guide to the Zombie Apocalypse. In its opening weekend, it was projected to make $5–7 million from 2,202 theaters, however only ended up grossing $3.2 million, finishing eighth at the box office. This was the lowest wide release opening of Bullock's career, beating 1996's Two If by Sea ($4.7 million). In it second weekend the film made $1.4 million, finishing 11th.

=== Critical response ===
On Rotten Tomatoes, the film has an approval rating of 36% based on 170 reviews, with an average rating of 5.3/10. The website's critical consensus reads, "Our Brand Is Crisis offers sporadic amusement and benefits from a talented cast, but ultimately lacks enough of a bite to add much of interest to the political satire genre." On Metacritic, the film has a weighted average score of 53 out of 100, based on 35 critics, indicating "mixed or average reviews". On CinemaScore, audiences gave the film an average grade of "C+" on an A+ to F scale.

Eric Kohn from Indiewire wrote that the movie is all about Bullock's performance, saying "she imbues her part with a ferocious energy that constantly elevates the straightforward material". Peter Debruge from Variety thought that Jane Bodine, played by Bullock, "is easily one of the best female roles of the last 10 years," while Benjamin Lee from The Guardian wrote that "Bullock seems blissfully unaware of the film's faults and delivers a performance that expertly plays on her strengths – her comic timing, wasted in lesser, plane-ready comedies, is on top form and she imbues her neurotic character with more than the thinly sketched quirks provided on the page; she commands a room when needed, perfects scenes of physical comedy and even turns a climax of forced sentiment into something poignant and believable"; he concluded that "while the film is patchy, Bullock's brand is confidently crisis-free".
