= Jaime Solares =

Bolivian trade unionist

Jaime Solares is a Bolivian labor leader, and a major figure in the Bolivian Workers' Center (in Spanish, Central Obrera Boliviana or COB), Bolivia's largest union confederation.
