= Stan Greenberg =

American pollster and political strategist (born 1945)

- Born: Stanley Bernard Greenberg; May 10, 1945 (age 81); Philadelphia, Pennsylvania, U.S.
- Education: Miami University (BA); Harvard University (MA, PhD)
- Political party: Democratic
- Spouse: Rosa DeLauro (m. 1978)
- Children: 3

Stanley Bernard Greenberg (born May 10, 1945) is an American pollster and political strategist affiliated with the Democratic Party. Greenberg is a founding partner of Greenberg Quinlan Rosner Research (GQR) and Democracy Corps, political consulting and research firms headquartered in Washington, D.C.

According to Guardian writer Suzanne Goldenberg, Greenberg's work was crucial in electing Bill Clinton as President of the United States, Tony Blair as Prime Minister of the United Kingdom, and Isaac Herzog as President of Israel. Greenberg has written extensively about race relations in South Africa, and assisted Nelson Mandela's successful campaign in the 1994 South African general election.

== Early life and career ==
Greenberg grew up in a Jewish family in Washington, D.C. In an article for Pacific Standard titled "Why Are You So Smart, Stan Greenberg?", Greenberg explained that a high school course called "American Civilization" partially inspired him to seek a career in politics. A political scientist who received his bachelor's degree from Miami University and his Ph.D. from Harvard, Greenberg spent a decade teaching at Yale University before becoming a political consultant. Greenberg was a Guggenheim Fellow in 1976.

Greenberg's 1985 study of Reagan Democrats in Macomb County, Michigan, became a classic of progressive political strategy and the basis for his continuing argument that Democrats must actively work to present themselves as populists advocating the expansion of opportunity for the middle class. In 2021, Greenberg argued that educated and affluent white middle class Republicans who oppose the policies and social views of Donald Trump had voted for Joe Biden in the 2020 United States presidential election. Greenberg referred to these voters as "Biden Republicans", and argued they could harm the long-term electoral strength of the Republican Party.

== Political consulting career ==
As the pollster for Clinton in the 1992 United States presidential election, Greenberg was a major figure in the famed campaign "war room" (and subsequently the documentary film of the same name). He was the CEO and principal owner of Democratic polling firm Greenberg Quinlan Rosner until 2016. After that, Greenberg was solely involved in Greenberg Research, where he is the CEO. Along with James Carville and Bob Shrum, he co-founded Democracy Corps, a non-profit organization that produces left-leaning political strategy. He was previously a partner at Greenberg Carville Shrum, a political campaign consultancy firm. Greenberg is a noted advocate of progressive economic policies, and collaborated with left-wing think tank Economic Policy Institute (EPI) on a seminar titled "It's The Middle Class, Stupid!".

In May 2010, Greenberg was linked to a controversy involving White House Chief of Staff Rahm Emanuel. As a member of the House of Representatives, Emanuel had lived rent-free for five years in a basement guest room in the Washington, D.C. house owned by Greenberg and his wife, Rosa DeLauro, herself also a Democratic member of the House. During this time, Emanuel served as chairman of the Democratic Congressional Campaign Committee, which awarded large polling contracts to Greenberg's firm. Greenberg's former corporate clients include BP, British Airways, Monsanto Company, Boeing, General Motors and Microsoft.

=== International political work ===
Greenberg advised the presidential campaigns of Bill Clinton and Al Gore, as well as hundreds of other candidates and organizations in the United States, Latin America, Europe, and around the world, including Nelson Mandela, Ehud Barak (the former Israeli prime minister), Gerhard Schröder (the former Chancellor of Germany), and Tony Blair (the former Prime Minister of the United Kingdom). During his work for the Austrian SPÖ in 2001, Greenberg was criticized by FPÖ leader Jörg Haider over allegations of negative campaigning. Greenberg works as a political consultant to the Greek prime minister Kyriakos Mitsotakis.

== Personal life ==
Greenberg is married to Congresswoman Rosa DeLauro, who represents Connecticut's 3rd congressional district. Public financial disclosures filed in Congress indicate Greenberg's company, Greenberg Research, is worth up to $5 million.

== Books ==
External videos
- Booknotes interview with Greenberg on Middle Class Dreams, April 9, 1995, C-SPAN
- Washington Journal interview with Greenberg on The Two Americas, January 8, 2004, C-SPAN
- Presentation by Greenberg on The Two Americas, October 15, 2004, C-SPAN
- After Words interview with Greenberg on Dispatches from the War Room, May 27, 2009

- Politics and Poverty: Modernization and Response in Five Poor Neighborhoods (1974)
- Race and State in Capitalist Development: South Africa in Comparative Perspective (1980).
- Legitimating the Illegitimate: State, Markets, and Resistance in South Africa (1987)
- Middle Class Dreams: The Politics and Power of the New American Majority (1995)
- The Two Americas: Our Current Political Deadlock and How to Break It (2004) ISBN 0-312-31838-3
- Dispatches From The War Room: In The Trenches With Five Extraordinary Leaders (2009) ISBN 0-312-35152-6
- America Ascendant: A Revolutionary Nation's Path to Addressing Its Deepest Problems and Leading the 21st Century (2015)
- RIP GOP: How the New America Is Dooming the Republicans (2019) ISBN 978-125-0-31175-7
