= Bob Shrum =

American journalist

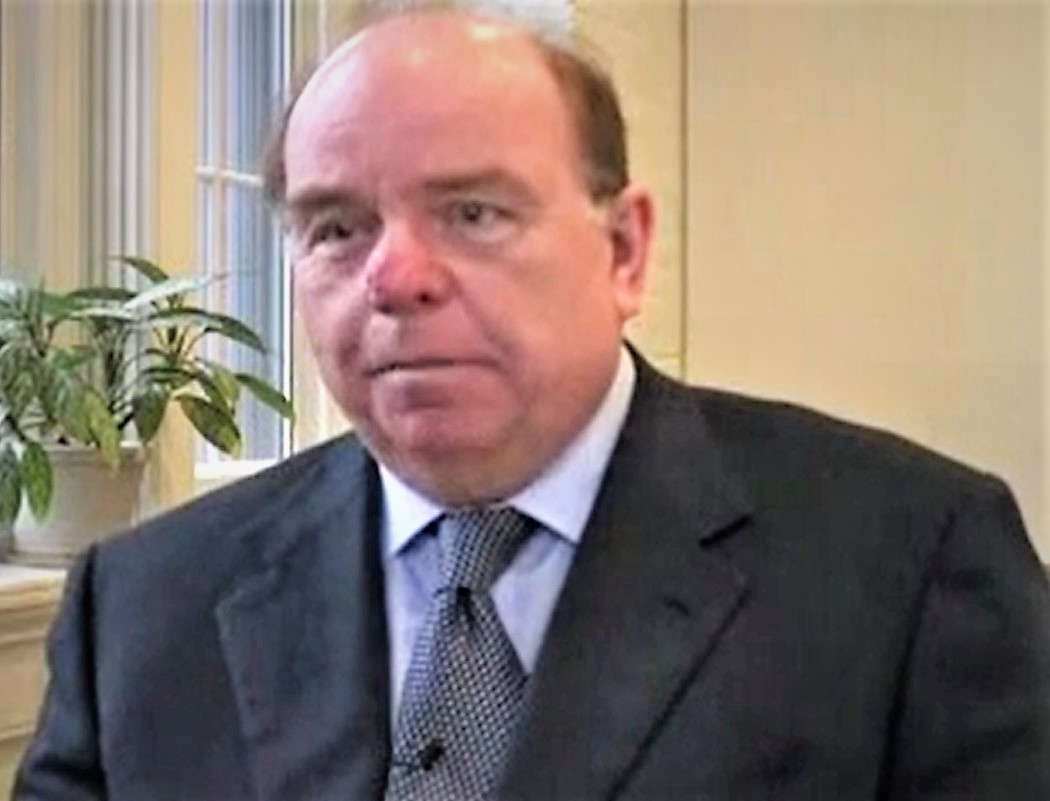
- Shrum speaks to the United States Studies Centre during the 2008 Democratic Party presidential primaries
- Born: July 21, 1943 (age 83); Connellsville, Pennsylvania, U.S.
- Education: Georgetown University (BA); Harvard University (JD)
- Spouse: Marylouise Oates (m. 1988)

Robert M. Shrum (born July 21, 1943) is the director of the Center for the Political Future and the Carmen H. and Louis Warschaw Chair in Practical Politics at the University of Southern California, where he is a professor of political science in the Dornsife College of Letters, Arts and Sciences. He is a former American political consultant, who has worked on numerous Democratic campaigns, including as senior advisor to the Kerry-Edwards campaign in 2004 and to the Gore-Lieberman campaign in 2000. Shrum wrote the famous speech Ted Kennedy gave at the 1980 Democratic National Convention conceding to and supporting President Jimmy Carter. He has been described as "the most sought-after consultant in the Democratic Party." Shrum served as speechwriter to New York Mayor John V. Lindsay from 1970 to 1971, speechwriter to Senator George McGovern's 1972 presidential campaign and speechwriter and press secretary to Senator Edward M. Kennedy from 1980 to 1984 and political consultant until 2009.

Shrum's book, No Excuses: Concessions of a Serial Campaigner, was published in June 2007 by Simon and Schuster.

== Early life ==
Shrum was born in Connellsville, Pennsylvania on July 21, 1943, the son of Cecilia (Welsh) and Clarence Shrum. His father was a tool-and-die maker and his maternal grandfather was a member of the Pennsylvania State Senate. His mother was from an Irish immigrant family. Shrum was raised in Los Angeles. He is a graduate of Loyola High School of Los Angeles and Georgetown University (where he was named the outstanding debater at the 1965 national policy debate championship, the National Debate Tournament). On December 21, 1965, he made his first television appearance as a law student, debating Henry Kissinger on a broadcast of the CBS program Town Meeting of the World. He later received a J.D. degree from Harvard Law School.

== Political career ==
=== Speechwriter ===
Shrum began his political career as a speechwriter in 1970, first for Republican New York City Mayor John Lindsay, and then for United States Senators Edmund Muskie and Ted Kennedy. Shrum was also a speechwriter for 1972 Democratic Party presidential nominee George McGovern as well as for 1976 Democratic Party presidential nominee Jimmy Carter. Shrum worked for Governor Carter for a total of ten days, and quit the night Carter won the Pennsylvania Primary. In his resignation letter to Carter, Shrum wrote "I am not sure what you believe in, other than yourself."

Shrum later worked for Ted Kennedy and wrote the famous speech Kennedy gave at the 1980 Democratic National Convention. After Kennedy's unsuccessful bid for the Democratic Party's presidential nomination in 1980, Shrum returned to work in his Senate office as his press secretary until 1984, after which he became director of Kennedy's Fund for a Democratic Majority Political Action Committee until 1985.

=== Political consultant ===
==== Non-presidential campaigns ====
In 1976, Shrum began work as a political consultant, designing campaign advertising and message strategy for Democratic candidates at the presidential, congressional, and gubernatorial levels, partnering with Pat Caddell and David Doak. Their first client was Jerry Baliles, who was running to succeed Chuck Robb as governor of Virginia.

The partnership with Pat Caddell dissolved in 1986, and Doak and Shrum continued to work together through a new firm for nine years. During their partnership, they served as strategic consultants and ad-makers for the successful campaigns of Bob Casey for Governor of Pennsylvania, Alan Cranston for reelection to the Senate in California, and Barbara Mikulski for Senate in Maryland. Mikulski would go on to become the first woman who was elected to the Senate who did not have a husband or father who served in high political office.

The firm continued to grow, acquiring new partners such as Peter Harris, Michelle Carrier, and Mike Donilon, while political consultants Joe Trippi and Steve McMahon began their media consulting careers at the firm.

Doak, Shrum, and Associates worked on the following campaigns, among others:

- The reelection of United States Senator Alan Cranston in 1986
- Ted Kennedy's United States Senate campaign in 1988
- David Dinkins for mayor of New York in 1989
- The reelection of United States Senator Paul Simon
- David Walters for Governor of Oklahoma
- Zell Miller for Governor of Georgia
- Richard Gephardt for election to Congress and Presidential bid
- The reelection of Denver mayor Federico Peña
- Art Agnos for mayor of San Francisco
- Tom Bradley for mayor of Los Angeles
- Alex Penelas for mayor of Miami-Dade County
- The reelection of Chicago mayor Harold Washington
- The reelection of Philadelphia mayor Wilson Goode
- John D. Waihee III for Governor of Hawaii
- Bob Kerrey for President in 1992
- John Glenn for United States Senate

In 1995, following the dissolution of Doak, Shrum, and Associates, Shrum partnered with Tad Devine and Mike Donilon. Devine, Donilon, and Shrum's firm went on to work for the following campaigns:

- Reelection of New York mayor David Dinkins (lost)
- Reelection of Ted Kennedy against Mitt Romney for United States Senate
- Reelection of Senator Chuck Robb from Virginia to the United States Senate
- Election of Herb Kohl to United States Senator from Wisconsin, and his reelection campaign in 1994
- Reelection of Tom Foley, Congressman from Washington (lost)
- Jane Harman for Congress in 1992, 1994, and 1996
- Reelection of United States Senator John Kerry from Massachusetts
- Reelection of Joseph P. Kennedy II, congressman from Massachusetts
- Reelection of United States Senator Tom Harkin from Iowa
- Election of Jack Reed for United States Senator from Rhode Island
- Election of Robert Torricelli for United States Senator from New Jersey
- Reelection of Congresswoman Louise Slaughter from New York's 25th district
- Parris Glendening for governor of Maryland
- Joe Lieberman for United States Senate
- Paul Sarbanes for reelection to the United States Senate
- Jon Corzine for United States Senate
- Bill Nelson for United States Senate
- Mark Dayton for United States Senate
- Ray Mabus for governor of Mississippi
- Bob Casey Jr. for Auditor General of Pennsylvania
- Frank Lautenberg for United States Senate
- Chris Dodd for United States Senate
- Harris Wofford for United States Senate
- Joe Biden for United States Senate
- Bernie Sanders for Congress
- Bill White for mayor of Houston

==== Presidential campaigns ====
In 1986, Shrum began work as a political consultant, designing campaign advertising and message strategy for Democratic candidates at the presidential, congressional, and gubernatorial levels. He worked for the Dick Gephardt campaign during the 1988 Democratic primaries, including Gephardt's surprise victory in the Iowa caucus, but after Gephardt's defeat, Shrum helped Democratic nominee Michael Dukakis in preparing for his debates against Vice President George Bush. Dukakis lost the general election.

In 1992, Shrum worked for Nebraska Senator Bob Kerrey, who was defeated for the nomination by Bill Clinton.

In 2000, Shrum helped Al Gore beat back a primary challenge from former New Jersey Senator Bill Bradley, and win the Democratic nomination. Gore won the popular vote in the November presidential election versus George W. Bush, but lost the electoral vote.

In 2004, Shrum worked on John Kerry's campaign, guiding him to a victory in the crucial Iowa caucuses and New Hampshire primary, and soon after, the Democratic presidential nomination, only for Kerry to be defeated in the general election by George W. Bush.

Described as a proficient political wordsmith, Shrum was involved in eight presidential campaigns but never for one who won a U.S. presidential election, a fact noted in the press.

Foreign campaigns

Shrum has also consulted on a number of foreign campaigns, including as a strategic advisor for the British Labour Party elections from 1989 to 2005, Ehud Barak's campaign for Israeli prime minister against Benjamin Netanyahu in 1999 and 2001, the Irish Republican Party Fianna Fáil in the 1997 and 2002 national elections, and the successful Bolivian presidential campaigns of Gonzalo Sánchez de Lozada in 1993 and 2002.

== Journalism ==
Shrum was a columnist for The Week magazine's website along with his conservative counterpart, David Frum. As a journalist, Shrum’s work appeared in New York Magazine, Los Angeles Times, The New York Times, and The New Republic, among other publications.

He was a columnist for the on-line magazine Slate.

== Academic career ==
Shrum has been a Senior Fellow at New York University's Wagner Graduate School of Public Service, where he taught a class on domestic policy formation and analysis. He also taught an undergraduate seminar to freshmen on Presidential debates and speeches since the 1960s.

He now holds the Carmen H. and Louis Warschaw Chair in Practical Politics at the University of Southern California. At USC, Shrum hosts regular talks, called "Political Conversations," with individuals from every side of the political sphere. The events are open to all students at the university. Shrum, a Democrat, serves as Director of the USC Center for the Political Future, and he shares the leadership post with Co-Director Mike Murphy, his long-time Republican rival and friend.

== Memoir ==
Shrum has written a political memoir entitled No Excuses: Concessions of a Serial Campaigner, published in June 2007. It has received attention in the media for its less than flattering portrayal of Shrum's former client, John Edwards.

== Personal life ==
Shrum is married to Marylouise Oates, a writer and former columnist for the Los Angeles Times. He has one stepson, the television writer Michael Oates Palmer.

== Media ==
Shrum's firm, Greenberg Carville Shrum (GCS), was featured in the 2005 documentary Our Brand Is Crisis depicting its work campaigning for Gonzalo Sánchez de Lozada during the 2002 Bolivian presidential election.
