= Carla Ortiz =

Bolivian actress

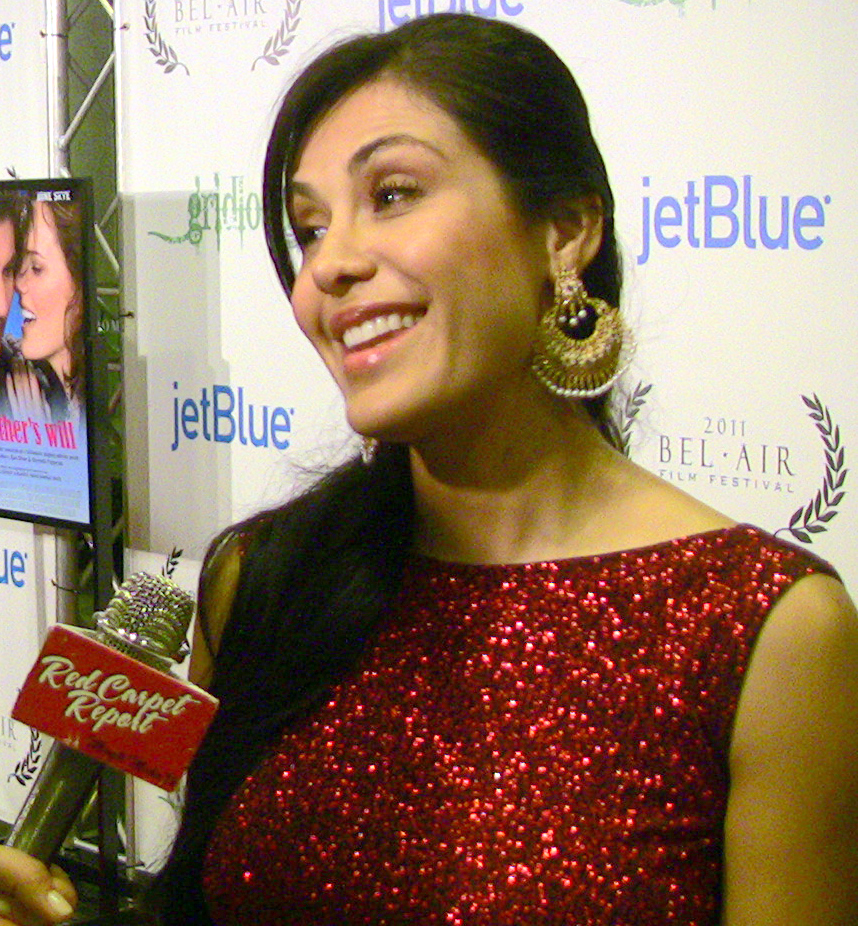
- Ortiz at the Bel-Air Film 2011 Festival red carpet on opening night.
- Born: Carla Ortiz Oporto; 2 December 1978 (age 47); Cochabamba, Bolivia
- Occupation: Actress
- Years active: 1998–present

Carla Ortiz Oporto (born 2 December 1978) is a Bolivian actress, model, producer, activist and philanthropist.

== Early life ==
Ortiz was born in Cochabamba, Bolivia in 1976 or 1978. During her childhood and teenage years she played competitive tennis, including occasionally in professional tennis tournaments. According to Ortiz, her father, who lost his father at age five, worked in a bank and also was a professional football-soccer player; her mother was the daughter of a successful immigrant from Portugal who had also been a professional boxer. Ortiz moved to Mexico City in the 1990s and later relocated to the United States, moving to Los Angeles in 2005.

== Career ==
Ortiz began modeling at age 13. She made her film debut in 1998 at age 19 in director Hervé Palud’s Mookie, a French comedy set in Mexico. That same year, she acted in her first supporting role on Mexican television in the telenovela Gotita de amor (Droplet of Love). She continued to earn television roles, including four other telenovelas from 1999-2001 including Mujeres engañadas and Secreto de amor.

Her film career has included starring roles in the 2025 Bolivian romantic comedy "Un milagro de Navidad en La Paz" and the 2024 movie of a Bolivian literary classic by Carlos Medinaceli "La Chaskanawi;" the 2017 thriller Curse of the Mayans (Spanish title: Xibalba, the name of the Mayan underworld); the 2012 American Western The Man Who Shook the Hand of Vicente Fernandez, alongside Ernest Borgnine in his final role; and in Olvidados (Forgotten), a 2013 historical drama about Operation Condor which she also co-wrote and produced. Forgotten was submitted as Bolivia's official entry in the 87th Academy Awards for Best Foreign Language Film, but was not nominated. In 2009, she starred in a Bolivian-Bavarian co-production "Write me postcards to Copacabana," in which she played a sexy flight attendant who is a young widow with a teenaged daughter. In 2007, she starred in a love story in the Bolivian movie "Los Andes no creen en Dios."

In 2022, she returned to television in Season 3 of the Telemundo/Netflix series La Reina del Sur, where she was featured in a recurring role as Karen Chacón.

== Controversy ==
Ortiz was accused in 2017 by journalist Christoph Reuter in Der Spiegel of engaging in Russian propaganda in relation to the Syrian Civil War, for her participation as a foreign celebrity in chaperoned tours of Syria. However, these accusations have been publicly criticized by Syrian-German musician Hanin Elias.

== Personal life ==
There is no record of Ortiz having been married. She does not have any children. She has been romantically linked to Venezuelan-born Sandro Finoglio, winner of the Mister World 1998 competition, actor and model for Mexican television and the co-owner of Churros Calientes eatery in Santa Monica, California (with Ortiz). On October 18, 2003, Ortiz attended the SHINE Awards at the House of Blues in Los Angeles, where she was photographed with Finoglio. Ortiz and Finoglio starred in the Spanish-language American telenovela Secreto de amor in 2001-2002.

== Filmography ==
=== Films ===
- Un Milagro de Navidad en La Paz (Christmas 2025)
- La Chaskanawi (2024)
- Juana Azurduy (TBA)
- The Curse of the Mayans (2017)
- Voice of Syria (summer 2017)
- Olvidados (Forgotten) (2013) - also producer, co-writer
- The Man Who Shook the Hand of Vicente Fernandez (2012)
- Escríbeme postales a Copacabana (2009)
- Los Andes no creen en Dios (2007)
- Shut Up and Shoot! (2006)
- Che Guevara (2005)
- Mookie (1998)

=== Soap operas ===
- Secreto de amor (2001)
- Primer Amor... a mil por hora (2000)
- Todo se Vale (1999)
- Mujeres engañadas (1999)
- Gotita de amor (1998)

=== Series ===
- La Reina del Sur (season 3; 2022-2023)
