= Carlos Bolado =

Mexican filmmaker

- Born: Carlos Bolado Muñoz; 1964 (age 61–62); Veracruz, Mexico
- Occupation: Film director
- Years active: 1985–present

Carlos Bolado Muñoz (born 1964 in Veracruz, Mexico) is a Mexican filmmaker.

He studied cinematography and sociology both in the same university, the National Autonomous University of Mexico. He has worked as a soundman and editor on several films. After making several short films, he ventured into the genre of film features with the film Baja California: The Limit of Time. The debut that brought high praise from both critics and the general public, becoming entitled to seven Ariel Awards, the highest recognition that Film Academy Awards in Mexico.

Later on, he co-directed Promises, which was nominated for an Oscar for best documentary. In 2006 he premiered his film Only God Knows, starring Diego Luna and Alice Braga, with good reviews. Since 2012 Carlos has directed a number of high-profile Mexican Films as well as T.V Shows all gathering praise. He is viewed as one of the most prominent and qualified directors in Latin America, being ranked on the Magazine "Quiens" list as the top 50 Mexican Artists of the Decade. Carlos Bolado has two children. He is recognized as one of the most prominent Mexican filmmakers of his generation.

== Filmography ==
- Laura (1986)
- Stroking in the mirror (1986)
- Opposite direction (1988)
- Golkobi (1990)
- Rites (1993)
- Old (1994)
- Baja California: The Limit of Time (1998)
- Promises (2001)
- Only God Knows (2006)
- River of Renewal (2008)
- Colosio: El asesinato (2012)
- Tlatelolco, verano del 68 (2013)
- Olvidados (2013)
- 3 Idiotas (2017)
