= Elia Petridis =

American filmmaker

- Born: Paris, France
- Education: University of Southern California
- Occupations: Director, screenwriter
- Years active: 2005 – present
- Organizations: Filmatics; Fever Content
- Website: www.filmatics.com; www.fevercontent.com

Elia Petridis (born in Paris, France) is a Lebanese-Greek film director and screenwriter, known for The Man Who Shook the Hand of Vicente Fernandez, and for his work in transmedia and virtual reality production. He is the founder and creative director of film production company Filmatics and the transmedia production company Fever Content.

== Early life and education ==
Petridis was born in Paris, France, and raised in Dubai. He attended Dubai English Speaking School, Dubai College, English College, and the American School of Dubai.

He relocated to the US to study film at the University of Southern California, where he graduated with a bachelor's degree in Critical Studies and a Master of Fine Arts in Film and Television Production.

== Career ==
Petridis made his professional screenwriting and directorial debut with the award-winning 2006 film How Henri Came To Stay. The film aired on KCET/PBS in California's 2006 Fine Cut Film Festival, screened at multiple film festivals, including the Cannes Short Film Corner in 2007, and won the Audience Award at the Beijing International Film Festival in 2007.

In 2012, he wrote and directed the film The Man Who Shook the Hand of Vicente Fernandez, which starred Ernest Borgnine in his final on-screen performance before his death and June Squibb. The film was awarded a production grant from Panavision, enabling Petridis to shoot on 35mm film, and was financed by multiple investors. The crew on the film included score writer Ruy Folguera, production designer Curt Beech, editor Terel Gibson, and cinematographer Eric Beech. The film premiered at the Newport Beach International Film Festival in 2012 and went on to receive positive critical acclaim. It was acquired by Indican Pictures in North America.

In 2016, Petridis directed the music video The Lost Sky for American singer-songwriter Jesca Hoop which received over 125,000 views on YouTube. He has directed music videos for Sub Pop, Def Jam, and Sony Music.

Later that year, he began writing, producing, directing, and creating the virtual reality horror transmedia world of Eye for an Eye in collaboration with Gnomes and Goblins virtual reality studio Wevr, including Eye for an Eye: A Séance in VR and Eye for an Eye: Henrietta. Petridis was a co-presenter and panelist on the Di-VR-sity Panel at San Diego Comic-Con 2016 in California, and his collaborators at Filmatics showcased Eye for an Eye at the Hollywood VR Summit 2016 and SXSW 2016. In 2017, he founded Fever Content, the transmedia production sister company to Filmatics, in collaboration with producing partner Craig Bernard.

Petridis has been a member of the Directors Guild of America since 2011.

== Filmography ==
Year	Title	Position	Notes
2005	Larger Than Life: A Cinematic Portrait of Michael Q. Schmidt	Production Assistant	Short Film
2006	Melody of Clock and Arrow	Editor	Short Film
2006	How Henri Came to Stay	Writer, director	Won: Audience Award at the Beijing International Film Festival
2012	The Man Who Shook The Hand Of Vicente Fernandez	Writer, director	
2012	Mother Mother: Little Pistol	Director	Music Video
2013	The Passage	Writer, assistant editor, husband	
2014	Forgotten	Writer	Spanish Title: Olivados Selection: Bolivian entry for the Best Foreign Language Film at the 87th Academy Awards
2016	Jesca Hoop: The Lost Sky	Director	Music Video
2016	Eye for an Eye: A Séance in VR	Writer, producer, director	Transmedia / VR Short
2016	Eye for an Eye: Henrietta	Writer, producer, director	Transmedia / VR Short
2017	Irontom, Brain Go	Director	Music Video

== Award ==
In 2007, Petridis' film How Henri Came To Stay won the Audience Award at the Beijing International Film Festival.
