= Greece–Syria relations =

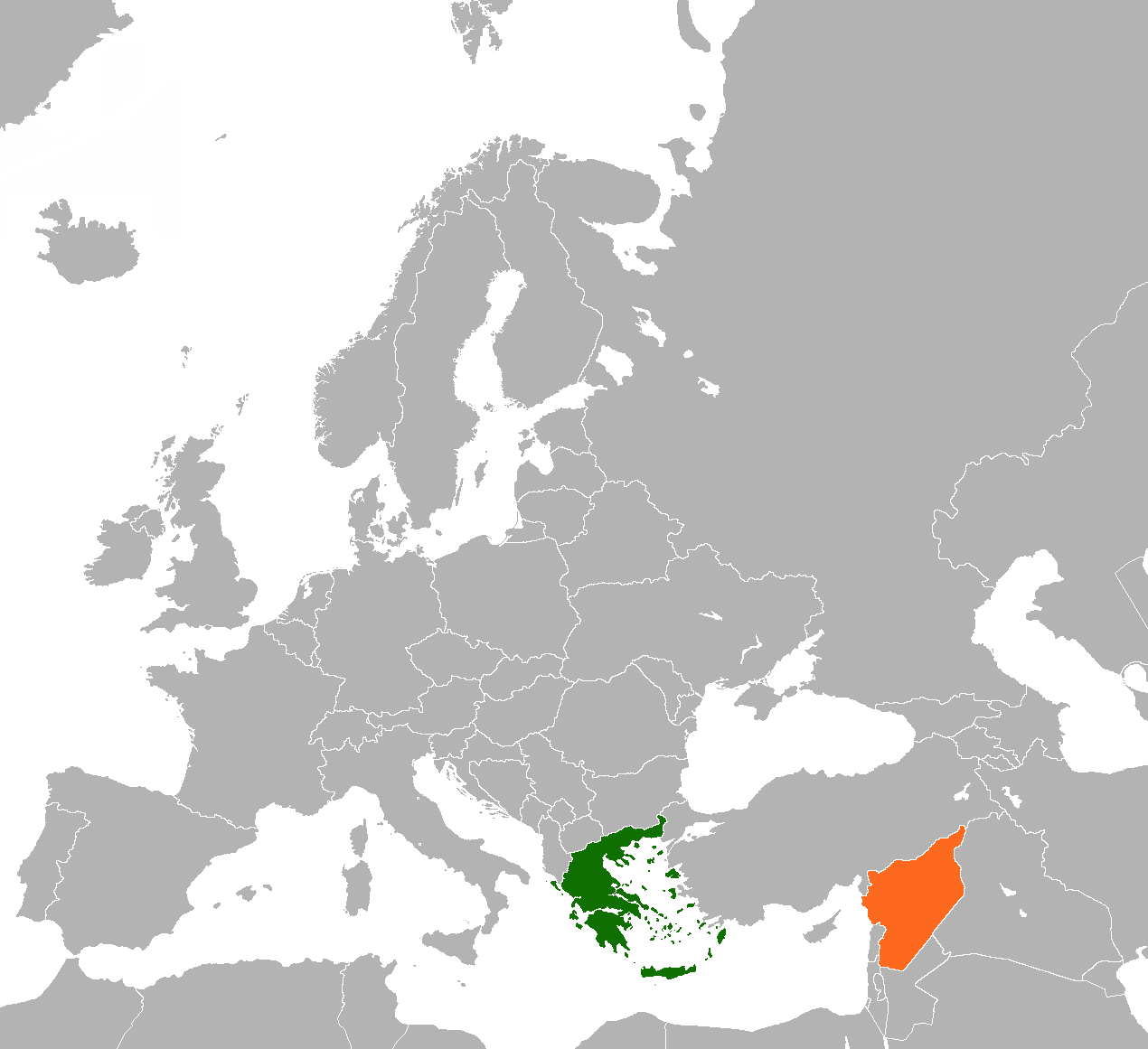
- Greece: Syria

Greece–Syria relations refer to the bilateral relations between the Hellenic Republic and the Syrian Arab Republic. Greece has an embassy in Damascus, and Syria has an embassy in Athens. Both countries are members of the Union for the Mediterranean, although Syria suspended its membership from 2011 until June 2025. The two countries share numerous common interests and a cultural and geographical relationship lasting more than 3,000 years.

== Factors affecting relations ==
- The two countries were exposed to colonialism and occupation, which made their positions against the occupation.
- The history of the bad Syria–Turkey relations, where Turkey occupies large lands of Syria (the most important Liwa Iskenderun) and regarding the Kurdish issue and PKK, the historical enmity between Greece and Turkey on Constantinople and Cyprus, Patriarchate of Constantinople and the border problem and others make the Syrian-Greek rapprochement and joint cooperation an important strategic alliance for both countries.
- Geographical proximity and the common cultural heritage between the two countries represented by Ancient Syria and the Greeks and Byzantine Empire. And the spread of culture and Greek language historically (where some rituals are still held in some churches in Syria are held in Greek) and Phoenician civilization in Greece.

== History of relations ==
=== Ancient era ===
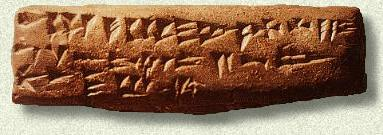
Ugaritic alphabet

Archaeological and historical evidence and documents indicate that the Syrian-Greek relations have started in the second millennium BC in general. The first contact between the two Mediterranean nations started with Cadmus introducing Phoenician Alphabet to Ancient Greece. In addition, Ugarit in Syria had also contact with Messinia and the Minoan civilization, until it was destroyed by the Sea People.

Thirty Ugaritic letters, which is known as the Ugaritic alphabet invented by Syrians from Ugarit. This alphabet moved thanks to the Syrian and Greek navigators to the country of Greece. Archaeological documents also indicate that the Messinians had communities in Ugarit, especially in its port Minet el-Beida, which bears a Greek name (Lokos Limen). This port was a great witness to the oldest commercial and cultural relations between the two countries, and the Greeks had large groups of merchants who, along with Ugarit merchants, supervised maritime trade, import and export.

=== Hellenistic era ===
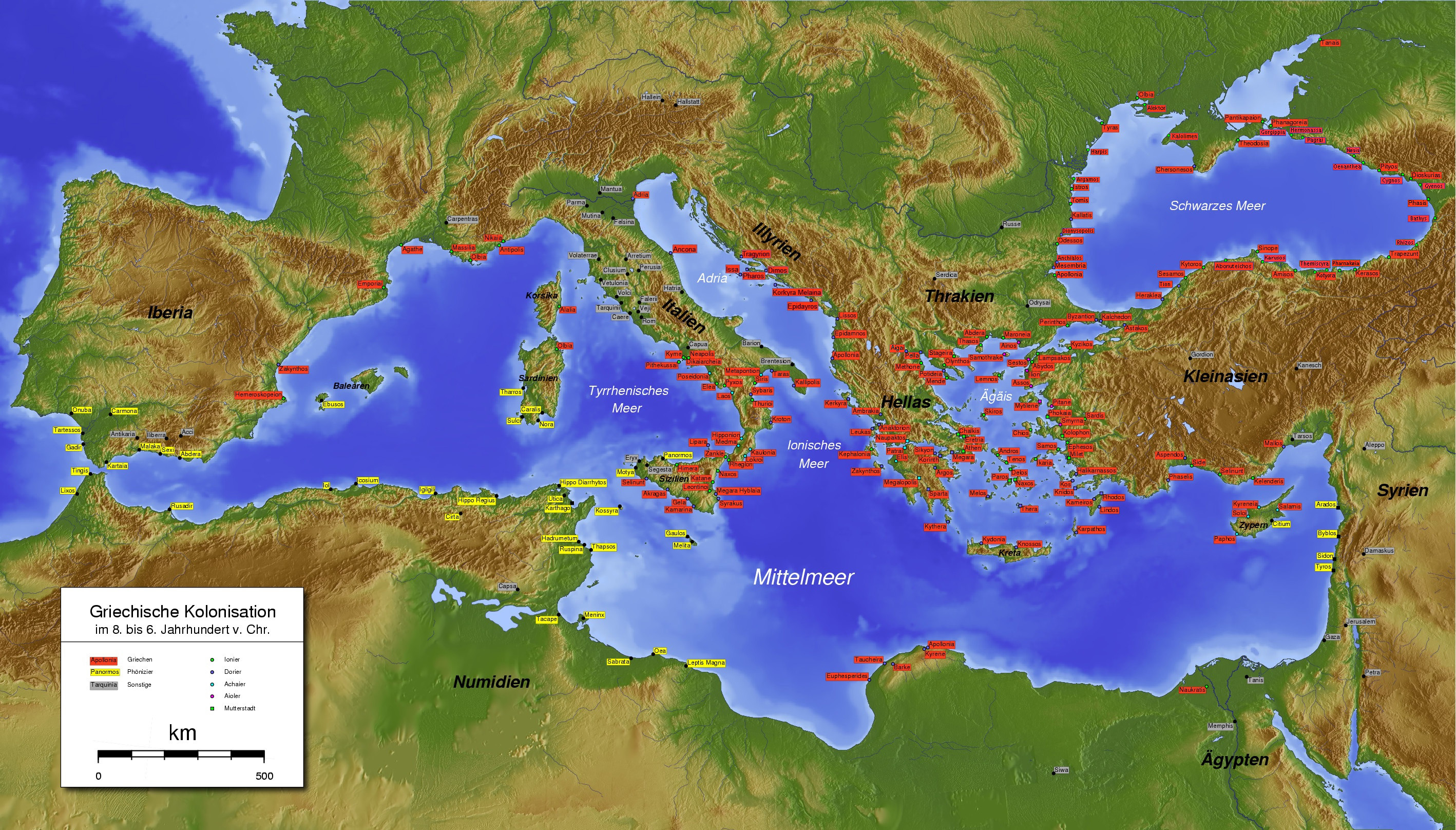
Phoenician and Greek colonies about 350 BC

Macedonian Greek king, Alexander the Great conquered Syria and the region in 333–332 BCE. Afterwards, Seleucus led the Seleucid Empire to rule Syria, which lasted until 64 BCE. In Syria, Seleucids had many achievements such as building cities like Antioch, Laodicea, and Apamea, in addition to laying the foundations to the Aleppo Citadel.

Late on, the Byzantine Empire kept the Greek influence until mid-7th century, in which they developed the Norias of Hama. During the Byzantine rule, the Eastern Orthodox Church was the common religion between the two nations, which still has 503,000 members in Syria.

=== Pre-WWI ===
Both Greece and Syria were occupied by the Ottoman Empire for more than four centuries.

=== Modern era ===
During the WWII, many Greeks fled their country after the Nazi invasion, mainly from the island of Chios to seek refuge in Al-Nayrab camp, near Aleppo. During the Syrian Civil War, thousands of Syrians went to Greece and Europe to escape war in their country.

On 8 May 2020, the Greek Foreign Ministry Nikos Dendias announced a restoration of relations between Greece and Syria and assigned former ambassador to Syria and Russia, Tasia Athanassiou, as a Special Envoy of Greece's Foreign Ministry for Syria.

In July 2020, Syria initiated the construction of a Russian-funded replica of Hagia Sophia in the predominantly Christian town of Al-Suqaylabiyah.

==== Operation Spring Shield ====
After ending of Syrian offensive against Turkish occupation and Balyun airstrike, Turkey asked NATO for help to launch a large-scale military intervention in Syria, but Greece vetoed Turkey's aid, thereby protecting Syria from NATO.

==== Restoration of diplomatic relations ====
In June 2021, Greece reopened its embassy in Damascus, following the withdrawal of its diplomatic mission from Syria in 2012. In April 2024, Greece, Romania, Cyprus, and Italy, expressed their intention to re-establish contact and collaboration with the Syrian government.

=== Post-Assad relations ===
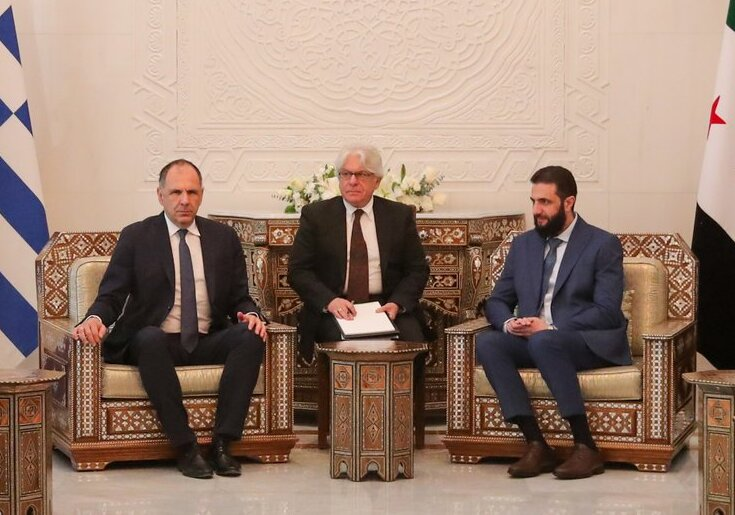
Syrian President Ahmed al-Sharaa met with a Greek delegation led by Foreign Minister Giorgos Gerapetritis in Syria on 9 February 2025

In December 2024, following the fall of the Assad regime, Greece suspended asylum applications for about 9,000 Syrians. On 9 February 2025, Syrian President Ahmed al-Sharaa met in Damascus with a high-ranking Greek delegation led by Foreign Minister Giorgos Gerapetritis. During the meeting, Gerapetritis stated, "We discussed Syria’s new institutions following the fall of Assad’s authoritarian regime."

== See also ==
- Foreign relations of Greece
- Foreign relations of Syria
- Greeks in Syria
- Syrians in Greece
