= Greeks in Syria =

Greek community in Syria

Έλληνες της Συρίας اليونانيون في سوريا

Total population
- 17,000

Regions with significant populations
- Damascus, Aleppo, Tartus, Latakia, Al-Hamidiyah

Languages
- Greek, Arabic

Religion
- Predominantly Greek Orthodox Christianity; minority Islam (Greek-speaking Cretans)

Related ethnic groups
- Other Greeks, especially Lebanese Greeks, Antiochian Greek Christians, Cretan Muslims

The Greeks in Syria arrived in the 7th century BC and became more prominent during the Hellenistic period when the Seleucid Empire ruled the region. Today, there is a Greek community of about 4,500 in Syria, most of whom have Syrian nationality and who live mainly in Aleppo (the country's main trading and financial centre), Baniyas, Tartous, and Damascus, the capital. There are also about 8,000 Greek-speaking Muslims of Cretan origin in Al-Hamidiyah.

== History ==
Greek presence is attested from early on, and in fact, the name of Syria itself is from a Greek word for Assyria.

=== Iron Age ===
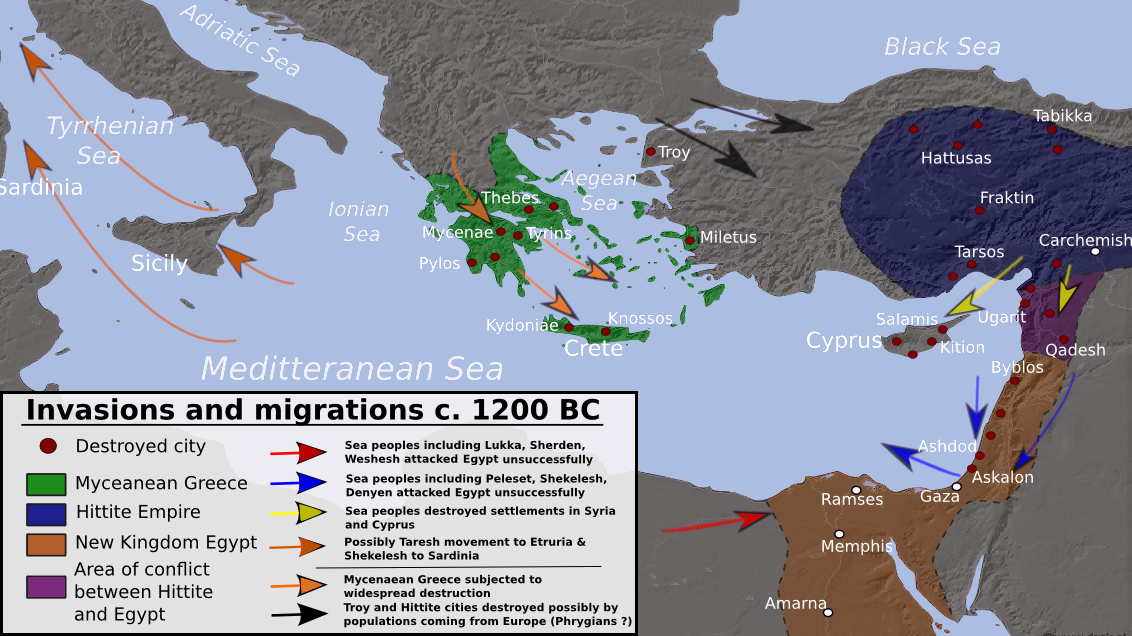
Invasions, population movements and destruction during the collapse of the Bronze Age, c. 1200 BCE

The Ancient Levant had been initially dominated by a number of indigenous Semitic speaking peoples; the Canaanites, the Amorites and Assyrians, in addition to Indo-European powers; the Luwians, Mitanni and the Hittites. However, during the collapse of the Late Bronze Age, the coastal regions came under attack from a collection of nine seafaring tribes known as the Sea Peoples. The transitional period is believed by historians to have been a violent, sudden and culturally disruptive time. During this period, the Eastern Mediterranean saw the fall of the Mycenaean Kingdoms, the Hittite Empire in Anatolia and Syria, and the New Kingdom of Egypt in Syria and Canaan.

Among the Sea Peoples were the first ethnic Greeks to migrate to the Levant. At least three of the nine tribes of the Sea Peoples are believed to have been ethnic Greeks; the Denyen, Ekwesh, and the Peleset, although some also include the Tjeker. According to scholars, the Peleset were allowed to settle the coastal strip from Gaza to Joppa becoming the Philistines. While the Denyen settled from Joppa to Acre, and the Tjeker in Acre. The political vacuum, which resulted from the collapse of the Hittite and Egyptian Empire's saw the rise of the Syro-Hittite states, the Philistine, and Phoenician Civilizations, and eventually the Neo-Assyrian Empire.

Al-Mina was a Greek trading colony.

=== Hellenistic Age ===
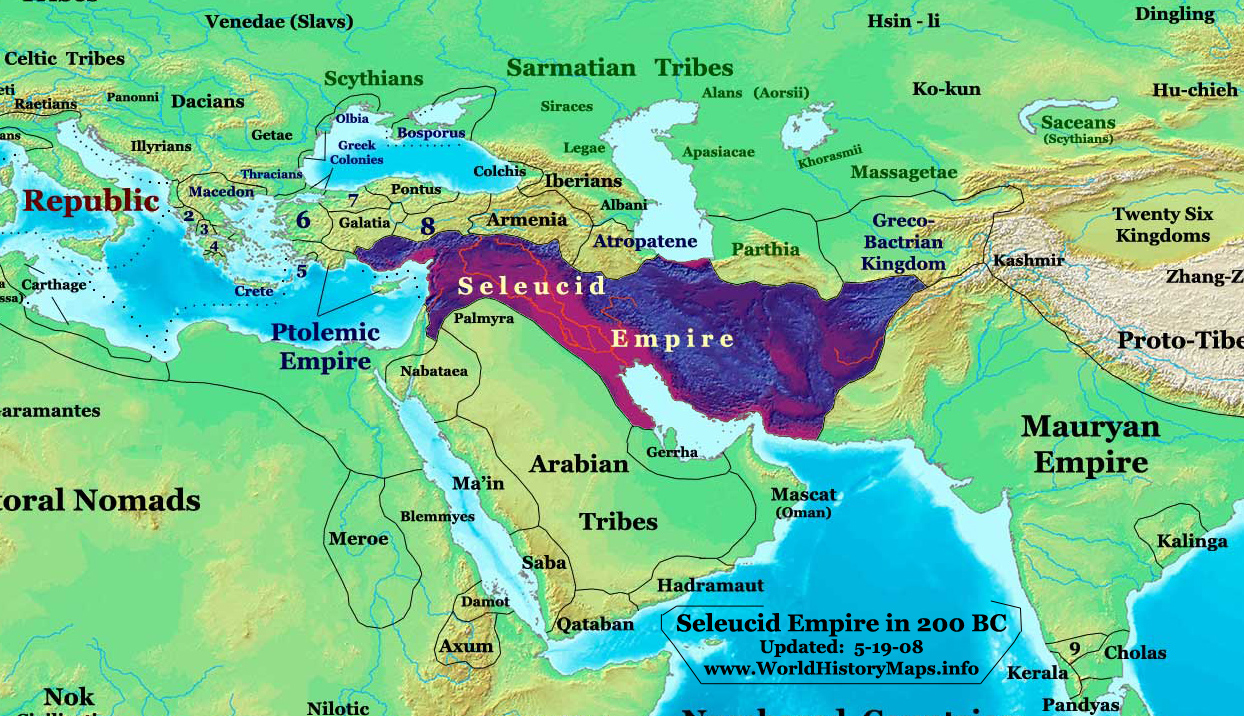
The Seleucid Empire in 200 BC (before expansion into western Anatolia and Greece)

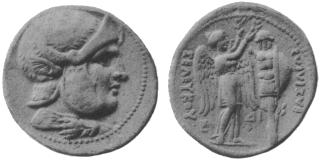
Silver coin of Seleucus. Greek inscription reads ΒΑΣΙΛΕΩΣ ΣΕΛΕΥΚΟΥ (king Seleucus')

The history of Greeks in Syria traditionally begins with Alexander the Great's conquest of the Persian Empire. In the aftermath of Alexander's death, his empire was divided into several successor states, and thus ushering in the beginning of the Hellenistic Age. For the Levant and Mesopotamia, it meant coming under the control of Seleucus I Nicator and the Seleucid Empire. The Hellenistic period was characterized by a new wave of Greek colonization. Ethnic Greek colonists came from all parts of the Greek world, not, as before, from a specific "mother city". The main centers of this new cultural expansion of Hellenism in the Levant were cities like the later Seleucid capital Antioch, and the other cities of the Tetrapolis Seleukis. The mixture of Greek-speakers gave birth to an Attic-Ionic based dialect, known as Koine Greek, which became the lingua franca throughout the Hellenistic world.

The Seleucid Empire was a major empire of Hellenistic culture that maintained the pre-eminence of Greek customs in which a Greek political elite dominated, in newly founded urban areas. The Greek population of the cities who formed the dominant elite were reinforced by emigration from Greece. The creation of new Greek cities were aided by the fact that the Greek mainland was overpopulated and therefore made the vast Seleucid Empire ripe for colonization. Apart from these cities, there were also a large number of Seleucid garrisons (choria), military colonies (katoikias) and Greek villages (komai) which the Seleucids planted throughout the empire to cement their rule.

=== Roman Era ===
Levantine Hellenism flourished under Roman rule in several regions, such as the Decapolis. Antiochians in the Northern Levant found themselves under Roman rule when Seleukeia was eventually annexed by the Roman Republic in 64 BC, by Pompey in the Third Mithridatic War. While those in the Southern Levant were absorbed gradually into the Roman State. Eventually, in 135 AD, after the Bar Kokhba revolt the North and South were merged into the Roman province of Syria Palaestina, which existed until about 390. During its existence, the population of Syria Palaestina in the north consisted of a mixed Polytheistic population of Phoenicians, Arameans and Jews which formed the majority, as well as what remained of Greek colonists, Arab societies of Itureans, and later also the Ghassanids. In the East, Arameans and Assyrians made up the majority. In the South, Samaritans, Nabateans and Greco-Romans made up the majority near the end of the 2nd century.

=== Byzantine Era ===
The flag used by the Greek Orthodox Church

Throughout the Middle Ages, Byzantines self-identified as Romaioi or Romioi (Greek: Ῥωμαῖοι, Ρωμιοί, meaning "Romans") and Graikoi (Γραικοῖ, meaning "Greeks"). Linguistically, they spoke Byzantine or Medieval Greek, known as "Romaic" which is situated between the Hellenistic (Koine), and modern phases of the language. Byzantines, perceived themselves as the descendants of classical Greece, the political heirs of imperial Rome, and followers of the Apostles. Thus, their sense of "Romanity" was different from that of their contemporaries in the West. "Romaic" was the name of the vulgar Greek language, as opposed to "Hellenic" which was its literary or doctrinal form.

The Byzantine dominion in the Levant known as the Diocese of the East, was one of the major commercial, agricultural, religious, and intellectual areas of the Empire, and its strategic location facing the Sassanid Empire and the unruly desert tribes gave it exceptional military importance. The entire area of the former diocese came under Sassanid occupation between 609 and 628, but it was retaken by the Emperor Heraclius until its irreversible lost to the Arabs after the Battle of Yarmouk and the fall of Antioch.

=== Arab Conquest ===
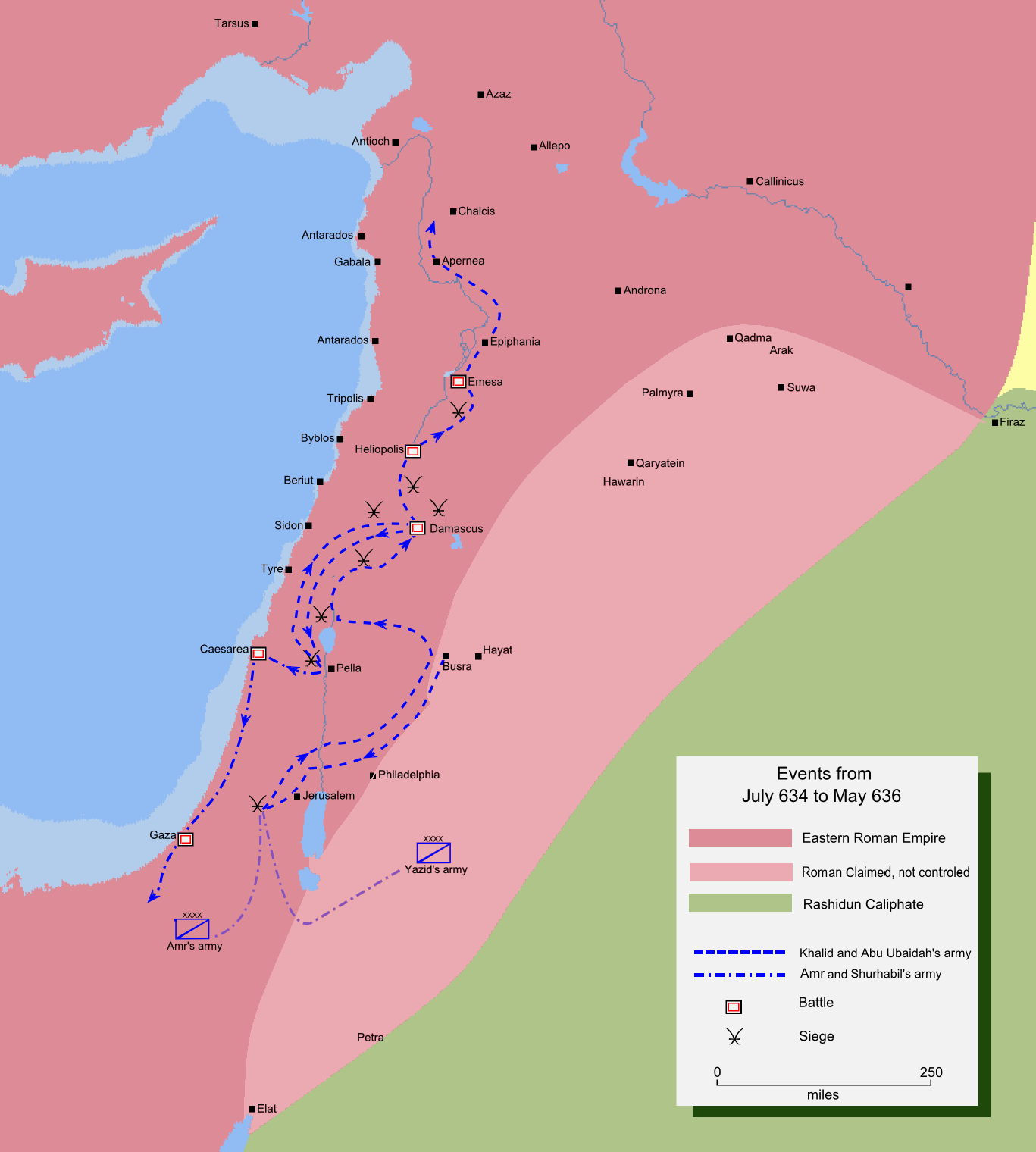
Map detailing the route of Muslim invasion of central Syria

The Arab conquest of Syria (Arabic: الفتح الإسلامي لبلاد الشام) occurred in the first half of the 7th century, and refers to the conquest of the Levant, which later became known as the Islamic Province of Bilad al-Sham. On the eve of the Arab Muslim conquests the Byzantines were still in the process of rebuilding their authority in the Levant, which had been lost to them for almost twenty years. At the time of the Arab conquest, Bilad al-Sham was inhabited mainly by local Aramaic-speaking Christians, Ghassanid and Nabatean Arabs, as well as Greeks, and by non-Christian minorities of Jews, Samaritans, and Itureans. The population of the region did not become predominantly Muslim and Arab in identity until nearly a millennium after the conquest.

==== In Southern Levant ====
In the Southern Levant, the Muslim Arab army approached Jerusalem in late 636 following the Byzantine defeat at Yarmouk. The city was besieged for several months. According to early Christian and Muslim sources, the Patriarch Sophronius agreed to surrender Jerusalem only to Caliph Umar, who traveled from Medina and received the capitulation in 637 or 638. The agreement connected to this event, commonly referred to as the Covenant of Umar in later texts, outlined the position of the Christian population, guaranteeing protection and continued religious practice in return for payment of the jizya tax.

At the time of the Arab conquest, Jerusalem’s population was mainly Christian, including Greek and local Christian communities. In the wider region of Palestine, scholarly research shows that the population in the 6th and 7th centuries was predominantly Christian, with Jewish and Samaritan minorities. While some modern claims state that Jews formed a majority of the population of Palestine at the time of the Arab conquest, or that they numbered between 300,000 and 400,000, historians note that there is no evidence supporting this. Modern scholarship consistently indicates that the population of Palestine in the 6th and 7th centuries was predominantly Christian, with Jewish and Samaritan minorities.

Following the conquest, the region experienced a gradual process of Arabization and Islamization. Cultural change in Palestine unfolded slowly rather than through abrupt replacement. Arab military settlers and tribal groups established garrisons and administrative centers, which introduced Arabic language and customs into local society. Under the Umayyads, Arabic became the official administrative language, replacing Greek and Syriac in government use. These changes helped spread Arabic among the local population. Conversion to Islam remained gradual, influenced by administrative opportunities, intermarriage, and social integration rather than coercion. Christian and Jewish communities continued to exist throughout the early Islamic period, and the region’s demographic and cultural transformation took shape over several generations.

== Present situation ==
Damascus has been home to an organized Greek community since 1913, but there are also significant numbers of Greek Muslims originally from Ottoman Crete who have been living in several coastal towns and villages of Syria and Lebanon since the late Ottoman era. They were resettled there by Sultan Abdul Hamid II following the Greco-Turkish War in 1897–98, in which the Ottoman Empire lost Crete to the Kingdom of Greece. The most notable but still understudied Cretan Muslim village in Syria is al-Hamidiyah, many of whose inhabitants continue to speak Greek as their first language. There, of course, is also a significant Greco-Syrian population in Aleppo as well as smaller communities in Latakia, Tartus and Homs.

There are about 8,000 Greek-speaking Muslims of Cretan origin in Al-Hamidiyah, Syria. Greek Muslims constitute a majority of Al-Hamidiyah's population. By 1988, many Greek Muslims from both Lebanon and Syria had reported being subject to discrimination by the Greek embassy because of their religious affiliation. The community members would be regarded with indifference and even hostility and would be denied visas and opportunities to improve their Greek through trips to Greece.

Because of the Syrian Civil War, many Muslim Greeks sought refuge in nearby Cyprus and even some went to their original homeland of Crete, yet they are still considered as foreigners.

== See also ==
- Greece–Syria relations
- Greek diaspora
- Ethnic groups in Syria
- Syrians in Greece
- Antiochian Greek Christians
- Greeks in Armenia
- Greeks in Israel
- Greeks in Lebanon
- Greeks in Turkey
