= Lebanese Cypriots =

Lebanese people in Cyprus
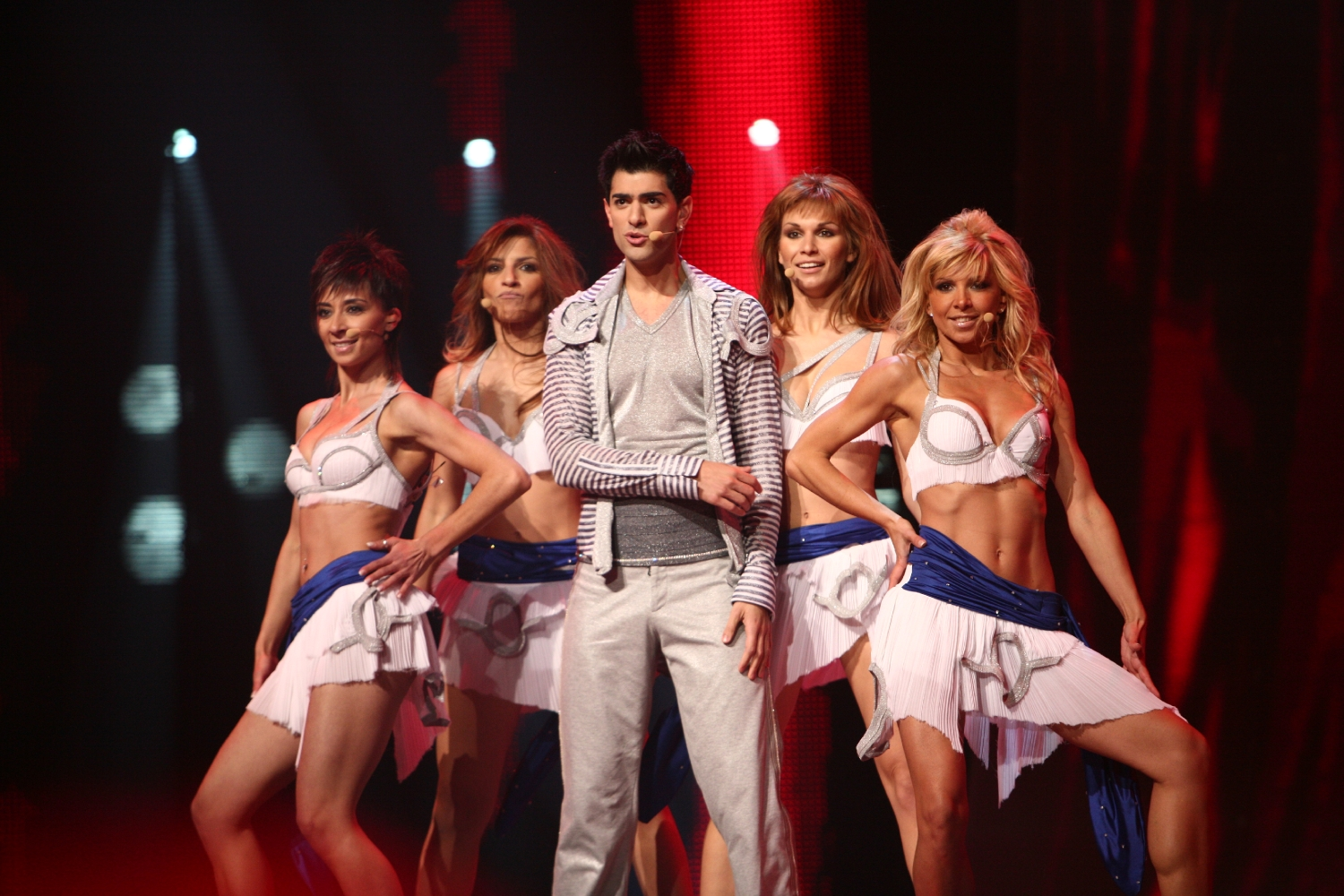
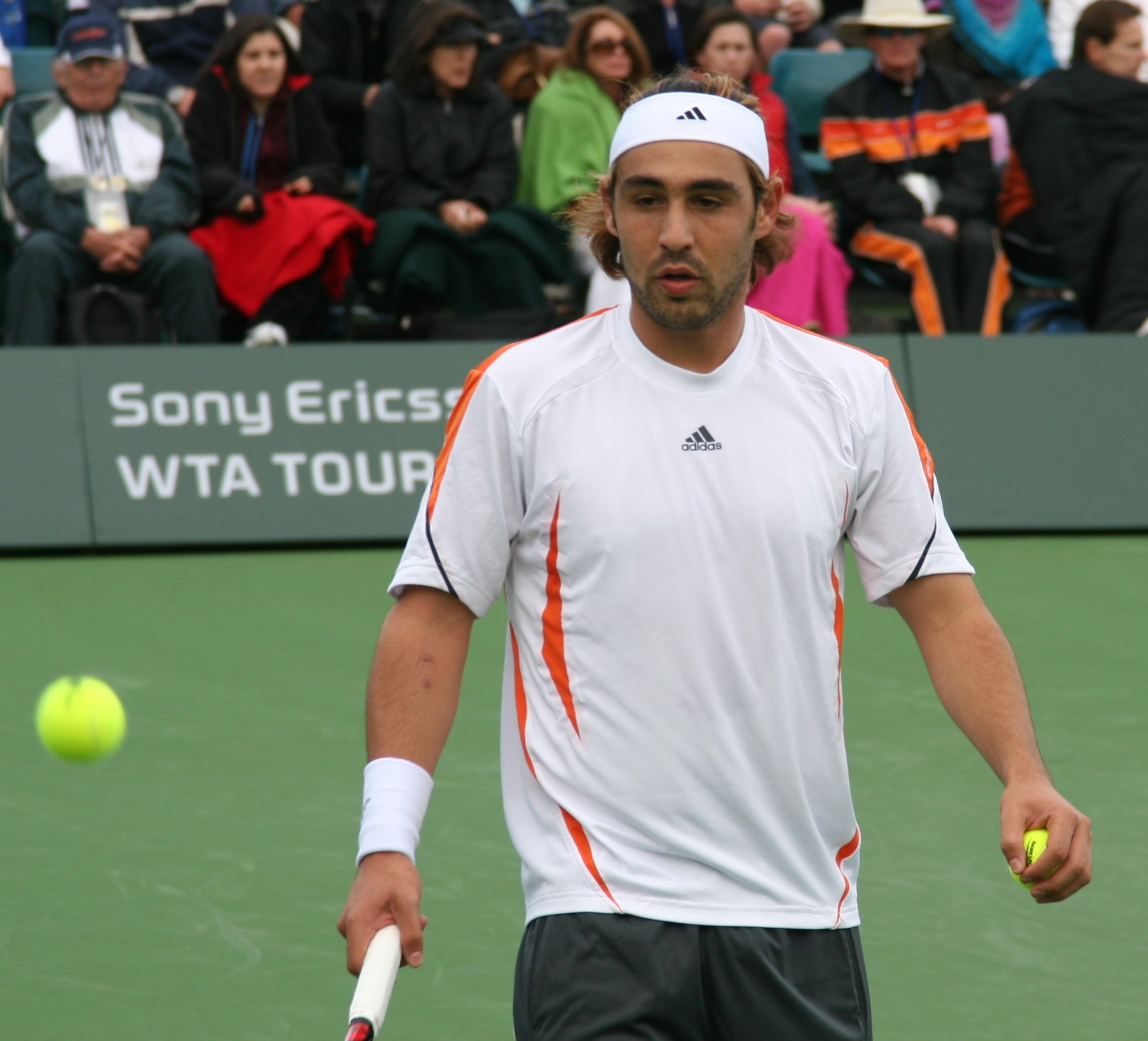
- , Notable Greek Cypriots of Lebanese origin: Sarbel, Marcos Baghdatis

Total population
- 20,000 people (by descent)

Regions with significant populations
- Nicosia, Limasol

Languages
- Arabic language (Including Cypriot Arabic) and Greek language

Religion
- Greek Orthodox, Maronite, Melkite, Shia, Sunni

Related ethnic groups
- Lebanese people in Greece, Arabs in Greece

Lebanese Cypriots include immigrants and descendants of immigrants from Lebanon, numbering approximately 20,000 people of Lebanese descent.

== History ==
Migration from Lebanon started after 1975 during the Lebanese Civil War. Most of the Lebanese from the new migration wave came from Koura District in North Lebanon, which is mostly a Greek Orthodox area. After the Civil War, many Lebanese nationals in Cyprus returned to Lebanon.

In the 2020s, economic instability in Lebanon led to increased emigration to Cyprus. Approximately 12,000 Lebanese citizens immigrated to Cyprus in 2021.

== Notable people ==
- Marcos Baghdatis, Cypriot tennis player, Lebanese father and Greek Cypriot mother
- Sarbel, British singer, Greek Cypriot father and Lebanese mother

== See also ==
- Cyprus–Lebanon relations
- List of Lebanese people in Cyprus
- Lebanese people in Greece, ca. 30,000 people
- Maronites in Cyprus
- Our Lady of Grace Cathedral, Nicosia
- Arabs in Greece
- Greeks in Lebanon
