= Demographics of Syria =

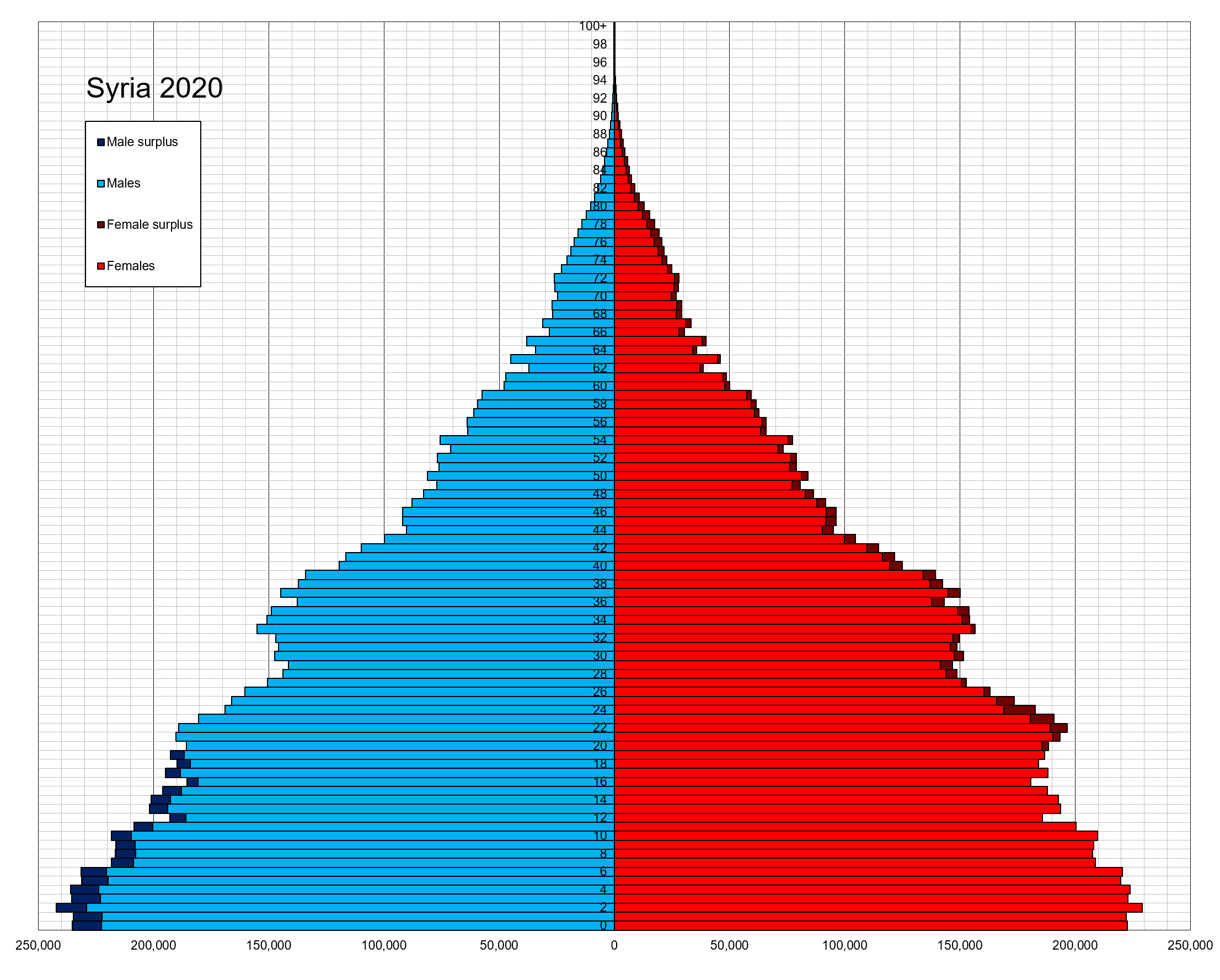
- Population pyramid of Syria in 2020
- Population: 25,255,139 (2025 est.)
- Density: 140/km^{2} (360/sq mi) (2024 est.)
- Growth rate: 4.57% (2024 est.)
- Birth rate: 21.7 births/1,000 population (2024 est.)
- Death rate: 4 deaths/1,000 population (2024 est.)
- Life expectancy: 74.8 years (2024 est.)
  - male: 73.4 years
  - female: 76.4 years
- Fertility rate: 2.69 children born/woman (2024 est.)
- Infant mortality: 15.1 deaths/1,000 live births (2024 est.)
- Net migration rate: −1.1 migrant(s)/1,000 population (2024 est.)
- Immigrant share: 3.6% (2024)

Age structure
- 0–14 years: 33% (male 4,037,493/female 3,828,777)
- 15–64 years: 62.8% (male 7,475,355/female 7,522,797)
- 65 and over: 4.2% (2024 est.) (male 468,730/female 532,271)

Sex ratio
- Total: 1.01 male(s)/female (2024 est.)
- At birth: 1.06 male(s)/female
- Under 15: 1.05 male(s)/female
- 15–64 years: 0.99 male(s)/female
- 65 and over: 0.88 male(s)/female

Nationality
- Nationality: noun: Syrian(s) adjective: Syrian
- Major ethnic: Arabs; Arab Muslims; Alawites; Others; Arab Christians; Maronites; Others; Other Arabs
- Minor ethnic: Kurds; Yazidis; Other Kurds; Turks; Druze; Assyrians; Doms; Circassians; Armenians; Blacks; Chechens; Greeks; Other groups

Language
- Official: Arabic
- Spoken: Kurdish, Turkish, Neo-Aramaic (Turoyo, Western Neo-Aramaic, Sureth)

Syria's estimated pre–Syrian Civil War 2011 population was 22 ±.5 million permanent inhabitants, which included 21,124,000 Syrians, as well as 1.3 million Iraqi refugees and over 500,000 Palestinian refugees. The war makes an accurate count of the Syrian population difficult, as the numbers of Syrian refugees, internally displaced Syrians and casualty numbers are in flux. The CIA World Factbook showed an estimated 20.4 m people as of July 2021. Of the pre-war population, six million are refugees outside the country, seven million are internally displaced and two million live in the Kurdish-ruled Autonomous Administration of North and East Syria.

Most modern-day Syrians are commonly described as Arabs by virtue of their modern-day language and bonds to Arab culture and history. But they are, in fact, genetically a blend of the various Semitic-speaking groups indigenous to the region. With around 10% of the population, Kurds are the second biggest ethnic group in Syria, followed by Turkmen.

== Population ==
This data is from CIA World Factbook: In 2023, the Syrian population increased by 6.39%. This made Syria the country with the highest population growth. The birth rate was estimated at 22.19 births per 1000 people. The death rate is 4.07 deaths for 1000 people. The median age (estimated in 2020) for males is 23 years old, while for females, it is 24 years old. Overall, the Syrian median age is 23.5 years old. The migration rate is 45.78 migrants for 1,000 people.

Historical population
Year	Pop.	±% p.a.
0	2,110,000	—
200	2,860,000	+0.15%
500	2,430,000	−0.05%
900	2,200,000	−0.02%
1200	2,700,000	+0.07%
1500	1,070,000	−0.31%
1700	1,250,000	+0.08%
1850	1,480,000	+0.11%
1900	1,720,000	+0.30%
1937	2,368,000	+0.87%
1950	3,252,000	+2.47%
1960	4,565,000	+3.45%
1970	6,305,000	+3.28%
1980	8,704,000	+3.28%
1990	12,116,000	+3.36%
1995	14,186,000	+3.20%
2004	17,921,000	+2.63%
2011	21,124,000	+2.38%
2016	17,185,000	−4.04%
2023	23,022,427	+4.27%
Source: 2016 estimate 2023 estimate

Population history of Syria

In 1200, the territories of modern-day Syria had an estimated population of 2.7 million. This number sharply decreased due to the Plague epidemic in 1348–1353, which killed off an estimated third of the Levant's population. By 1937, the population reached an estimated 2,368,000, still considerably lower than 1200's estimated population.

Since 1960, censuses have been conducted in 1960, 1970, 1981, 1994, and 2004.

In 2017, the head of the Syrian Commission for Family Affairs, Mohammad Akram al-Qash, said that the Syrian population was 28 million, of which, 21 million were living in Syria and that 7 million were refugees. In 2018, the population was estimated to be 19,454,263 people. Ever since the Syrian Civil War, the population has been steadily declining, however rebounded in 2023, with an estimated population of 23,022,427 people.

=== Forced displacement ===
More than six million refugees left the country during the civil war, of whom over five million are registered as refugees by the UNHCR as of mid-2019. Most of them fled to neighboring countries such as Turkey, Lebanon, Jordan, and Iraq, as well as European nations like Greece, Germany and Sweden. Since 2017, tens of thousands have returned.

The war resulted in large-scale displacement in the country. The UNHCR estimates internally displaced people (IDPs) at seven million. A further 70,000 people were trapped on the border with Jordan at Rukban in 2016–18, with up to 40,000 still there in 2019.

A significant part of the population lives in territory outside government sovereignty. At its peak in 2015, ISIL ruled over ten million people across Syria and Iraq. The Autonomous Administration of North and East Syria (NES), commonly referred to as Rojava, has a population of around two million. Areas controlled by the opposition have had a population in the millions. In mid-2017, UN OCHA estimated that around 540,000 persons were trapped in besieged areas as of June 2017, the majority besieged by government forces in Eastern Ghouta. By the time the government retook Ghouta in April 2018, some 140,000 individuals had fled their homes and up to 50,000 were evacuated to Idlib and Aleppo governorates. The latter rebel areas had an estimated population of 3 million (40% of them displaced from defeated rebel areas). Fighting in Idlib has led to further displacements, of up to 250,000 people, and generating new refugee outflows to neighbouring Turkey.

Displacement has led to demographic shifts. One example is the area in the North under control by Kurdish-led and US-backed Syrian Democratic Forces (SDF). Many human rights groups, including Amnesty International and international organizations have accused SDF forces of committing ethnic cleansing in Arab areas they were capturing from other war factions. The accusation was repeated on 8 May 2019 by Russia's foreign minister Sergey Lavrov. NGOs and the opposition have also accused the government of using the conflict to affect demographic restructuring.

=== Casualties of the civil war ===
Human toll of the Syrian civil war
- Pre-war population 22 ±.5; Internally displaced 6 ±.5, Refugees 5.5 ±.5, Fatalities 0.5 ±.1 (millions)

Syrian refugees
- By country: Turkey, Lebanon, Egypt, Jordan
- Settlements: Camps: Jordan

Internally displaced Syrians

Casualties of the war
- Crimes: War crimes, massacres, rape

In April 2016, the UN estimated that 400,000 people had died in the war, and casualties have continued since, with estimates for the total dead by mid-2019 of up to 220,000 civilians, 175,000 government combatants, and 174,000 anti-government combatants (see Casualties of the Syrian Civil War).

=== Age structure ===
CIA World Factbook (2018 est.)
Population pyramid	Male	Female
0–14	3,132,619	2,974,394
15–24	1,933,185	1,863,991
25–54	3,807,664	3,829,150
55–64	531,455	542,738
65+	379,360	379,360

UN inc Palestinian refugees 2011-07-01 est.
Population pyramid	Male	Female
0–14	4,044,000	6,281,000
15–64	6,281,000	6,126,000
65+	469,000	389,000

(2011-07-01) (Estimates, including Palestinian refugees)
Age group	Male	Female	Total	%
Total	10,794,000	10,330,000	21,124,000	100
0–4	1,428,000	1,347,000	2,775,000	13.14
5–9	1,384,000	1,270,000	2,654,000	12.56
10–14	1,232,000	1,198,000	2,430,000	11.50
15–19	1,191,000	1,088,000	2,279,000	10.79
20–24	1,035,000	944,000	1,979,000	9.37
25–29	864,000	873,000	1,737,000	8.22
30–34	674,000	697,000	1,371,000	6.49
35–39	601,000	628,000	1,229,000	5.82
40–44	545,000	551,000	1,096,000	5.19
45–49	437,000	433,000	870,000	4.12
50–54	387,000	405,000	792,000	3.75
55–59	293,000	280,000	573,000	2.71
60–64	254,000	227,000	481,000	2.28
65+	469,000	389,000	858,000	4.06
Age group	Male	Female	Total	Percent
0–14	4,044,000	3,815,000	7,859,000	37.20
15–64	6,281,000	6,126,000	12,407,000	58.73
65+	469,000	389,000	858,000	4.06

=== Population centers ===
Population centers as of 2004 6,133,652 Syrians among 17,921,000 total population live in the first 10: (1) Aleppo 2,132,100 (2) Damascus 1,711,000 (3) Homs 652,609 (4) Latakia 383,786 (5) Hama 312,994 (6) Raqqa 220,488 (7) Deir ez-Zor 211,857 (8) Al-Hasakah 188,160 (9) Qamishli 184,231 (10) Sayyidah Zaynab 136,427

60% of the population lives in the Aleppo Governorate, the Euphrates valley or along the coastal plain; a fertile strip between the coastal mountains and the desert. Overall population density is about 118.3 inhabitants per square kilometre (306/sq mi).

==== Urbanization ====
This data is from CIA World Factbook: Urban population: 54.2% of total population (2018) Rate of urbanization: 1.43% annual rate of change (2015-20 est.)

==== Major urban areas ====
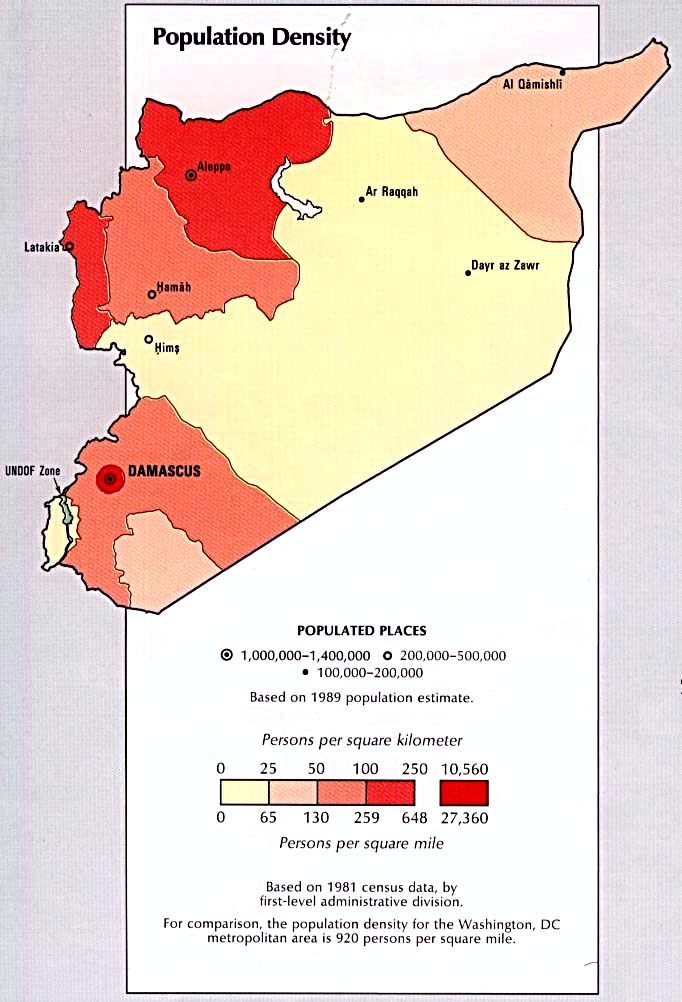
Population density, 1993

As of 2018; this data is from CIA World Factbook: Damascus (capital): 2.32 million Aleppo: 1.754 million Homs: 1.295 million Hama: 894,000

== Vital statistics ==
=== United Nations estimates ===
Notable events Syrian demographics:

- 1982 – 1982 Hama massacre
- 2006-2008 – Iraqi civil war
- 2006 – 2006 Lebanon war
- 2011-2024 – Syrian civil war

UN estimates:

Period	Population	Live births	Deaths	Natural change	Birth rate (per 1000)	Death rate (per 1000)	Natural change (per 1000)	Crude migration rate (per 1000)	Total Fertility rate	Infant mortality (1000 births)	Life expectancy (years)
1950	3,544,000	167,000	92,000	75,000	47.0	25.9	21.1		7.60	179.6	44.14
1951	3,621,000	171,000	92,000	80,000	47.3	25.4	22.0	-0.7	7.60	177.5	44.45
1952	3,703,000	176,000	91,000	85,000	47.6	24.7	23.0	-0.9	7.61	173.3	44.99
1953	3,791,000	182,000	90,000	91,000	47.9	23.9	24.0	-0.8	7.61	169.1	45.70
1954	3,886,000	187,000	88,000	99,000	48.0	22.6	25.5	-1.1	7.62	160.2	46.97
1955	3,989,000	192,000	85,000	107,000	48.2	21.3	26.8	-1.0	7.62	151.7	48.31
1956	4,099,000	197,000	83,000	114,000	48.0	20.3	27.7	-0.9	7.59	143.9	49.39
1957	4,217,000	202,000	81,000	121,000	47.8	19.1	28.7	-0,7	7.57	136.6	50.58
1958	4,341,000	207,000	79,000	128,000	47.6	18.2	29.4	-0.8	7.54	129.9	51.57
1959	4,473,000	212,000	77,000	135,000	47.3	17.2	30.1	-0.6	7.51	123.7	52.61
1960	4,611,000	217,000	75,000	142,000	47.0	16.3	30.7	-0.8	7.49	118.0	53.55
1961	4,752,000	221,000	74,000	147,000	46.5	15.5	31.0	-1.3	7.43	113.0	54.44
1962	4,895,000	227,000	73,000	154,000	46.4	14.8	31.5	-2.3	7.44	108.4	55.09
1963	5,045,000	233,000	72,000	162,000	46.2	14.2	32.0	-2.3	7.44	104.2	55.78
1964	5,203,000	241,000	71,000	170,000	46.2	13.6	32.6	-2.2	7.47	100.3	56.50
1965	5,368,000	249,000	70,000	179,000	46.3	13.1	33.3	-2.6	7.51	96.5	57.11
1966	5,542,000	258,000	70,000	188,000	46.5	12.6	33.8	-2.4	7.55	92.7	57.60
1967	5,723,000	267,000	70,000	197,000	46.6	12.2	34.4	-2.8	7.58	88.9	58.10
1968	5,913,000	276,000	68,000	208,000	46.6	11.5	35.1	-3.0	7.60	85.0	59.07
1969	6,111,000	288,000	67,000	220,000	47.0	11.0	36.0	-3.6	7.67	81.1	59.88
1970	6,319,000	298,000	67,000	231,000	47.1	10.5	36.5	-3.6	7.69	77.2	60.53
1971	6,539,000	305,000	65,000	240,000	46.7	10.0	36.7	-3.1	7.65	73.5	61.37
1972	6,769,000	314,000	65,000	249,000	46.3	9.6	36.7	-2.7	7.61	70.1	61.90
1973	7,003,000	322,000	69,000	253,000	45.9	9.8	36.1	-2.7	7.56	66.9	60.69
1974	7,245,000	331,000	63,000	267,000	45.6	8.7	36.9	-3.5	7.51	63.8	63.12
1975	7,497,000	341,000	63,000	278,000	45.4	8.4	37.0	-3.4	7.47	60.9	63.54
1976	7,759,000	352,000	63,000	289,000	45.3	8.1	37.2	-3.4	7.44	58.0	63.92
1977	8,029,000	364,000	65,000	299,000	45.2	8.1	37.2	-3.6	7.41	55.2	63.76
1978	8,310,000	373,000	60,000	314,000	44.8	7.2	37.7	-3.9	7.35	52.4	65.81
1979	8,601,000	382,000	60,000	322,000	44.3	6.9	37.4	-3.6	7.27	49.7	66.14
1980	8,899,000	390,000	60,000	330,000	43.8	6.7	37.1	-3.6	7.16	47.2	66.35
1981	9,204,000	396,000	68,000	328,000	43.0	7.4	35.6	-2.5	7.01	47.0	64.37
1982	9,511,000	404,000	83,000	321,000	42.4	8.7	33.7	-1.4	6.88	48.6	61.12
1983	9,835,000	413,000	58,000	355,000	41.9	5.9	36.0	-3.1	6.74	40.3	67.83
1984	10,183,000	422,000	55,000	366,000	41.4	5.4	35.9	-1.7	6.61	38.3	68.92
1985	10,541,000	432,000	57,000	375,000	41.0	5.4	35.5	-1.5	6.48	36.6	68.76
1986	10,908,000	441,000	57,000	384,000	40.4	5.2	35.2	-1.6	6.33	35.0	69.21
1987	11,281,000	447,000	58,000	389,000	39.6	5.1	34.5	-1.4	6.13	33.5	69.30
1988	11,658,000	448,000	58,000	390,000	38.4	4.9	33.4	-1.1	5.89	32.3	69.67
1989	12,034,000	446,000	58,000	388,000	37.1	4.9	32.2	-1.0	5.63	31.1	69.76
1990	12,409,000	446,000	59,000	387,000	35.9	4.8	31.1	-0.9	5.38	29.9	69.82
1991	12,782,000	444,000	60,000	384,000	34.7	4.7	30.0	-0.8	5.12	28.8	70.04
1992	13,156 000	448,000	60,000	387,000	34.0	4.6	29.4	-1.0	4.95	27.7	70.26
1993	13,537,000	459,000	62,000	397,000	33.9	4.6	29.3	-1.2	4.83	26.5	70.19
1994	13,923,000	468,000	64,000	404,000	33.6	4.6	29.0	-1.3	4.72	25.4	70.14
1995	14,313,000	474,000	64,000	409,000	33.1	4.5	28.6	-1.4	4.57	24.2	70.42
1996	14,709,000	478,000	67,000	411,000	32.5	4.5	28.0	-1.1	4.43	23.1	70.35
1997	15,104,000	481,000	69,000	412,000	31.8	4.5	27.3	-1.1	4.28	22.0	70.28
1998	15,501,000	487,000	71,000	416,000	31.4	4.6	26.8	-1.2	4.18	21.0	70.20
1999	15,901,000	493,000	72,000	421,000	31.0	4.5	26.5	-1.3	4.08	20.1	70.43
2000	16,308,000	500,000	72,000	428,000	30.6	4.4	26.2	-1.2	4.00	19.3	70.76
2001	16,728,000	519,000	70,000	449,000	31.0	4.2	26.8	-1.7	4.01	18.6	71.64
2002	17,164,000	529,000	70,000	459,000	30.8	4.1	26.7	-1.3	3.95	18.0	71.94
2003	17,611,000	541,000	70,000	471,000	30.7	4.0	26.7	-1.3	3.90	17.4	72.41
2004	18,084,000	553,000	72,000	481,000	30.6	4.0	26.6	-0.4	3.86	17.0	72.48
2005	18,584,000	567,000	73,000	494,000	30.5	3.9	26.6	0.3	3.81	16.6	72.77
2006	19,432,000	579,000	72,000	507,000	30.3	3.8	26.5	17.1	3.76	16.3	73.35
2007	20,703,000	625,000	75,000	551,000	30.8	3.7	27.1	34.3	3.70	16.1	73.71
2008	21,474,000	673,000	81,000	592,000	31.0	3.7	27.3	8.6	3.61	16.0	73.55
2009	21,827,000	650,000	80,000	569,000	29.7	3.7	26.1	-9.9	3.51	15.9	73.85
2010	22,338,000	641,000	83,000	558,000	28.7	3.7	25.0	-2.1	3.40	15.9	73.88
2011	22,731,000	629,000	90,000	539,000	27.5	3.9	23.6	-2.1	3.28	16.4	73.31
2012	22,606,000	615,000	148,000	467,000	26.6	6.4	20.2	-6.3	3.22	23.0	66.77
2013	21,496,000	568,000	173,000	394,000	25.2	7.7	17.5	-25.7	3.16	26.3	63.83
2014	20,072,000	465,000	168,000	297,000	22.4	8.1	14.3	-69.1	3.12	27.1	63.15
2015	19,205,000	397,000	143,000	254,000	20.2	7.3	12.9	-85.2	3.07	25.1	65.12
2016	18,964,000	359,000	133,000	226,000	18.9	7.0	11.9	-24.6	3.01	24.5	65.99
2017	18,983,000	355,000	115,000	240,000	18.6	6.0	12.5	-11.5	2.97	18.5	68.48
2018	19,333,000	346,000	106,000	240,000	18.2	5.6	12.6	5.5	2.93	18.6	70.15
2019	20,098,000	375,000	100,000	275,000	18.9	5.0	13.9	24.2	2.88	18.1	71.82
2020	20,773,000	406,000	103,000	303,000	19.7	5.0	14.7	17.8	2.84	18.1	72.14
2021	21,324,000	427,000	109,000	318,000	21.2	5.1	15.0	10.8	2.80	17.8	72.06
2022					21.2				2.75		
2023					22.1				2.71		
2024					23.2				2.70		
2025					23.5				2.66		

View source data.
View source data.
View source data.
View source data.
View source data.

=== Fertility Rate ===
Years	1925	1926	1927	1928	1929	1930	1931	1932	1933	1934
Total Fertility Rate in Syria	6.85	6.87	6.88	6.89	6.90	6.92	6.93	6.94	6.96	6.97

Years	1935	1936	1937	1938	1939	1940	1941	1942	1943	1944
Total Fertility Rate in Syria	6.98	7.00	7.01	7.02	7.03	7.05	7.06	7.07	7.09	7.10

Years	1945	1946	1947	1948	1949
Total Fertility Rate in Syria	7.11	7.12	7.14	7.15	7.16

Fertility
Name	TFR (2009)
Aleppo	3.2
Damascus	2.6
Daraa	5.2
Deir ez-Zor	6.9
Hama	3.3
Al-Hasakah	3.5
Homs	3.1
Idlib	4.8
Latakia	2.2
Quneitra	3.8
Raqqa	5
Rif Dimashq	3.3
Al-Suwayda	2.1
Tartus	2.3
Syria	3.5

Life expectancy in Syria since 1950

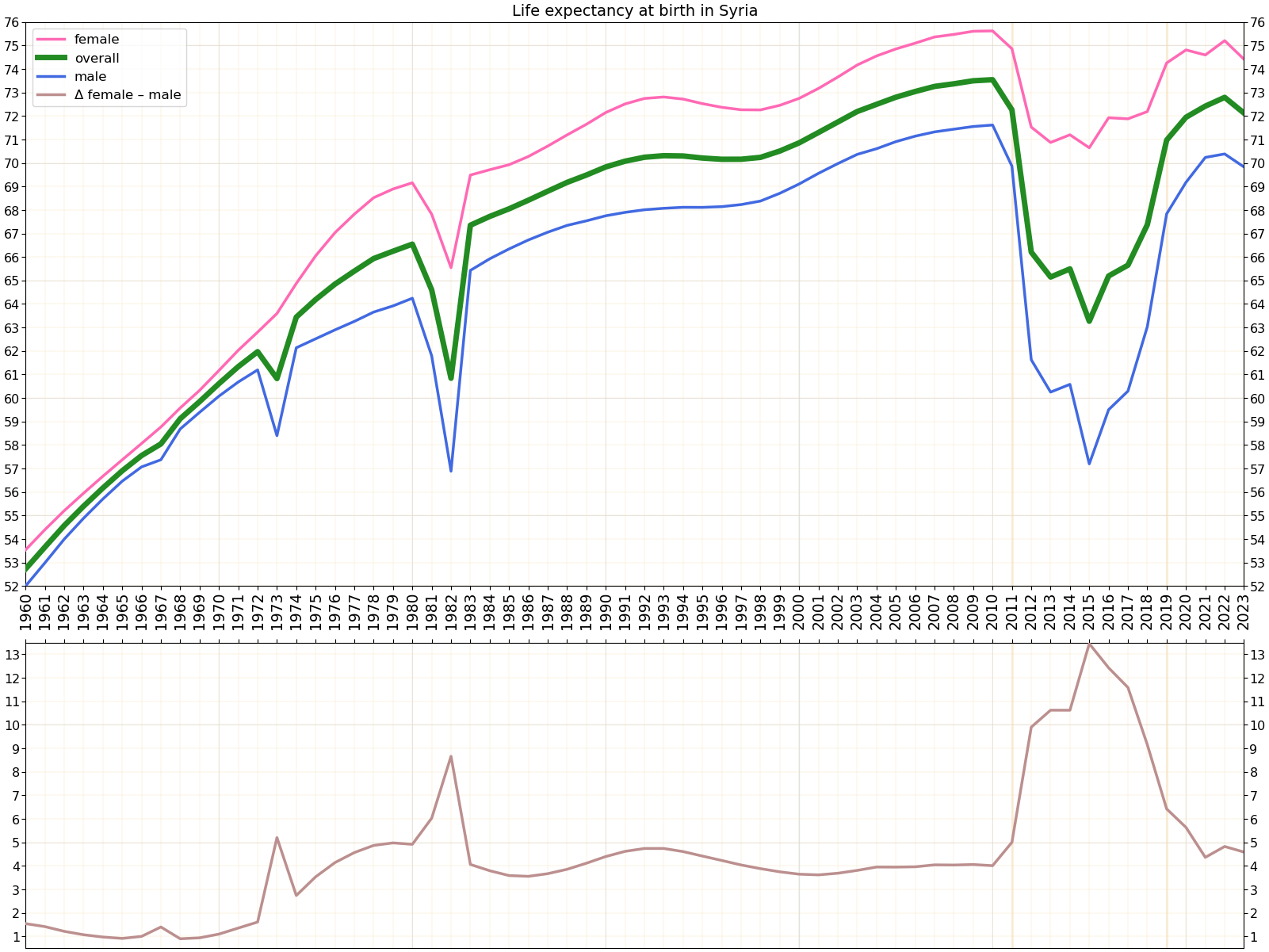
Life expectancy in Syria since 1960 by gender

Marital fertility rate
Name	MFR (2009)
Aleppo	5.4
Damascus	4.7
Daraa	7.3
Deir ez-Zor	10.2
Hama	6.6
Al-Hasakah	6.8
Homs	5.9
Idlib	7.7
Latakia	4.5
Quneitra	6.5
Raqqa	7.9
Rif Dimashq	5.4
Al-Suwayda	4
Tartus	4.8
Syria	6

Life expectancy at birth

This data is from CIA World Factbook:

total: 75.2 years
male: 72.8 years
female: 77.8 years (2018 est.)

== Ethnicity and religion ==
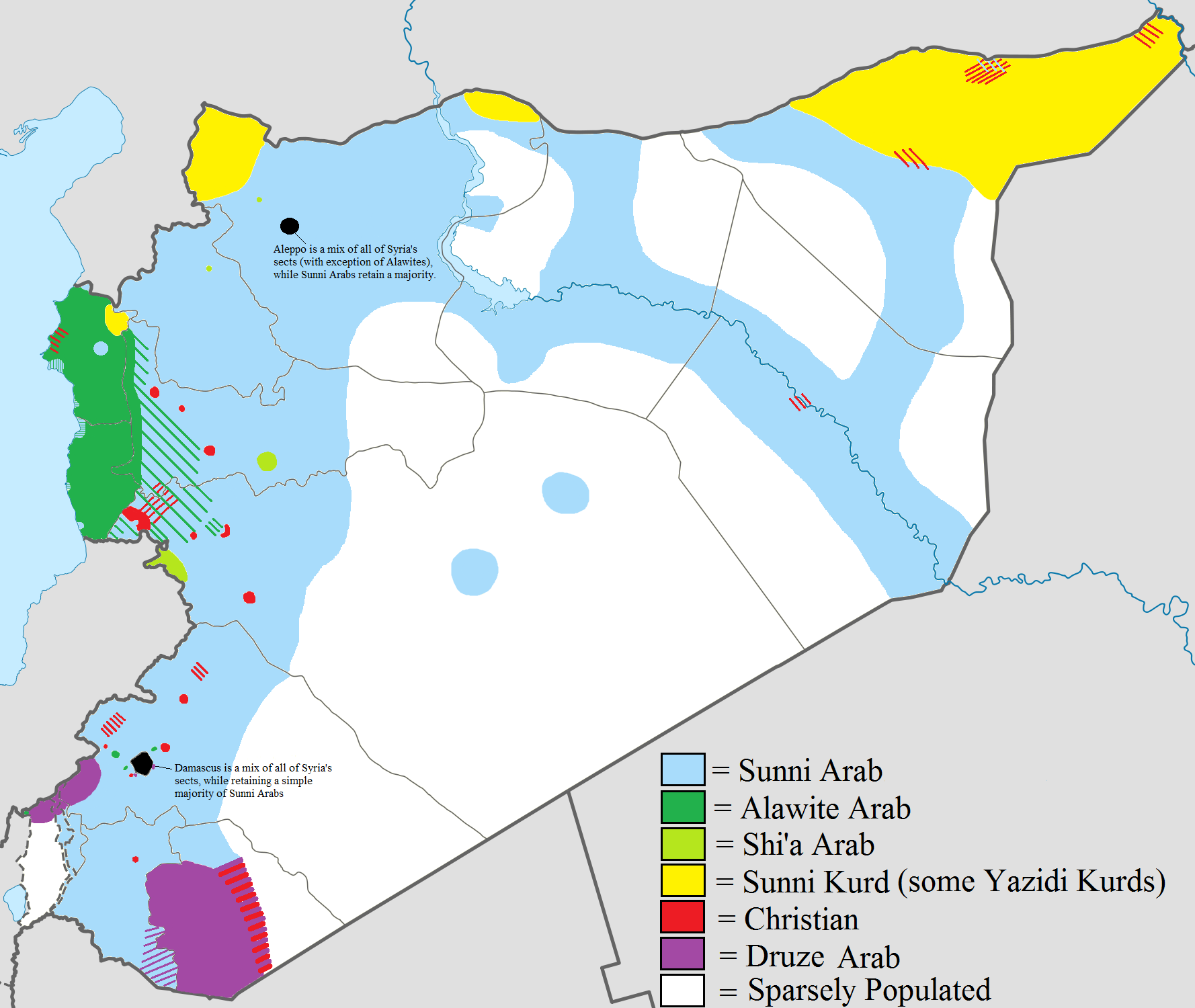
Ethnoreligious map of Syria. Sunni Arabs Alawite Arabs Shia Arabs Sunni Kurds (some Yazidi Kurds) Christians (Arabs, Assyrians, Armenians, Greeks, etc.) Druze Arabs Sparsely populated

On 1 January 2011, Syria was estimated to have a population of 24 million people, distributed over its 14 governorates. Arabs represent 80-85% of the population, with the rest being a mixture of many ethnic and religious sects, as shown in the table below:

Ethnic and religious groups	% of Syrian population	Notes
Syrian Arabs Qahtanite - Adnanites	80%	The Arabs form the majority in all districts except for the Al-Hasakah Governorate.
Kurds	10%	The majority of Kurds are Sunni Muslims, with a Yazidi minority; concentrated in Syrian Kurdistan region and major urban centres outside that region. 1.5 million Kurds live in Syria.
Turkmens	4%	Descendants of ethnic Turks, rather than Turkmens. These figures exclude the Arabic-speaking Turks. Only approximately 30% of Turkmen speak a Turkic language. The majority are Sunni Muslims.
Assyrians/Syriacs	3%	Assyrians are exclusively Christians following the Syriac Christian Rite.
Circassians	1%	The majority of Circassians are Sunni Muslims originally from Circassia.
Armenians	1%	The majority of Armenians are Christians.
Smaller groups of Albanians, Greeks and Chechens, among others	<1% (combined)	A significant number of these ethnic groups are Arabized, particularly those that adhere to Islam.

The CIA World Factbook cites the following figures for ethnic groups as in July 2018: approximately Arab 50%, Alawite 15%, Kurd 10%, Levantine 10%, other 15% (includes Druze, Ismaili, Imami, Nusairi, Assyrians, Turkmen, Armenian, and Chechens). Professor John A. Shoup estimated in 2018 that Kurds made 9% of the population, followed by Turkish-speaking Turkmen comprising 4-5%, Assyrians 4%, Armenians 2%, and Circassians about 1% of the total population.

Religion in Syria (est. 2021)
1. Sunni Islam (74.0%)
2. Shia (Alawites, Ismailis, Twelvers) (13.0%)
3. Christianity (10.0%)
4. Druze (3.00%)

There has been no Syrian census including a question about religion since 1960, these are thus the last official statistics available:

In 1991, Professor Alasdair Drysdale and Professor Raymond Hinnebusch said that some 85% of Syrians were Muslims and that the remainder were almost all Christians, however, both religious groups were subdivided into many ethnic sects. Among the former, approximately 75% of Syrians were Sunni Muslim, of whom, 60% were Arabic-speaking and the remainder of Sunnis included Kurds 8.5%, Turkmens 3%, and Circassians (less than 1%). In addition, Alawis formed 5.5%, Druze 3%, and Ismailis 1.5% of the population. In regards to the Christians, they were subdivided into the Greek Orthodox 4.7%, Armenians 4%, and Assyrians 1%.

According to Pierre Beckouche, before 2011, Sunni Muslims accounted for 78% of Syria's population, which included 500,000 Palestinian refugees and the non-Arab Sunni Muslims, namely the Kurds 9-10% and the Turkmens 4%. Other Muslims included Shias and Alawites 11%-16%, whilst the Christians made up 6% of the population. There were also a few Jewish communities in Aleppo and Damascus.

The CIA World Factbook cites the following figures for religious groups: religions - Muslim 87% (official; includes Sunni 74% and Alawi, Ismaili, and Shia 13%), Christian 10% (mainly of the Greek Orthodox and Greek Catholic churches - may be smaller as a result of Christians fleeing the country), Druze 3%.

The first census which focused on the sectarian distribution was carried out in 1932 under the French mandate, however, this census was only carried out in the lands under the short-lived Government of Latakia (the Alawite State established by the French) which covered only 7,000 km^{2} (2,700 sq mi) out of modern Syria's total area of 185,000 km^{2} (71,000 sq mi). A general census of Syria in 1943 gave details of religious groups of the population and the rate of growth of each and estimates of the population in 1953 from an unnamed source were as follows:

	1943 census	1953 census	Growth
Total Muslims	2,427,605 (84.87%)	3,145,287 (86.03%)	30%
Individual sects and religions
Sunnis	1,971,053 (68.91%)	2,578,810 (70.54%)	31%
Christians	403,036 (14.09%)	478,970 (13.10%)	19%
Alawites	325,311 (11.37%)	398,445 (10.90%)	22%
Druze	87,184 (3.05%)	113,318 (3.10%)	30%
Ismailis	28,527 (1.00%)	36,745 (1.01%)	29%
Jews	29,770 (1.04%)	31,647 (0.87%)	6%
Shi'ites	12,742 (0.45%)	14,887 (0.41%)	17%
Yezidi	2,788 (0.10%)	3,082 (0.08%)	11%

== Languages ==
Arabic is the official, and most widely spoken, language. Arabic speakers make up 85% of the population. Several modern Arabic dialects are used in everyday life, most notably Levantine in the west and Mesopotamian in the northeast. A report published by the UNHCR points out that "while the majority of Syrians are considered Arabs, this is a term based on spoken language (Arabic), not ethnicity."

According to The Encyclopedia of Arabic Language and Linguistics, in addition to Arabic, the following languages are spoken in the country, in order of the number of speakers: Kurdish, Turkish, Neo-Aramaic (four dialects), Circassian, Chechen, Armenian, and finally Greek. None of these languages have official status.

Many educated Syrians also speak English and French.
