= Greece–Lebanon relations =

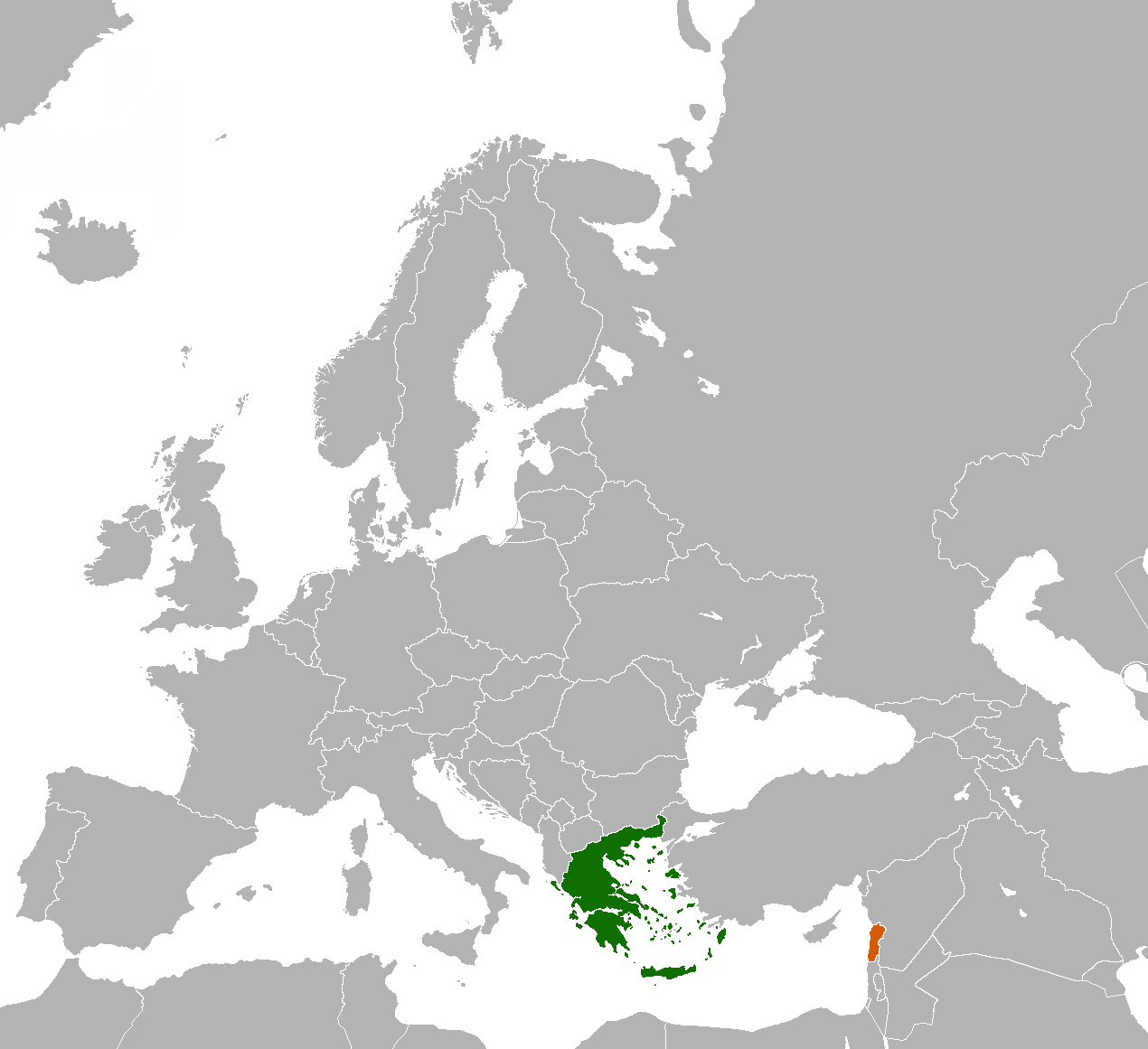
- Greece: Lebanon

Greece–Lebanon relations are the bilateral relations between Greece and Lebanon. The relation between both people dates back to early antiquity, with the early trading activities between the ancient Greeks and the Phoenicians. In modern times, Greek-Lebanese bilateral relations are very good at all levels. Greece has an embassy in Beirut and Lebanon has an embassy in Athens. Both countries are members of the Union for the Mediterranean.

In recent years (2022), following internal crisis and wars, migration from Lebanon to Europe has increased.

== History ==
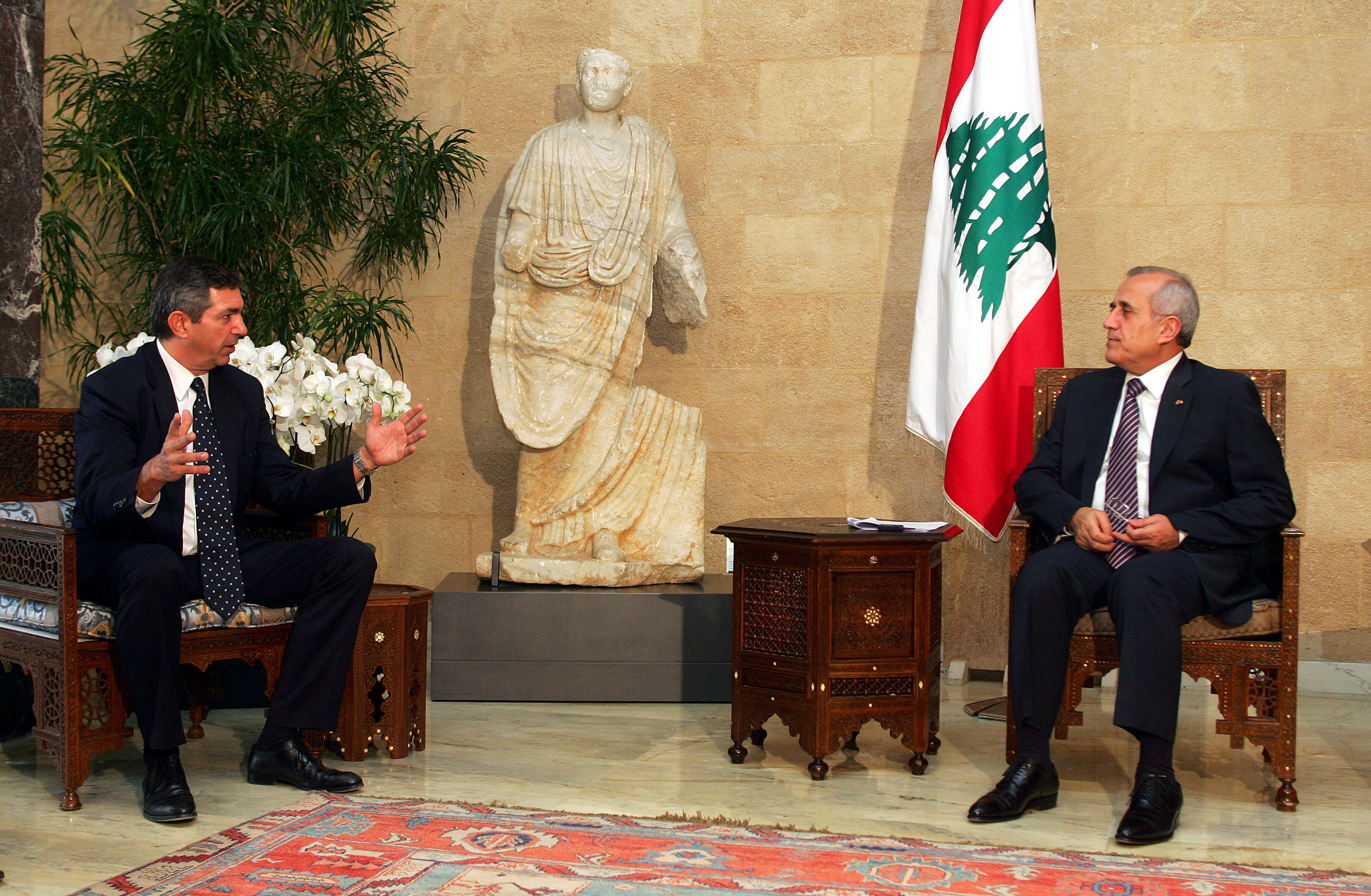
Foreign Minister of Greece Stavros Lambrinidis and President of Lebanon Michel Suleiman in October 2011

The Greek-Lebanese relations are traditionally very friendly and are characterized by mutual respect and trust. Along the historical nature between the two states, Greece has been a strong supporter of Lebanese political causes since 1948 and was the only country, along with Cyprus, to happily welcome Lebanese citizens during the Lebanese Civil War.

In the diplomatic and political field, there is a good state of cooperation and a mutual support for candidacies. Greece actively supported Lebanon during the 2006 Lebanon War. It responded immediately to the request for the provision of humanitarian aid and continues to contribute to the country's reconstruction, not only at an economic but also political level. The humanitarian aid offered by Greece to the Lebanese people, during the 2006 War is estimated at € 2.5 million, including financial contributions. Furthermore, financial assistance offered by Greece through international organisations reached €273,500. At the International Donor Conference in Paris (January 25, 2007), Greece announced further assistance funds for the construction of Lebanese infrastructure, worth €5 million.

The president of the Hellenic Republic, Karolos Papoulias, carried out a state visit in Lebanon from 13 to 16 January 2004. During this visit, relations between Greece and Lebanon were further promoted through the signing of bilateral agreements and the meeting of the two countries' business communities. The Greek Foreign Minister Dora Bakoyannis visited Lebanon at the end of August in order to be fully informed by Lebanese officials on the country's state of affairs, in view of Greece's presidency of the UN Security Council in September 2006. Other visits to Lebanon were also carried out by the head of the main Greek opposition party, George Papandreou and the Greek Deputy Finance Minister.

After the 2020 Beirut explosions, Greece sent with a C-130 military aircraft, a Special Disaster Unit search and rescue team. The team consisted of 12 members, a sniffer dog, two vehicles and equipment. The team was accompanied by the Greek Deputy Foreign Minister. The Greek Ministry for Civil Protection and Crisis Management said that it remains in contact with Lebanese authorities and stands ready to send more assistance if requested, while the Greek Prime Minister said that Greece is ready to send additional help and medical equipment to Lebanon. In addition, the Greek Jason-class tank landing ship Ikaria was sent to Lebanon with health professionals and medical supplies and equipment.

== Agreements ==
Major interstate agreements include:

- Agreement of judicial assistance and expulsion
- Agreement for the promotion and mutual protection of investments
- Consular convention of trade, shipping and installation
- Trade Agreement
- Agreement on international road transport for passengers and merchandise
- Educational Agreement for Cultural and Scientific Cooperation. Following the entry into force of this agreement, the 1949 Educational Agreement is no longer valid
- Agreement for economic and technological cooperation
- Agreement for cooperation in the field of tourism. Following the entry into force of this agreement, the Agreement on Cooperation on Tourism of 1970 is no longer valid.
- Agreement for the avoidance of double taxation of income from shipping of air transport
- Protocol of economic, scientific and technical cooperation in the field of agriculture.

== Cultural relations ==
Greece's contribution in the cultural field is significant, given that the Ministry of National Education and Religion grants 17 scholarships a year to Greek Universities and Technical Institutes. In Lebanon, there is an association of Lebanese Graduates from Greek Universities LLGGU presided by Dr.Georges Scheib and founded in 1994, whose members are approximately 140. Also within the framework of EU programmes, several Agronomy graduates have completed their studies at the Mediterranean Agronomic Institute of Chania. The existing could have further exploitation for further educational and cultural cooperation.

== Diaspora ==
=== Greeks in Lebanon ===
The Greek community in Lebanon included no more than 2,500 people before the 2006 war, but most of them have been evacuated from the country with Greek ships, in order to avoid war operations. There is a Greek community and also a Hellenic Club in Beirut. Currently, there are an estimated 1,500 Greek citizens living in Lebanon.[conflict with below]

There is a sizeable Greek Muslim population in Lebanon, namely Tripoli, which is usually overlooked by the Greek state. Recently the Greek Muslims have increasingly vocalized their opinion of gaining citizenship which is relevantly reserved for Christians. The Greek language is retained by most people in these communities. Greek Muslims make up a majority of Greeks in Lebanon with figures standing at over 10,000 people.

=== Lebanese in Greece ===
The Lebanese community in Greece currently includes approximately 30,000 citizens, concentrated mainly in the urban area of the capital Athens. Increased emigration from Lebanon in recent years has been attributed to, among other factors, decreased faith in the current Lebanese government and economy.

== Resident diplomatic missions ==
- Greece has an embassy in Beirut.
- Lebanon has an embassy in Athens.

== See also ==
- Foreign relations of Greece
- Foreign relations of Lebanon
- Iranian influence in Lebanon
- Greeks in Lebanon
- Lebanese people in Greece
