= Promises (2001 film) =

2001 documentary film

- Directed by: Carlos Bolado; B.Z. Goldberg; Justine Shapiro
- Produced by: B.Z. Goldberg; Justine Shapiro
- Starring: Moishe and Raheli Bar Am; Faraj Adnan Hassan Husein; Mahmoud Mazen Mahmoud Izhiman; Daniel Solan; Yarko Solan; Sanabel Hassan; Shlomo
- Cinematography: Ilan Buchbinder; Yoram Millo
- Edited by: Carlos Bolado
- Production company: Promises Film Project
- Distributed by: Cowboy Pictures
- Release date: January 30, 2001
- Running time: 106 minutes
- Country: United States
- Languages: English; Arabic; Hebrew

Promises is a 2001 documentary film that examines the Israeli–Palestinian conflict from the perspectives of seven children living in the Palestinian communities in the West Bank and Israeli neighborhoods of Jerusalem. Promises has been shown at many film festivals and received excellent reviews and many accolades.

The film follows Israeli-American filmmaker B.Z. Goldberg as he meets with seven Palestinian and Israeli children between the ages of nine and thirteen, seeing the Middle East conflict through their eyes. It allows "ordinary" kids to develop natural bonds of affection by simply playing games with each other, bonds which go beyond the clutter of prejudices that they have heard from their parents and others around them.

== Production ==
Promises was shot between 1997 and 2000 and was produced in association with the Independent Television Service with partial funding provided by the Corporation for Public Broadcasting.

The film has a running time of 106 minutes, and includes Arabic, Hebrew and English dialogue with English subtitles. After its theatrical run, an abridged version aired as an episode of the PBS series POV.

In 2004 the filmmakers' produced a follow-up program called Promises: Four Years On, which features interviews and updates on the children's current lives. It lasts 25 minutes and is included as a special feature on the film's DVD release.

== The children ==
- Daniel and Yarko: Israeli boys living in west Jerusalem, secular Jews, put off more by religious Jews than Palestinians; grandsons of Holocaust survivor
- Shlomo: Jewish quarter in Jerusalem, Orthodox, son of a rabbi from Jerusalem
- Moishe: lives in Beit-El in the West-Bank, dislikes the Arabs.
- Faraj: lives in the Deheishe refugee camp in the West Bank, Palestinian; son of Palestinian refugees
- Mahmoud: Palestinian quarter in East Jerusalem; son of a merchant in the Muslim quarter of the Old City
- Sanabel: Palestinian lives also in the Deheishe refuge camp, father is in prison because he was affiliated with the Popular Front for the Liberation of Palestine. Her brother died from heatstroke, he was also in prison.

== Reception ==
=== Critical response ===
Promises has an approval rating of 96% on review aggregator website Rotten Tomatoes, based on 47 reviews, and an average rating of 7.81/10. The website's critical consensus states, "A heartbreaking and illuminating look at the Israeli and Palestinian conflict through the eyes of children". Metacritic assigned the film a weighted average score of 80 out of 100, based on 16 critics, indicating "generally favorable reviews".

=== Nominations ===
- Best Documentary, 74th Academy Awards
- Best Documentary, IFP Spirit Awards
- Truer than Fiction Award, IFP Spirit Awards

=== Awards ===
- 2002 The NBR Freedom of Expression Citation National Board of Review
- 2002 The Michael Landon Award for Community Service to Youth Twenty-Third Annual Young Artist Awards
- 2001 Emmy Award, Best Documentary
- 2001 Emmy Award, Best Background Analysis
- 2001 Rotterdam International Film Festival Audience Award, Best Film
- 2001 Munich Film Festival Freedom of Expression Award
- 2001 Jerusalem Film Festival Special Festival Award
- 2001 Locarno International Film Festival Special Ecumenical Jury Prize
- 2001 San Francisco International Film Festival Audience Award, Best Documentary Grand Prize, Best Documentary Golden Gate Award, Documentary Film
- 2001 Vancouver International Film Festival Audience Award, Diversity in Spirit Award
- 2001 Hamptons International Film Festival Best Documentary
- 2001 São Paulo International Film Festival Best Documentary Audience Award
- 2001 Valladolid International Film Festival Best Documentary
- 2001 Paris International Film Festival (Rencontres) Audience Award-Best Film
