= Greeks in Lebanon =

Greeks in Lebanon (Greece)
Regions with significant populations
- Beirut (Greater Beirut), Tripoli

Languages
- Arabic, Neo-Aramaic, Greek

Religion
- Antiochian Orthodox Church, Islam

Lebanon

The Greeks in Lebanon (Greek: Έλληνες στον Λίβανο) had presence in present day Lebanon that dated to ancient history, and the Phoenicians and Greeks (both maritime peoples) shared close ties. The Greek alphabet, for example, is derived from the Phoenician one. The Greek presence is attested by several place names, and the close ties between Greeks and the Lebanese Greek Orthodox and Greek Catholic communities.

== History ==
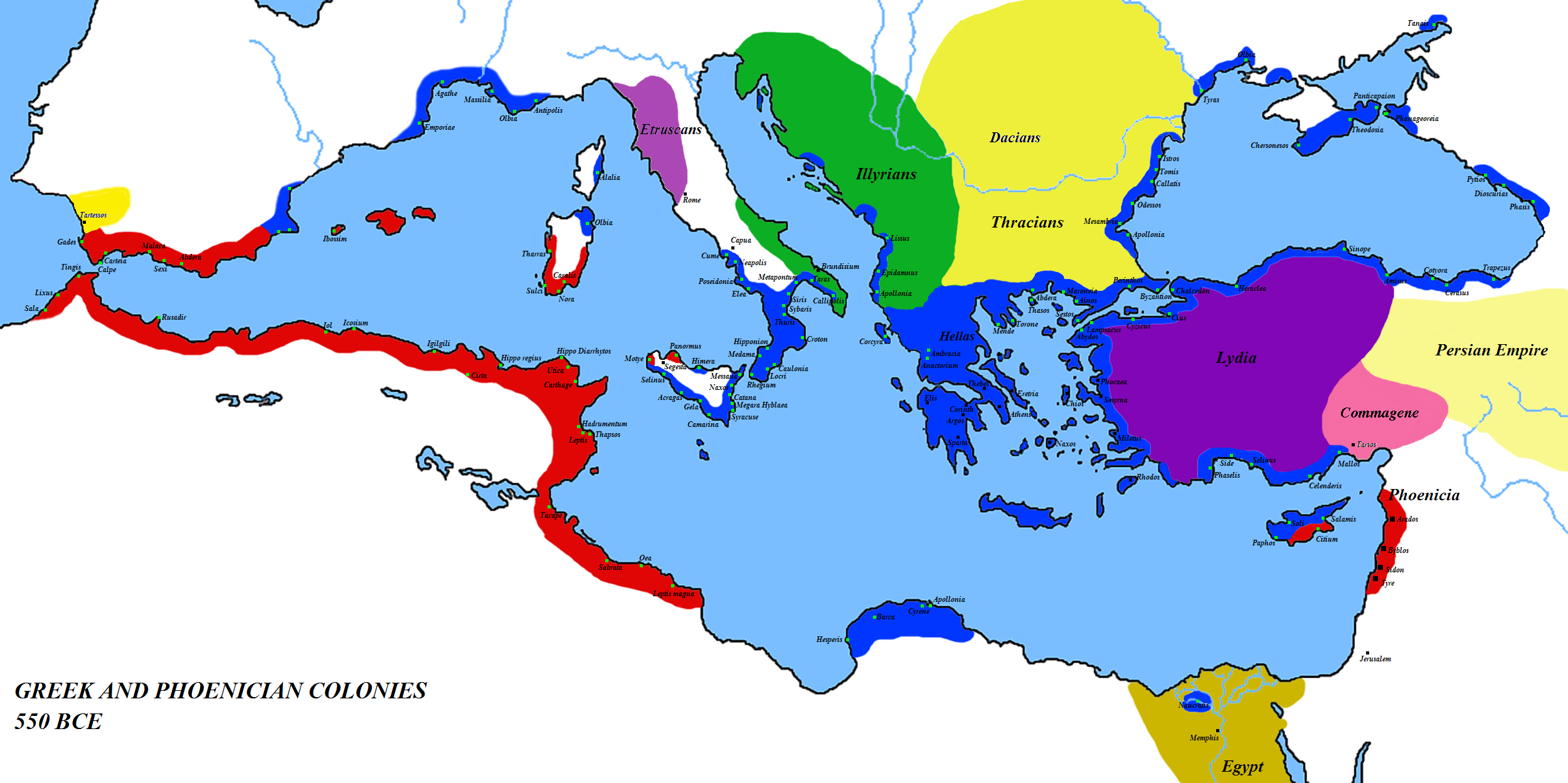
Map of Phoenician and Greek colonies at about 550 B.C.

Following the Siege of Tyre (332 BC) the area became part of the empire of Alexander the Great. In Hellenistic times the area of modern Lebanon was the site of several Greek colonies and was contested between the Seleucids and Ptolemies.

Following Christianization of the Roman Empire, Greek culture remained a strong influence, waning as the centuries passed, though not disappearing. The city of Amioun (possibly from the word for Greeks, Yunan), capital of the Koura District (in turn from the Greek χωριά, "villages") in the north of the country is a living testament of that.

Following the 2006 invasion of Lebanon by Israel most Greeks have fled the country, although there remains a Greek community in Beirut (Greater Beirut) as well as in the aforementioned Koura District.

== Greek Muslims in Lebanon ==
There are about 7,000 Greeks living in Tripoli, Lebanon and in El Mina, Lebanon. The majority of them are Muslims of Cretan origin and some of them are of Greek Muslim origin. Records suggest that the community left Crete between 1866 and 1897, on the outbreak of the last Cretan uprising against the Ottoman Empire, which ended the Greco-Turkish War of 1897. Many Greek Muslims of Lebanon somewhat managed to preserve their identity and language. Their community was close-knit and entirely endogamous. By 1988, many Greek Muslims from both Lebanon and Syria had reported being subject to discrimination by the Greek embassy because of their religious affiliation. The community members would be regarded with indifference and even hostility, and would be denied visas and opportunities to improve their Greek through trips to Greece.

== See also ==
- Achrafieh district, Beirut
- Amioun
- Lebanese Greek Orthodox Christians
- Antiochian Greek Christians
- Greece–Lebanon relations
- Greeks in Israel
- Greeks in Saudi Arabia
- Greeks in Syria
- Koura District
- Lebanese people in Greece
- Lebanese people in Cyprus
