= Forgotten (2013 film) =

2013 film

- Film poster
- Directed by: Carlos Bolado
- Written by: Mauricio d’Avis
- Starring: Damián Alcázar; Rafael Ferro; Carla Ortiz; Tomás Fonzi; Ana Celentano; Carloto Cotta; Eduardo Paxeco; Guillermo Pfening; Manuela Martelli; Cristian Mercado
- Release date: 21 June 2013
- Running time: 112 minutes
- Country: Bolivia
- Language: Spanish

Forgotten (Spanish: Olvidados) is a 2013 Bolivian drama film written by Elia Petridis and directed by Carlos Bolado, and is based on the repression and killings associated with the U.S.-backed Operation Condor. It was selected as the Bolivian entry for the Best Foreign Language Film at the 87th Academy Awards, but was not nominated.

== Cast ==
- Damián Alcázar as José Mendieta
- Rafael Ferro as Sanera
- Carla Ortiz as Lucía
- Tomás Fonzi as Antonio
- Ana Celentano as Andrea
- Eduardo Paxeco as Jorge

== See also ==
- List of submissions to the 87th Academy Awards for Best Foreign Language Film
- List of Bolivian submissions for the Academy Award for Best Foreign Language Film
