= The Man Who Shook the Hand of Vicente Fernandez =

2012 film

- Film poster
- Directed by: Elia Petridis
- Written by: Elia Petridis
- Produced by: Darren Brandl; Dave O'Brien; Elia Petridis
- Starring: Ernest Borgnine; Barry Corbin; Carla Ortiz
- Cinematography: Eric Leach
- Edited by: Terel Gibson
- Music by: Ruy Folguera
- Production company: Filmatics
- Distributed by: Indican Pictures
- Release date: April 27, 2012
- Running time: 99 minutes
- Country: United States
- Language: English

The Man Who Shook the Hand of Vicente Fernandez is a 2012 American Western film written and directed by Elia Petridis, and starring Ernest Borgnine in his final role.

== Plot ==
A retired radio disc jockey/actor is forced to enter a nursing home, where he unexpectedly finds the respect and acclaim that eluded him throughout his long career.

== Cast ==
- Ernest Borgnine as Rex Page
- Barry Corbin as Walker
- Carla Ortiz as Solena
- Arturo Del Puerto as Alejandro
- Tony Plana as Dr. Dominguez
- Dale Dickey as Denise
- June Squibb as Irma
- Audrey P. Scott as Clementine
- Reynaldo Pacheco as Miguel
- Ashley Holliday as Rita
- Nathalie Kelley as Pretty Annie
- Alex Fernandez as Bandito / Paramedic
- Dylan Kenin as Cowboy
- Robert Morse as Burt

== Reception ==
As of January 2022, the film holds a 40% approval rating on Rotten Tomatoes, based on five reviews with an average rating of 5.5/10.
