= Only God Knows =

2006 film directed by Carlos Bolado

- Theatrical release poster
- Spanish: Sólo Dios sabe
- Portuguese: Só Deus sabe
- Directed by: Carlos Bolado
- Written by: Carlos Bolado; Diane Weipert
- Produced by: Carlos Bolado; Sara Silveira; Yissel Ibarra
- Starring: Alice Braga; Diego Luna
- Cinematography: Frederico Barbosa
- Edited by: Carlos Bolado; Manuela Dias
- Music by: Otto; Julieta Venegas
- Production companies: Dezenove Som e Imagens; Sincronía Films; Miravista
- Distributed by: Buena Vista International
- Release dates: January 21, 2006 (Sundance); September 15, 2006 (Mexico)
- Running time: 115 minutes
- Countries: Brazil; Mexico
- Languages: Spanish; Portuguese; English
- Budget: $3 million

Only God Knows (Spanish: Sólo Dios sabe; Portuguese: Só Deus sabe) is a 2006 Mexican-Brazilian drama film directed by Carlos Bolado. It stars Alice Braga as Dolores, a Brazilian woman, who meets Dámian (Diego Luna), a Mexican who helps her to reach Mexico City after her passport is stolen.

Co-produced between Brazil and Mexico after an agreement undersigned in Venezuela, it is the first film produced jointly by the two countries. Filming took place in 2004 in Tijuana, Mexico City, Salvador, São Paulo, and San Diego. Post-production was done in São Paulo in 2005 and sound effects were produced in Skywalker Sound.

Its world premiere occurred on January 21 at the 2006 Sundance Film Festival, where it competed in the category Cinema Dramatic of the World Cinema section. It also entered the official selection of the Guadalajara International Film Festival and the Festival de Cine Iberoamericano de Huelva.

== Plot ==
Dolores is a Brazilian working in the USA who goes on a night out with friends across the border in Mexico where her passport gets stolen and found by a Mexican freelance journalist Damian. He helps her get to Mexico city as she believes she needs to reach the Embassy to get new papers to leave the country. The two fall in love during the journey, however the discovery that Damian had her passport all along puts them at odds. Dolores goes back to Brazil as her grandmother has suddenly passed. Dolores discovers she is pregnant despite her thinking she is unable to conceive. Damian follows her to Brazil. When it seems that they may have found each other and have a chance at happiness, fate has other plans.

== Cast ==
- Alice Braga as Dolores
  - Isabella Sass as young Dolores
- Diego Luna as Damián
- Mariana Muniz as Dolores' grandmother
- José María Yazpik as Jonathan
- Cecilia Suárez as Olivia
- Renata Zhaneta as Renata
- Damián Alcázar as Presagio
- Leigh Crow as Mrs Bailey

== See also ==
- List of media set in San Diego
