= Tlatelolco, verano del 68 =

- Film poster
- Directed by: Carlos Bolado
- Written by: Carlos Bolado; Luis Felipe Ybarra
- Produced by: Carlos Bolado; Carolina Rivera; Luis Felipe Ybarra
- Starring: Christian Vazquez; Cassandra Ciangherotti
- Music by: Christian Basso
- Release date: 18 April 2013 (Chicago Latino Film Festival)
- Running time: 105 minutes
- Countries: Mexico; Argentina
- Language: Spanish

Tlatelolco, verano del 68 (Spanish for "Tlatelolco, summer of 68") is a 2013 Mexican film about the political events that took place in Mexico City in the months before the 1968 Olympics.

== Plot ==
In the midst of protests of Mexico 68, two teenagers, Felix (Christian Vazquez) and Ana Maria (Cassandra Ciangherotti), from different social classes fall in love. The story begins with increasing repression of the student movement by the government of Gustavo Diaz Ordaz in the months prior to the Tlatelolco massacre of October 2, 1968. The relationship of Ana Maria and Felix takes place in the context of repression, forced disappearances, and an attempt to obscure the social protest.
