= Secreto de amor (TV series) =

- Genre: Telenovela
- Created by: Alberto Gómez
- Written by: Omaira Rivero
- Directed by: Luis Sánchez; Yaky Ortega
- Starring: Scarlet Ortiz; Jorge Aravena; Aura Cristina Geithner; Jorge Luis Pila; Astrid Gruber
- Opening theme: "Secreto de Amor" by Joan Sebastian
- Ending theme: "Secreto de Amor" by Joan Sebastian
- Countries of origin: Venezuela; United States
- Original language: Spanish
- No. of episodes: 151

Production
- Executive producer: Alfredo Schwarz
- Production location: Miami
- Cinematography: Eduardo Dávila; Reinaldo Figueira
- Running time: 45 minutes
- Production company: Venevisión

Original release
- Network: Venevisión; Univision
- Release: July 24, 2001 – February 12, 2002

Related
- La revancha; Gata salvaje

Secreto de amor (Secret of Love) is an American telenovela produced by Venevisión International in 2001. The telenovela was filmed in Miami, Florida, and it starred Scarlet Ortiz and Jorge Aravena as the main protagonists while Colombian actress Aura Cristina Geithner and Venezuelan actress Astrid Gruber starred as the main antagonists.

== Plot ==
Maria Clara Carvajal is a beautiful, modern girl who works hard in order to support her ailing mother and younger sister. She is in love with Carlos Raúl, a young mechanic. Despite their poor financial situation, they are prepared to get married. however, their plans will not be realized when Carlos Raúl is fired from his job, and decides to move to Miami to seek a better life just a few days before their wedding. Maria Clara promises to wait for Carlos Raul while he looks for a good job in the United States.

In Miami, Carlos Raúl begins to work as a valet in a luxurious hotel owned by the wealthy Serrano Zulbarán family. Here she meets Barbara Serrano Zulbarán, one of the family heirs. Barbara is instantly attracted to Carlos, and they begin a passionate affair. Carlos Raúl is attracted by Barbara's beauty and wealth, and he forgets all about Maria Clara.

Meanwhile, in Caracas, Maria Clara's mother dies, and pressured by her ambitious sister Andrea, she moves to Miami together with her god-mother Coralia. Within a short time, she discovers Carlos Raúl's deception. After a while, Maria Clara meets Lisandro, Barbara's handsome widower brother who is captivated by her beauty and kindness. Through several circumstances, Maria Clara marries Lisandro even though she doesn't love him. With both Maria Clara and Carlos Raúl stuck in loveless marriages, will they still be able to revive the love they once felt for each other?

== Cast ==
Actor	Character	Description
Scarlet Ortiz	Maria Clara Roldan Carvajal	Main protagonist, Carlos Raúl's fiancée from Venezuela, who marries Lisandro after being hired as a companion to his grandmother Mrs Prudencia.
Jorge Aravena	Carlos Raúl Fonseca	Maria Clara's fiancée who marries Bárbara after arriving to Miami. He remains in love with Maria Clara throughout his marriage to Bárbara, He is Teresita's biological father.
Aura Cristina Geithner	Bárbara Serrano Zulbarán	Lisandro's sister, a rich privileged girl who forces Carlos Raúl to marry her. She is the main villain of the series as she tries to sabotage Maria Clara throughout the series.
Astrid Gruber	Vilma Altamirano Santana	Lisandro's and Barbara's evil scheming cousin who is in fact poor, she is a thief who targets rich men and robs them along with her lover Amado, she sets her eyes on her cousin Lisandro to marry him and obtain his wealth.
Jorge Luis Pila	Lisandro Serrano Zulbarán	Barbara's brother, After losing his former fiancée Sylvana in a car accident, he gives up on finding love until meeting Maria Clara.
Carla Ortiz	Andrea Carvajal	Maria Clara's sister, Coralia's god-daughter, she falls in love with Lisandro and starts working as a maid at the Serrano Zulbarán hotel hoping to get closer to him. She is jealous of her sister's relationship with him, which causes a wedge between them.
Yul Bürkle	Braulio Viloria	Barbara's former lover who is still in love with her. He is Victoria's son and Reinaldo's brother. He develops a relationship with a gold digger named Pierina.
Anna Silvetti	Victoria Viloria	A wealthy woman and a Gym owner. She is Braulio's and Reinaldo's mother. She has a secret relationship with Luciano, a 25 years old man who works at her gym as a coach.
Lino Ferrer	Florencio Gordoño	Carlos Raúl's friend who owns diner in Miami, he hosts Maria Clara, Coralia and Andrea at his apartment.
Griselda Noguera	Prudencia Santana de Serrano Zulbarán	Matriarch of the Serrano Zulbarán family, Lisandro, Barbara and Vilma's grandmother. After being hit by a car, she becomes paralyzed.
Yadira Santana	Coralia Hernandez	Maria Clara's and Andrea's dedicated god-mother.
Sandro Finoglio	Luciano Ibañez	A gym coach, Victoria's younger lover and Pierina's ex-husband.
Adriana Cataño	Elisa Ferrer	Victoria's secretary. Erasmo's niece and Amado's lover. She holds a grudge against Maria Clara for testifying against Amado.
Hans Christopher	Amado Cáceres	Victoria's chauffeur, Vilma and Elisa's lover. He blackmails Victoria and attempts to rape Maria Clara.
Claudia Reyes	Melisa Padilla	Barbara's friend, who was formerly in a relationship with Reinaldo.
Humberto Rossenfeld	Reinaldo Viloria	Victoria's son, Braulio's brother, he is a trained lawyer. He falls in love with Lluvia.
Zurich Valera	Natalia Diaz	Maid at the Serrano Zulbarán mansion, Maria Clara's friend.
Reinaldo Cruz	Erasmo Ferrer	Victoria's friend and Elisa's uncle. He had a relationship with Maria Clara's mother in Venezuela 20 years ago.
Annette Vega	Luna	Maid at the Serrano Zulbarán hotels, Florencio's girlfriend.
Luis Masias	Alexander Rios	Braulio's friend.
Yina Velez	Ines Lara	Maid at the Serrano Zulbarán mansion.
Carlos Mesber	Alfonso	Bellboy at the Serrano Zulbarán hotels.
Lisbeth Manrique	Lluvia	Maid at Victoria's house, Maria Clara's friend, Julia's niece. She later starts working as an exotic dancer at a strip club while pretending to be a nurse.
Ariel Lopez Padilla	Dr. Ricardo Sandoval	A plastic surgeon who operates on Andrea.
Astrid Carolina Herrera	Yesenia Roldan	A record producer, who signs Carlos Raul, she arrives to Miami to seek revenge against Lisandro for her sister Sylvana's death.
Ana Karina Casanova	Erica (Frederica)	Yesenia and Sylvana's sister.
Estefania Briceño	Danielita/Teresita	Daughter of Maria Clara and Carlos Raul, who gets kidnapped.
Gabriela Orúe-Paz	Friend in Caracas	Friend of Maria Clara's Mother and nurse in Miami Hospital.

== International Broadcastings ==
Country	Network	Local title	Series premiere	Timeslot	Episodes
Algeria	ENTV	قلوب حائرة	January 2006	Saturday to Wednesday 13:30	125
Kenya	NTV	Secreto de Amor	2004	20:00 - 21:00	151
Morocco	2M TV	قلوب حائرة			125
Saudi Arabia	MBC	قلوب حائرة	2003	Daily except Fridays	125
Somaliland	Horn Cable Television	Maariya Kalaara	October 20, 2007	19:00	380
Tunisia	Hannibal TV	قلوب حائرة			125
