= Sandro Finoglio =

Venezuelan actor and model, Mister World 1998

- Born: Sandro Finoglio Esperanza; January 3, 1973 (age 52); Caracas, Venezuela
- Occupation(s): Actor, model
- Title: Mister World 1998; Mister Venezuela 1997

Sandro Finoglio (born Sandro Finoglio Esperanza; January 3, 1973) is a Venezuelan actor, model, tv host and beauty pageant titleholder who the winner of Mister Venezuela 1997, Finoglio was sent to Troia, Portugal a year later to compete in the Mister World 1998 competition, which he won. His father is from Rome and his Mother is from Pisa.

== Filmography ==
- Ellas, inocentes o culpables (Mexico, TV Azteca)
- Secreto de amor (United States, Univision)
- Gata Salvaje (United States, Univision)
- Por todo lo alto (Venezuela, RCTV)

Awards and achievements
Preceded by (Belgium) Tom Nuyens	Mister World; 1998	Succeeded by (Uruguay) Ignacio Kliche
Preceded by José Gregorio Faría	Mister Venezuela; 1997	Succeeded by Ernesto Calzadilla
