= Mister World 1998 =

Male beauty pageant held in Tróia Peninsula, Portugal

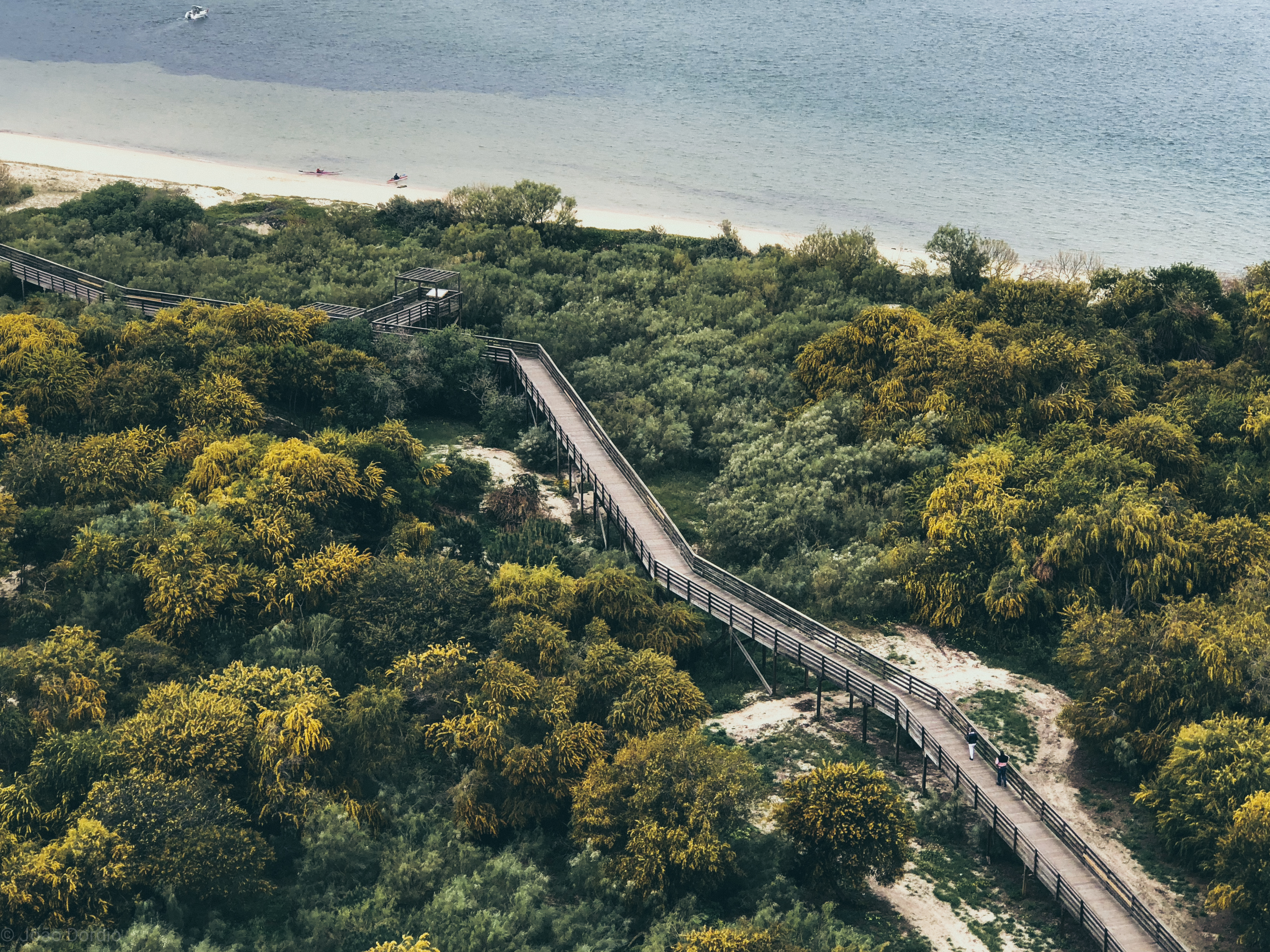
- Tróia Peninsula, host region for Mister World 1998
- Date: September 18, 1998
- Presenters: Júlia Pinheiro
- Entertainment: Fafá de Belém
- Venue: Tróia Peninsula, Grândola, Portugal
- Broadcaster: SIC
- Entrants: 43
- Placements: 12
- Debuts: Egypt; Malta; Peru; Portugal; Sri Lanka; Uruguay
- Withdrawals: Aruba; Botswana; Bulgaria; Canada; Dominican Republic; Estonia; Macedonia FYRO; South Africa; Swaziland; Sweden; Thailand; Trinidad and Tobago
- Winner: Sandro Finoglio; Venezuela
- Personality: Dimitri Drabakoulos; Greece
- Photogenic: Rubim Fonseca; Portugal

Mister World 1998 was the second Mister World competition, held at the Tróia Peninsula in Grândola, Portugal, on September 18, 1998. Tom Nuyens of Belgium crowned Sandro Finoglio of Venezuela at the end of the event.

== Results ==
=== Placements ===
Placement	Contestant
Mister World 1998	Venezuela – Sandro Finoglio Speranza
1st Runner-Up	Puerto Rico – Germán Cardoso Méndez
2nd Runner-Up	France – Gregory Rossi
Top 6	Jamaica – Kinte Thelwell; Spain – Enrique Miranda García; United States – Daniel Weaver
Top 12	Australia – Joel Williams; Belgium – Franck Clemente; Latvia – Gatis Didrihsons; Norway – Espen Engtroe; United Kingdom - Brett Phippen; Yugoslavia – Darko Marojević

=== Special awards ===
Award	Contestant
Mister Personality	Greece – Dimitri Drabakoulos
Mister Photogenic	Portugal – Rubim Fonseca

== Contestants ==
Country	Contestant	Age	Height	Hometown
Argentina	Mariano Fernández	25	1.82 m (5 ft 11 1/2 in)	Macachín
Australia	Joel Williams	25	1.85 m (6 ft 1 in)	Gold Coast
Austria	Andreas Sappl	28	1.90 m (6 ft 3 in)	Breitenbach am Inn
Belgium	Franck Clemente	27	1.85 m (6 ft 1 in)	Liège
Bolivia	Steven Aras Zallio	21	1.83 m (6 ft 0 in)	Santa Cruz de la Sierra
Brazil	Edilson Leite Ferreira	23	1.83 m (6 ft 0 in)	Brasília
Colombia	Felipe Arturo Barbosa Carrasco	25	1.82 m (5 ft 11 1/2 in)	Barranquilla
Croatia	Leonid Holjar	20	1.89 m (6 ft 2 1/2 in)	Rijeka
Egypt	Hani Salama	20	1.97 m (6 ft 5 1/2 in)	Cairo
France	Gregory Rossi	22	1.88 m (6 ft 2 in)	Cassis
Germany	Adrian Virgil Ursache	23	1.87 m (6 ft 1 1/2 in)	Berlin
Greece	Dimitri Drabakoulos	22	1.87 m (6 ft 1 1/2 in)	Athens
Holland	Richard van Bokkum	24	1.83 m (6 ft 0 in)	Rotterdam
Hungary	Kristian Chis	23	1.88 m (6 ft 2 in)	Eger
India	Sachin Khurana	22	1.83 m (6 ft 0 in)	Delhi
Ireland	Brian Guidera	23	1.95 m (6 ft 5 in)	Dublin
Israel	Elad Madany	22	1.84 m (6 ft 1/2 in)	Tel Aviv
Italy	Matteo Mammì	22	1.87 m (6 ft 1 1/2 in)	Milan
Jamaica	Kinte Thelwell	23	1.94 m (6 ft 4 1/2 in)	Kingston
Latvia	Gatis Didrihsons	24	1.91 m (6 ft 3 in)	Ventspils
Lebanon	Ghassan Mawla	20	1.87 m (6 ft 1 1/2 in)	Beirut
Malaysia	Yap Leong Chai	26	1.80 m (5 ft 11 in)	Kuala Lumpur
Malta	Nikovich Sammut	21	1.83 m (6 ft 0 in)	Bugibba
Mexico	Eduardo Rodríguez Álvarez	24	1.84 m (6 ft 1/2 in)	San Luis Potosí
Norway	Espen Engtroe	23	1.88 m (6 ft 2 in)	Kristiansund
Peru	Jean Pierre Vismara	23	1.87 m (6 ft 1 1/2 in)	Callao
Philippines	Rico Lee Miguel	21	1.82 m (5 ft 11 1/2 in)	Batangas City
Poland	Robert Koszucki	21	1.89 m (6 ft 2 1/2 in)	Kraków
Portugal	Rubim Fonseca	25	1.86 m (6 ft 1 in)	Lisbon
Puerto Rico	Germán Cardoso Méndez	22	1.85 m (6 ft 1 in)	San Juan
Russia	Aleksey Korolev	24	1.88 m (6 ft 2 in)	Moscow
Singapore	Alvin Tan Wei Jin	21	1.79 m (5 ft 10 1/2 in)	Singapore
Slovakia	Matúš Haňo	22	1.80 m (5 ft 11 in)	Vranov nad Topľou
Slovenia	Eduard Žalar	22	1.88 m (6 ft 2 in)	Maribor
Spain	Enrique Miranda García	27	1.87 m (6 ft 1 1/2 in)	Cádiz
Sri Lanka	Tariq Saleem	22	1.83 m (6 ft 0 in)	Colombo
Turkey	Bora Erdem	29	1.88 m (6 ft 2 in)	İzmir
Ukraine	Ihor Skrypnychenko	17	1.92 m (6 ft 3 1/2 in)	Odesa
United Kingdom	Brett Phippen	26	1.84 m (6 ft 1/2 in)	Swansea
United States	Daniel Weaver	29	1.96 m (6 ft 5 in)	Los Angeles
Uruguay	Mauro Ramírez del Puerto	24	1.88 m (6 ft 2 in)	Montevideo
Venezuela	Sandro Finoglio Speranza	25	1.86 m (6 ft 1 in)	Caracas
Yugoslavia	Darko Marojević	25	1.88 m (6 ft 2 in)	Belgrade
