= Alexandros Abdel Rahim =

Greek footballer

Personal information
- Date of birth: 23 September 1993 (age 33)
- Place of birth: Athens, Greece
- Height: 1.78 m (5 ft 10 in)
- Position: Winger

Team information
- Current team: Skënderbeu

Youth career
- AEK (Athens)

Senior career*
Years	Team	Apps	(Gls)
-2012	Olympiakos Laurium		
2013	Acharnaikos	11	(5)
2013	Panelefsiniakos		
2014	Glyfada		
2014	Kifisia		
2015	Panserraikos		
2015	Sparta (Greece)		
2016	Kalamata		
2016	Panarkadikos		
2017	Panargiakos		
2017	Philippos Alexandreia		
2018	Pelopas Kiato		
2018	Kastrioti	3	(0)
2018-2019	Egaleo		
2019	Rodos		
2020	Asteras Vlachioti		
2020	Kifisia		
2021-	Skënderbeu	3	(0)
- * Club domestic league appearances and goals

Alexandros Abdel Rahim (Greek: Αλέξανδρος Αμπντέλ Ραχήμ; born 23 September 1993) is a Greek professional footballer who plays as a winger.

== Club career ==
Abdel Rahim started his career with Greek lower league side Olympiakos Laurium after playing for the youth academy of AEK (Athens), one of the most successful clubs in Greece.

In 2018, Abdel Rahim signed for Kastrioti in the Albanian top flight after playing for Greek fourth division team Pelopas Kiato, where he made three league appearances. On 18 August 2018, Abdel Rahim made his league debut for Kastrioti during a 1–0 win over Luftëtari (Gjirokastër).

Before the second half of 2020–21, he signed for Skënderbeu in the Albanian top flight after playing for Greek fourth division outfit Kifisia.

== International career ==
Abdel Rahim is eligible to represent Sudan internationally through his father.
