= Greeks in Israel =

Greeks
Regions with significant populations
- Jerusalem · Nazareth · Bethlehem · Haifa · Tel Aviv-Yafo

Languages
- Greek, Hebrew, Arabic, Neo-Aramaic, Yevanic, and Ladino

Religion
- Greek Orthodox Church, Melkite Greek Catholic Church, Judaism

Related ethnic groups
- Greeks in Lebanon, Greeks in Turkey

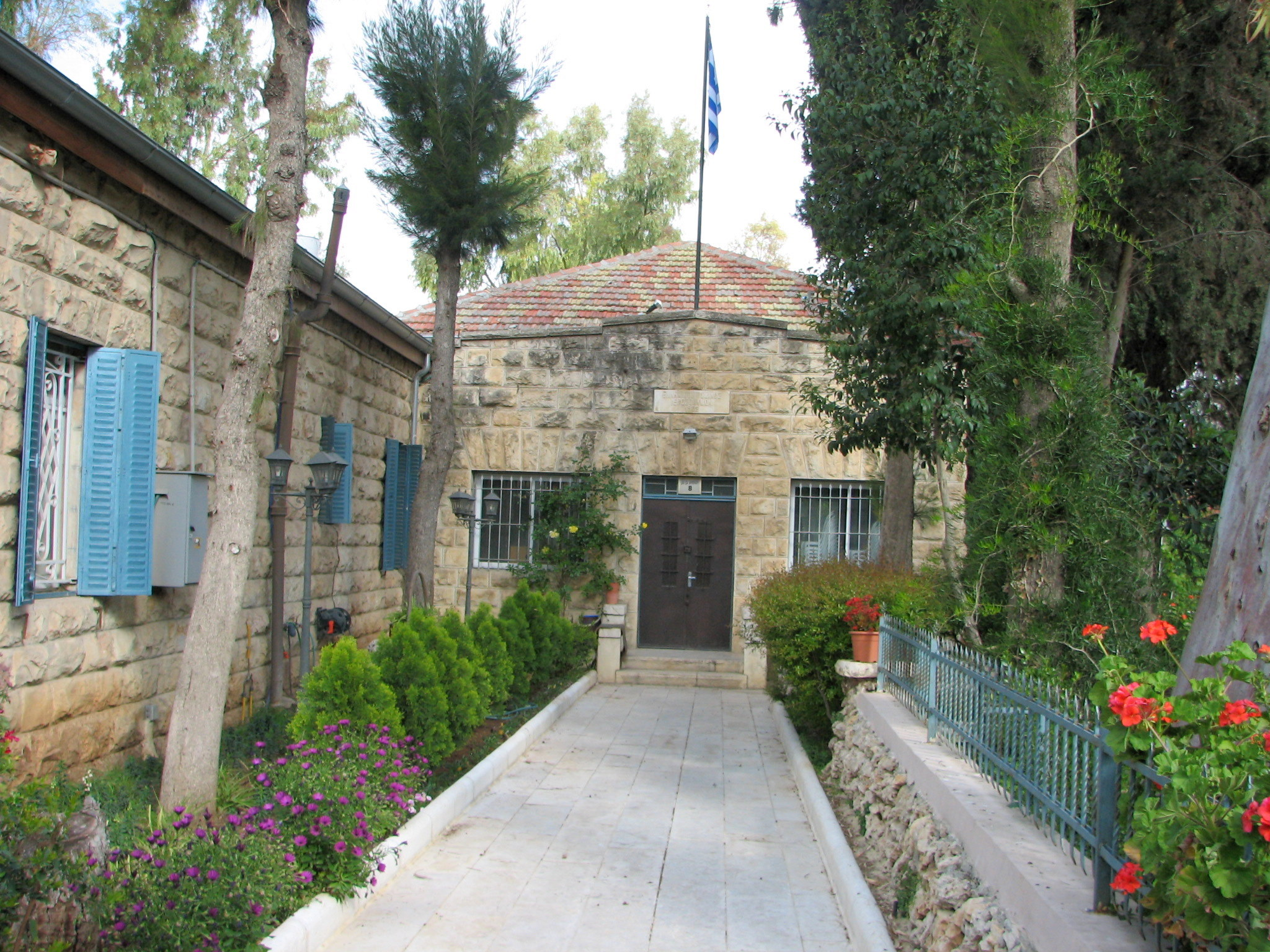
Greek Colony, Jerusalem

For millennia, the Greeks in Israel (also known as Rūm) have been prominently present in the Land of Israel. Greek expatriates comprise most of the leadership of the Eastern Greek Orthodox Church in Israel and the Palestinian Territories, in an arrangement that long predates the modern State of Israel.

== History ==
=== Classic period ===
In the late 330s BCE, Alexander the Great invaded the Middle East (including the area which is now Israel), during his campaigns against the Achaemenid Empire. The landscape during this period was markedly changed by extensive growth and development that included urban planning and the establishment of well-built fortified cities. Hellenistic pottery, trade and commerce flourished, particularly in the most Hellenized areas, such as Ashkelon, Jaffa, Jerusalem, Gaza, and ancient Nablus (Tell Balatah).

When the Hasmonean Kingdom was absorbed into the Roman Empire, the area remained under the influence of the Greek language and culture. Especially during the Byzantine period, Palaestina reached its greatest prosperity in antiquity. Urbanization increased, large new areas were put under cultivation, monasteries proliferated and synagogues were restored. The cities of Palaestina Prima and Teria, such as Caesarea Maritima, Jerusalem, Scythopolis, Neapolis, and Gaza reached their peak population, and the population west of the Jordan may have reached as many as one million.

=== Middle Ages ===
Since the 7th century, when the Arabs conquered the region, the Greek presence was reduced. . Also, there are Greeks in charge of the Greek Orthodox Patriarchate of Jerusalem. There is also a large number of Romaniote and Sephardic Greek Jews who emigrated from Greece and live now in Israel, some of whom made aliyah over the previous centuries, with most moving to Israel after Israeli independence.

=== Modern era ===
The 1922 census of Palestine lists 1,315 Greek speakers in Mandatory Palestine (7 in Southern, 1,044 in Jerusalem-Jaffa, 19 in Samaria, and 245 in Northern), including 1,230 in municipal areas (760 in Jerusalem, 161 in Jaffa, 205 in Haifa, 4 in Gaza, 1 in Hebron, 6 in Nablus, 1 in Safad, 1 in Lydda, 12 in Nazareth, 20 in Ramleh, 1 in Tiberias, 29 in Bethlehem, 11 in Acre, 2 in Tulkarem, 1 in Ramallah, 4 in Beit Jala, 10 in Jenin, 1 in Beersheba, and 1 in Baisan).

During the WWII some of the Greek community went to Greece voluntarily to fight against the Axis powers.

== Notable people ==
- Salamo Arouch, boxer
- Ofir Akunis, politician
- Yehuda Poliker, singer and musician
- Aris San, singer and nightclub owner who popularized Greek music in Israel
- Patriarch Irenaios
- Patriarch Theophilos III of Jerusalem

== See also ==
- History of the Jews in Greece
- Greek Colony, Jerusalem
- Greece–Israel relations
- Greek Orthodox Patriarch of Jerusalem
- Greek music in Israel
- Hellenistic Judaism
