= River of Renewal =

2006 book by Stephen Most

River of Renewal: Myth and History in the Klamath Basin
- Author: Stephen Most
- Publication date: 2006, 2024
- ISBN: 978-0-295-98622-7

River of Renewal: Myth and History in the Klamath Basin is a 2006 book by Stephen Most detailing the challenges in balancing economic and ecological concerns in the Klamath Basin region of the United States. The book shows clashes between federal and state government agencies, American Indian tribes, hydroelectric dam operators, and the farming and commercial fishery industries, detailing challenges and controversies around the irrigation of farmland and the preservation of the wild salmon population.

The book traces the history of the Klamath Basin, including the Yurok, Hupa, and Karuk tribal populations, the secessionist State of Jefferson movement, and regional Bigfoot legends. The second edition tells the story of the revival of cultural fire by the Klamath River tribes and recounts how the largest dam removal and watershed restoration project in history came about.

== 2008 film ==
It was adapted into a 2008 non-fiction film, River of Renewal, that received the Best Documentary Award at the American Indian Film Festival. The film was also broadcast on PBS.
