= Lebanese people in Greece =

Total population
- 30,000 people (by descent)

Regions with significant populations
- Athens, Thessaloniki, Piraeus, Patras

Languages
- Arabic language and Greek language

Religion
- Mostly Greek Orthodox, with Muslim and Catholic minorities

Related ethnic groups
- Other Arabs in Greece, Lebanese people in Cyprus

Lebanese people in Greece (Greek: Λιβανέζοι στην Ελλάδα, Arabic: يوناني لبناني) include immigrants and descendants of immigrants from Lebanon, numbering approximately 30,000 people of Lebanese descent. Migration from Lebanon to Greece started after 1975 during the Lebanese Civil War. Most Lebanese came from Koura District in North Lebanon, which is mostly a Greek Orthodox area. During the civil war the number of Lebanese was higher, however after the end of the war many returned to Lebanon.

== Notable people ==
- Rony Seikaly, Lebanese-born American basketballer, brought up in Athens.

== See also ==
- Greece–Lebanon relations
- Lebanese diaspora
- Immigration to Greece
- Lebanese people in Cyprus, ca. 20,000 people
- Arabs in Greece
- Greeks in Lebanon
