= Arabs in Greece =

Regions with significant populations
- Athens, Thessaloniki

Languages
- Arabic, Greek

Religion
- Majority: Christianity (Oriental Orthodox Church, Maronite Church, Melkite Church); Minority: Islam

Related ethnic groups
- Arab people, Arab diaspora, Lebanese Greek, Egyptians, Iraqis, Lebanese, Syrians, Palestinians, Jordanians

Arabs in Greece (Greek: Άραβες στην Ελλάδα, Arabic: العرب في اليونان), known as Araves, are the people from countries of the Arab world, particularly Egypt, Iraq, Lebanon, the Palestinian territories, Syria, many of whom are Christian, and also small groups from Yemen, Algeria, Tunisia, Morocco, Libya and Sudan, who emigrated from their native nations and currently reside in Greece and are mainly Muslim. Although some of these people belong to different religions and ethnic descent, such as Coptic Christians, Berbers, Syriacs and Kurds, they are usually referred to as Arabs. The majority tend to live in Athens and Thessaloniki. However, they can be found in all parts of the country. In addition, Greece has people from Arab countries, who have the status of refugees (e.g. refugees of the Syrian civil war) or illegal immigrants trying to immigrate to Western Europe.

== Notable people ==
- Alexandros Abdel Rahim
- Angelos Chanti
- Marina Satti
