= List of Bolivian films =

This is a list of films produced in Bolivia from the 1920s to present.

== 1920s ==
Title	Director	Cast	Genre	Notes
1925
Corazón Aymara	Pedro Sambarino		black and white, silent drama	considered to be the first Bolivian fiction feature film
The Prophecy of the Lake	José Maria Velasco Maidana		black and white, silent romance	Bolivia's second completed fiction feature film; banned by the authorities for its social critique and its portrayal of a white woman in love with an indigenous man; never released

== 1930s ==
Title	Director	Cast	Genre	Notes
1930
Wara Wara	José Maria Velasco Maidana	Juanita Taillansier, Martha de Velasco, Arturo Borda, Emmo Reyes	black and white, silent, historical romance	the only known surviving work from Bolivia's silent-film era
1931
Hacia la Gloria	José Maria Velasco Maidana			

== 1950s ==
Title	Director	Cast	Genre	Notes
1950
1951
1952
1953
Vuelve Sebastiana	Augusto Roca & Jorge Ruiz	Luis Ramiro Beltrán, Sebastiana Kespi, Eduardo Lafaye, Esteban Lupi, Jean Vellard	Drama	
1954
1955
1956
1957
1958
1959

== 1960s ==
Title	Director	Cast	Genre	Notes
1960
1961
1962
1963
1964
1965
1966
Ukamau	Jorge Sanjinés	Vicente Veneros Salinas, Elsa Antequera, Néstor Cárdenas, Benedicta Huanca		First feature film to use both Spanish and a native language (Aymara)
1967
1968
Mina Alaska	Jorge Ruiz	Hugo Roncal, Chrysta Wagner, Charlie Smith		First Latin American film to be restored by the AMPAS Film Archive.
1969
Yawar mallku	Jorge Sanjinés			

== 1970s ==
Title	Director	Cast	Genre	Notes
1970
1971
El Coraje del pueblo	Jorge Sanjinés			
1972
1973
1974
1975
Andean Women	Norman Miller			
1976
Chuquiago	Antonio Eguino			
La chaskañawi	Hugo Cuellar Urizar, Jorge Cuellar Urizar, José Cuellar Urizar			
1977
1978
1979

== 1980s ==
Title	Director	Cast	Genre	Notes
1980
1981
El celibato	Hugo Cuellar Urizar, José Cuellar Urizar			
1982
Mi socio	Paolo Agazzi			Entered into the 13th Moscow International Film Festival
1983
1984
Amargo mar	Antonio Eguino			
Aymara Leadership	Hubert Smith			
Los Hermanos Cartagena	Paolo Agazzi			
1985
1986
Café con pan	Alfredo Ovando			
1987
1988
1989
La chola Remedios	Liliana De la Quintana, Alfredo Ovando			
La nación clandestina	Jorge Sanjinés			

== 1990s ==
Title	Director	Cast	Genre	Notes
1990
1991
Los igualitarios	Juan Miranda			
1992
1993
1994
Jonás y la Ballena Rosada	Juan Carlos Valdivia			
1995
Cuestión de fe	Marcos Loayza			
Jonah and the Pink Whale	Juan Carlos Valdivia			
Para recibir el canto de los pájaros	Jorge Sanjinés			
1996
Alma (Ajayu)	Francisco Ormachea			
La despedida	Fernando Aguilar Vásquez			
1997
1998
El Día que Murió el Silencio	Paolo Agazzi			
1999
Calle de los poetas	Diego Torres Peñaloza			
Desempolvando nuestra historia	Alfredo Copa			
El camino de la costa	José Sánchez			

== 2000s ==
Title	Director	Cast	Genre	Notes
2000
2001
Cierre de emisión	Javier Rivero			
El delirio	José Sánchez			
The Delirium	José Sánchez			
2002
2003
Sexual Dependency	Rodrigo Bellott	Alexandra Aponte, Roberto Urbina	Drama	
El corazón de Jesús	Marcos Loayza			
2004
El atraco	Paolo Agazzi			
Los hijos del último jardín	Jorge Sanjinés			
2005
American Visa	Juan Carlos Valdivia			
Di buen día a papá	Fernando Vargas			
Sena/Quina, la inmortalidad del cangrejo	Paolo Agazzi			
Dioses domados	Enrique Aguilar			
Lo más bonito y mis mejores años	Martín Boulocq			
2006
¿Quién mató a la llamita blanca?	Rodrigo Bellott	Erika Andia, Pablo Fernandez, Augustin Mendieta, Guery Sandoval, Miguel Valverde	Comedy	
2007
Cocalero	Alejandro Landes			
Evo Pueblo	Tonchy Antezana			
Los Andes no creen en Dios	Antonio Eguino			
2008
Verse	Alejandro Pereyra			
Cementerio de Elefantes	Tonchy Antezana			
2009
Perfidia	Rodrigo Bellott			
Zona Sur	Juan Carlos Valdivia			
El regalo de Pachamama	Toshifumi Matsushita			
Rojo Amarillo Verde	Martin Boulocq, Sergio Bastani, Rodrigo Bellott	Patricia Garcia, Daniel Aguirre Camacho, Ismael Suárez, Diego Paesano, Lorena Sugier, Santiago Rozo		

== 2010s ==
Title	Director	Cast	Genre	Notes
2010
En Busca Del Paraiso				
2011
The Old People	Martín Boulocq			
2012
Insurgentes	Jorge Sanjinés			
Las bellas durmientes	Marcos Loayza			
2013
Once Upon a Time in Bolivia	Patrick Cordova	Luis Caballero, Miguel Angel Mamani, Ivan Nogales, Raul Beltran, Reynaldo Yuhra, Miguel Estellano	Drama	
El olor de tu ausencia	Eddy Vázquez			
Yvy Maraey	Juan Carlos Valdivia			
Olvidados	Carlos Bolado			
2015
Sealed Cargo	Julia Vargas-Weise			
2016
Dark Skull	Kiro Russo			
2017
Las Malcogidas	Denisse Arancibia			

== 2020s ==
Title	Director	Cast	Genre	Notes
2020
Chaco				
Pseudo	Rodrigo Patiño, Luis Reneo		Drama, Thriller	
2021
2022
The Ones from Below	Alejandro Quiroga	Fernando Arze Echalar, César Bordón, Luis Bredow, Sonia Parada	Western, Drama	
Utama	Alejandro Loayza Grisi	Luisa Quispe, José Calcina, Santos Choque	Drama	
The Visitor	Martín Boulocq	Enrique Araoz, Svet Mena, César Troncoso, Mirella Pascual, Teresa Gutierrez, Romel Vargas	Drama	
Willaq Pirqa, the Cinema of My Village	César Galindo	Víctor Acuario, Hermelinda Luján, Melisa Álvarez, Alder Yaurisaca, Cosme Flores, Bernando Rosado, Juan Ubaldo Huaman	Comedy-drama	
2024
The Dog Thief	Vinko Tomičić	Franklin Aro, Alfredo Castro, María Luque, Julio César Altamirano, Ninon Davalos, Teresa Ruiz, Kleber Aro Huasco, Vladimir Gonza Mamani, Jhoselyn Rosmery Cosme, Wolframio Sinué, Felix Francisco Omonte Vargas, Iván Cori Mamani, Raúl Montecinos Heredia	Drama	Nominated - Best International Narrative Feature at the 23rd Tribeca Film Festival Nominated - Best Ibero-American Fiction Feature Film at the Winner - New Actor - Special Mention for Franklin Aro at the 39th Guadalajara International Film Festival Nominated - CineVision Award at the 41st Filmfest München Nominated - Best Picture at the 28th Lima Film Festival Winner - Special Jury Prize at the 28th Lima Film Festival Nominated - Best Film in the International Competition at the 20th Santiago International Film Festival Nominated - Best Performance for Franklin Aro in the International Competition at the 20th Santiago International Film Festival Nominated - Best International Feature Film at the 61st Antalya Golden Orange Film Festival Winner - Best Director in the International Competition & Best Actor for Franklin Aro at the 61st Antalya Golden Orange Film Festival Nominated - Latin-American Competition - Best Film at the 39th Mar del Plata International Film Festival Nominated - Best Fiction Feature Film at the 45th Havana Film Festival Winner - Best Screenplay at the 45th Havana Film Festival Nominated - Best Latin-American Film at the 30th Forqué Awards Winner - Best Latin-American Film at the 28th Málaga Film Festival Nominated - MARIMBAS Award at the Miami Film Festival Winner - Best Ibero-American Debut Film at the 12th Platino Awards Nominated - Film and Values Education at the 12th Platino Awards Nominated - Best Ibero-American Film at the 67th Ariel Awards An international co-production with Ecuador, Chile, Mexico, France and Italy Premiered on October 17
Own Hand	Rodrigo Patiño	Alejandro Marañón, Freddy Chipana, Gonzalo Callejas, Christian Castillo, Raimundo Ramos, Victoria Suaznabar, Mauricio Toledo, Bernardo Rosado, Carlos Ureña	Thriller	
The Southern House	Carina Oroza Daroca, Ramiro Fierro	Grisel Quiroga, Piti Campos, Arwen Delaine, Alejandra Lanza, Cristian Mercado, David Mondacca	Drama	
2025
The Condor Daughter	Álvaro Olmos Torrico	María Magdalena Sanizo, Marisol Vallejos Montaño, Nely Huayta	Drama	Selected as the Bolivian entry for the Best International Feature Film at the 99th Academy Awards.
