= Cinema of Bolivia =

- No. of screens: 79 (2010)

Produced feature films (1924-1998)
- Total: 42

Gross box office (2009)
- Total: BOB 65,735,296

The Cinema of Bolivia comprises the film and videos made within the nation of Bolivia or by Bolivian filmmakers abroad. Though the country's film infrastructure is too small to be considered a film industry, Bolivia has a rich film history. Bolivia has consistently produced feature-length films since the 1920s, many of which are documentary or take a documentary approach to their subject. Film historian José Sánchez-H has observed that the predominant theme of many Bolivian films is the country's indigenous cultures and political oppression.

== History ==
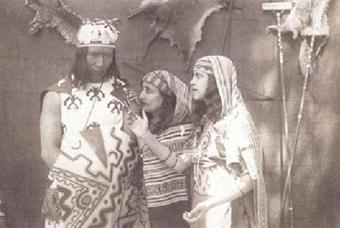
Wara Wara (1930)

The first motion picture was shown in Bolivia on June 21, 1897, probably on a Vitascope. The press paid more attention to "illicit acts" committed in the dark theater than to the pictures themselves, and authorities made it difficult to hold screenings, some of which were held in people's homes. The Biograph was introduced in 1899, and by 1905 popular exhibitions were held in La Paz. A wave of documentary films emerged in the 1910s and 1920s directed by pioneer multitalented filmmakers working in an artisanal mode. Of note is La Gloria de la Raza (1926), directed by Luis Castillo in collaboration with anthropologist Arturo Posnasky. Optical effects and miniature models were used to depict the decline and disappearance of Tiahuanaco culture, and the film helped to spur the formation of Condor Mayku Films.

The first motion picture made in Bolivia was Personajes históricos y de actualidad in 1904. The only surviving film from Bolivia's silent era is Wara Wara, directed by José Velasco Maidana in 1930. The first sound film was Infierno Verde (aka ''La Guerra del Chaco, 1936) directed by Luis Bazoberry. The first color film was Donde nace un imperio (1957) directed by Jorge Ruiz.

=== Instituto Cinematográfico Boliviano ===
The Instituto Cinematográfico Boliviano (ICB) was created in March 1953 to promote the government of Victor Paz Estenssoro in the wake of the national revolution of 1952. Waldo Cerruto was the ICB's first director. At the time, the government had a monopoly on film. The ICB created 136 newsreels between 1952 and 1956. In 1956, Jorge Ruiz became the next director of the ICB, and then was succeeded by Jorge Sanjinés in 1965. Two years later, the government shut the ICB down after Sanjinés exhibited his film Ukamau (1966), which authorities feared would incite Aymara people. Everyone involved with the film was fired, and the equipment and projects were transferred to Channel 7 - a station developed by the military government of General René Barrientos. Sanjinés and his crew founded a new group film, which they named after Ukamau.

=== New Bolivian Cinema ===
In the 1960s, Latin American cinema saw a common shift towards intellectualism and examining similar political themes, including underdevelopment and economic strife. Following Brazil's Cinema Novo and Argentina's Third cinema, New Bolivian Cinema sought to define a national identity. Ideologically, New Bolivian Cinema sought to make film for people together with people. The movement was a rejection of Hollywood style filmmaking, and is characterized by filming at real locations, working with non-professional actors, and inexpensive equipment. Jorge Sanjinés is considered a leader of the movement, with films like Yawar Malku (1969) and La Nación Clandestina (1989) which examined the historical and current treatment of Aymara peoples. Many filmmakers battled with both censorship by government authorities and mainstream media criticism within Bolivia, which attacked the films for their leftist social critiques and for focusing on indigenous peoples. For example, in 1953 Bolivian authorities tried to block Vuelve, Sebastiana from entering the Servicio Oficial de Difusión Radiotelevisión y Espectáculos film festival because “a movie about Indians couldn’t possibly represent Bolivia in a film festival in a foreign country.” However, the Bolivian Ambassador smuggled a copy of the film and entered it into the festival, where Vuelve, Sebastiana won first prize in the festival's ethnographic category.

=== Law of Bolivian Film ===
In 1991 the Bolivian government passed a law establishing the Consejo Nacional Autónomo del Cine (CONACINE). The council's film development fund lends "up to one hundred thousand dollars for the production of films at a 7% interest rate and with only two years to pay it back." Filmmaker Jorge Ruiz felt the law was not applied effectively, and it remains difficult to secure the basic funds for film production in Bolivia.

=== Digital era ===
Bolivian cinema transformed with the advent of digital formats. Computer-based editing allowed smaller, cheaper productions to be made. This led to a jump from an average of two feature-length movies a year being produced to over a dozen in 2010. Though production budgets can be much lower than in the past, independent filmmakers still have to make sacrifices to fund their projects. Patrick Cordova, writer, director, and producer of Erase una ves en Bolivia had to sell his car to finish the film. Many of the films made are still about socialist realism, but there are also genre films and auteur cinema. Notable directors include Juan Carlos Valdivia, Eduardo López, and Alejandro Pereyra.

Accessible formats have also allowed Bolivia to foster a strong indigenous film community. The Cinematography Education and Production Center (CEFREC) is an organization dedicated to promoting film and video production among indigenous nations in Bolivia. Ian Sanjinés, Jorge Sanjinés’ son, founded the Center in 1989. CEFREC offers technical training in sound, film production, post-production, and script writing for the indigenous nations of Ayamara, Guarani, Trinitatio and Quechua. One of the indigenous filmmakers involved with CEFREC explains, “Video serves as a medium to save that which our grandparents can no longer tell.”

== Feature length films ==
- Corazón aymara (Aymara heart, 1925)
- La profecía del lago (The prophecy of the lake, 1925)
- El centenario de Bolivia (Bolivia's centennial, 1925)
- La gloria de la raza (The glory of the race, 1926)
- Wara-Wara (Aymara for "stars", 1929)
- Hacia la gloria (Towards glory, 1932)
- La campaña del Chaco (The Chaco campaign, 1933)
- Infierno verde (Green hell, 1936)
- Al pie del Illimani (At the feet of the Illimani, 1948)
- Detrás de los Andes (Behind the Andes, 1954)
- La vertiente (The spring, 1958)
- Ukamau (Aymara for "That's the way it is", 1966)
- Mina Alaska (Alaska mine, 1968)
- Yawar Malku (Blood of the Condor, 1969)
- Volver (To return, 1969)
- Viaje a la independencia por los caminos de la muerte (A trip to independence by the paths of death, 1970)
- Crimen sin olvido (Unforgotten crime, 1970)
- El coraje del pueblo (The Courage of the People, 1971)
- Patria linda (Beautiful country, 1972)
- El enemigo principal (The Principle Enemy, 1973)
- Pueblo chico (Small town, 1974)
- Señores generales, señores coroneles (Gentlemen generals, gentlemen colonels, 1976)
- La chaskañawi (Quechua for The woman with eyes like the morning star, 1976)
- Chuquiago (Aymara name for La Paz, 1977)
- Fuera de aquí (Get out of here, 1977)
- Los octavos juegos deportivos bolivarianos (The Eighth Bolivarian Sports Games, 1978)
- El embrujo de mi tierra (The bewitching of my country, 1978)
- El lago sagrado (The sacred lake, 1981)
- El celibato (Celibacy, 1981)
- Mi socio (My partner, 1982)
- Las banderas del amanecer (The flags of dawn, 1983)
- Amargo mar (Bitter sea, 1984)
- Los hermanos cartagena (The Cartagena brothers, 1985)
- Tinku, el encuentro (Tinku, the encounter, 1985)
- La nación clandestina (The Hidden Nation, 1989)
- Los igualitarios (The egalitarians, 1990)
- Viva Bolivia toda la vida (Long live Bolivia always, 1994)
- Para recibir el canto de los pájaros (To receive the song of the birds, 1995)
- Jonás y la ballena rosada (Jonah and the pink whale, 1995)
- Cuestión de fé (A matter of faith, 1995)
- Sayariy (Quechua for “Get up”, 1995)
- La oscuridad radiante (The shining darkness, 1996)
- El día que murió el silencio (The Day Silence Died, 1998)
- Escrito en el agua (Ever Changing Waters, 1998)
- Verse (Verse, 2009)
- La Hija Cóndor (The Condor Daughter, 2025)

== Notable directors ==
- Violeta Ayala
- Beatriz Azurduy Palacios
- Luis Castillo
- Alfonso Gumucio Dagron
- Yashira Jordán
- José María Velasco Maidana
- Jorge Sanjinés
- Ivan Sanjinés
