= List of Bolivian submissions for the Academy Award for Best International Feature Film =

Best International Feature Film submissions from Bolivia

Highlights
- Debut: 1995
- Submissions: 19
- Nominations: none
- Oscar winners: none

Bolivia has submitted films for the Academy Award for Best International Feature Film (Note: The category was previously named the Academy Award for Best Foreign Language Film, but this was changed to the Academy Award for Best International Feature Film in April 2019, after the Academy deemed the word "Foreign" to be outdated.) since 1995. The award is handed out annually by the United States Academy of Motion Picture Arts and Sciences to a feature-length motion picture produced outside the United States that contains primarily non-English dialogue. It was not created until the 1956 Academy Awards, in which a competitive Academy Award of Merit, known as the Best Foreign Language Film Award, was created for non-English speaking films, and has been given annually since.

As of 2026, Bolivia has submitted nineteen films, but none of them were nominated.

== Submissions ==
The Academy of Motion Picture Arts and Sciences has invited the film industries of various countries to submit their best film for the Academy Award for Best International Feature Film since 1956. The International Feature Film Committee oversees the process and reviews all the submitted films. Following this, they vote via secret ballot to determine the five nominees for the award.

The Bolivian submission is designated by the Asociación de Cineastas Bolivianos (Asocine).

Juan Carlos Valdivia is the most submitted filmmaker with three films selected. Legendary Bolivian filmmaker Jorge Sanjinés only had one film submitted, Insurgents (2012), but it was withdrawn shortly before the voting process.

Say Good Morning to Dad (2005) and Los Andes no creen en Dios (2007) were both disqualified.

All films are spoken primarily in Spanish or native local languages, Aymara and Quechua. Below is a list of the films that have been submitted by Bolivia for review by the academy for the award by year and the respective Academy Awards ceremony.

Year (Ceremony)	Film title used in nomination	Original title	Language(s)	Director(s)	Result
1995 (68th)	Jonah and the Pink Whale	Jonás y la ballena rosada	Spanish	Juan Carlos Valdivia	Not nominated
2003 (76th)	Sexual Dependency	Dependencia sexual	Spanish, English	Rodrigo Bellott	Not nominated
2005 (78th)	Say Good Morning to Dad^{[A]}	Di buen día a papá	Spanish	Fernando Vargas	Disqualified
2006 (79th)	American Visa		Spanish	Juan Carlos Valdivia	Not nominated
2007 (80th)	Los Andes no creen en Dios^{[B]}		Spanish	Antonio Eguino	Disqualified
2009 (82nd)	Zona Sur		Spanish, Aymara	Juan Carlos Valdivia	Not nominated
2012 (85th)	Insurgents	Insurgentes	Spanish, Aymara, Quechua	Jorge Sanjinés	Withdrawn
2014 (87th)	Forgotten	Olvidados	Spanish	Carlos Bolado	Not nominated
2016 (89th)	Sealed Cargo	Carga Sellada	Spanish	Julia Vargas-Weise	Not nominated
2017 (90th)	Dark Skull	Viejo calavera	Spanish	Kiro Russo	Not nominated
2018 (91st)	The Goalkeeper	Muralla	Spanish	Rodrigo Patiño	Not nominated
2019 (92nd)	Tu me manques		Spanish, English	Rodrigo Bellott	Not nominated
2020 (93rd)	Chaco		Aymara, Quechua, Spanish	Diego Mondaca	Not nominated
2021 (94th)	The Great Movement	El Gran Movimiento	Spanish	Kiro Russo	Not nominated
2022 (95th)	Utama		Quechua, Spanish	Alejandro Loayza Grisi	Not nominated
2023 (96th)	The Visitor	El visitante	Spanish	Martín Boulocq	Not nominated
2024 (97th)	Own Hand	Mano propia	Spanish	Rodrigo Patiño	Not nominated
2025 (98th)	The Southern House	La casa del sur	Spanish	Carina Oroza Daroca and Ramiro Fierro	Not nominated
2026 (99th)	The Condor Daughter	La Hija Cóndor	Quechua, Spanish	Álvaro Olmos Torrico	Pending

== See also ==
- List of Academy Award winners and nominees for Best International Feature Film
- List of Academy Award-winning foreign language films

== Notes ==
- ^{A} Bolivia's submission to the 78th Academy Awards, Say Good Morning to Dad, was disqualified because it did not arrive at the academy on time.
- ^{B} Bolivia submitted Los Andes no creen en Dios for review by the academy at the 80th Academy Awards, but it did not appear on the list of official submissions.
