= Luís Espinal Camps =

Spanish-Bolivian journalist (1932–1980)

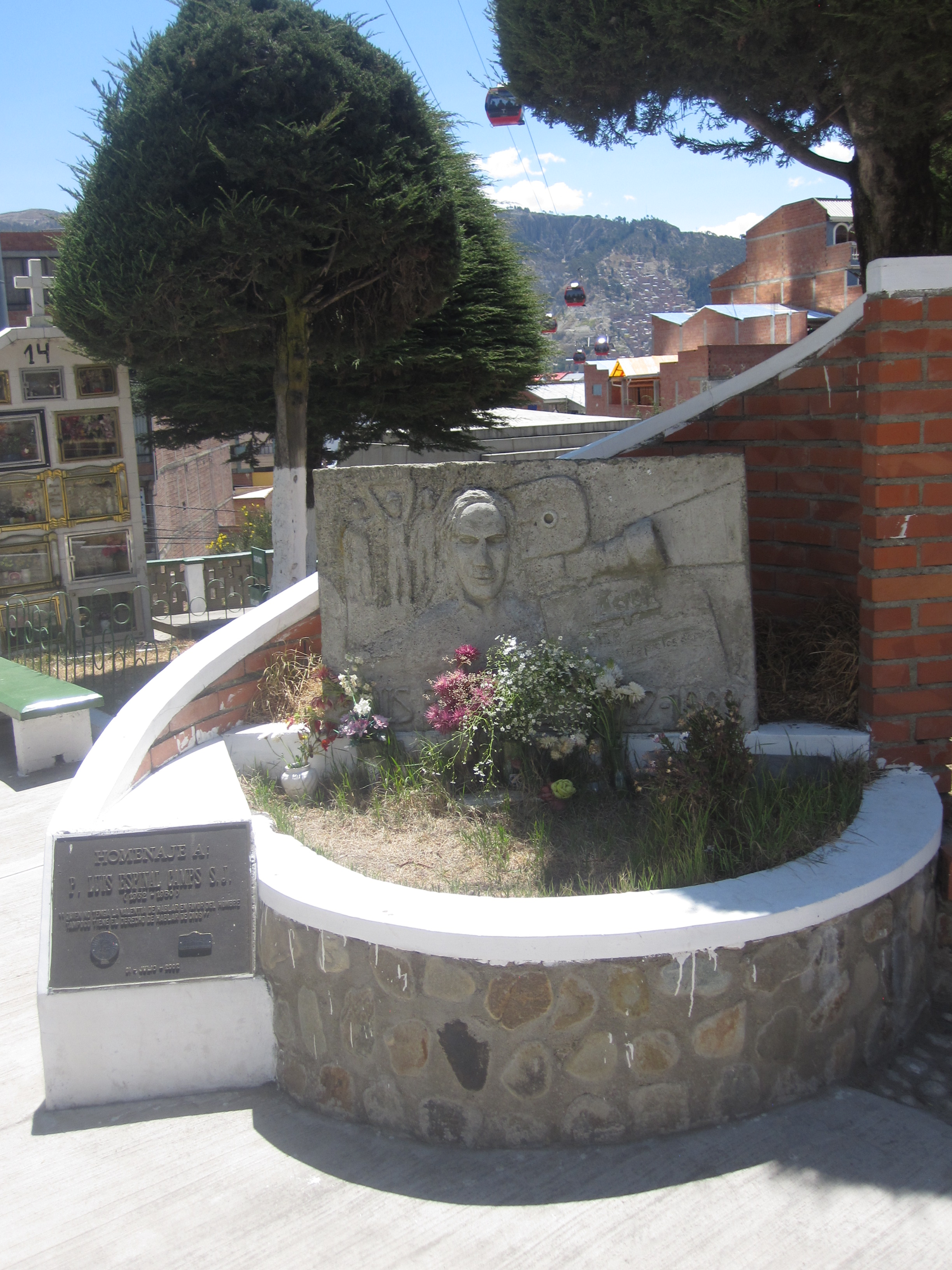
- Born: 2 February 1932; Sant Fruitós de Bages, Spain
- Died: 21 March 1980 (aged 48); La Paz, Bolivia
- Other names: Lucho Espinal; Lluís Espinal i Camps
- Occupations: Jesuit priest, poet, journalist, filmmaker, film critic
- Years active: 1962-1980

Luís Espinal Camps (Note: Spanish pronunciation: [ˈlwis espiˈnal ˈkambs]) (2 February 1932 – 21 March 1980), also known by the nickname Lucho (Note: Spanish pronunciation: [ˈlut͡ʃo]) and by the Catalan name Lluís Espinal i Camps (Note: Catalan pronunciation: [ʎuˈiz əspiˈnal i ˈkams]), was a Spanish Jesuit priest, poet, journalist, filmmaker, and film critic.

== Background ==
Luís Espinal Camps was born on 2 February 1932 in Sant Fruitós de Bages, Catalonia, Spain. He aspired to be a priest even as a child. Espinal was educated at the minor seminary of San Jose in Roquetes, Baix Ebre between 1944 and 1949. He joined the Society of Jesus of Veruela, Zaragoza in 1949, made his perpetual vows in 1951, and studied Humanities and Greco-Roman Literature (1951–53) there. He studied Philosophy at the Facultad Eclesiástica of San Cugat del Vallés from 1953 to 1956. While doing another licenciate course in Philosophy at the Universidad Civil de Barcelona, Espinal gave classes of Greek literature and Latin poetry to Jesuits. He studied Theology (1959–63) at the Facultad Eclesiástica of San Cugat del Vallés, and was ordained priest in 1962. He later obtained a degree in film and television from the Italian Università Cattolica del Sacro Cuore (1964–65).

== Career ==
In 1968, Espinal moved to La Paz, Bolivia, as a missionary. There, he lived alongside the families of miners during the dictatorship of Luis García Meza. Becoming a human-rights activist, he co-founded the Permanent Assembly for Human Rights. He gained Bolivian citizenship in 1970.

Beyond priest and activist, Espinal was also a poet, journalist, and filmmaker.

He had worked for a brief period in Spanish television. In December 1967, he left Spain in protest against Francisco Franco's dictatorship censorship of him and his program channel, TVE. In Bolivia, he directed the social issues-themed Cuestión urgente ("Urgent Issue"). In Bolivia, he directed a similar program, En carne viva (lit. "In living flesh"), a series of 20-minute documentaries for Televisión Boliviana (TVB). The show lasted from 1970 to 1971, when Espinal was sent off from TVB because he interviewed the Ñancahuazú Guerrilla.

Espinal was a film professor at the Higher University of San Andrés and the Universidad Católica Boliviana, and worked for Radio Fides. Espinal was a film critic for the newspapers Presencia, Última hora and Aquí, a member of film company Ukamu, and author of ten books on cinema. He was one of the most informed critics of film, television and radio in the country.

== Death ==
In 1980, a Bolivian-government death squad murdered Espinal in La Paz.

In the headquarters of the newspaper Presencia Espinal joined a December 1977 hunger strike led by Domitila Chúngara, requesting amnesty for exiled labour and political leaders. Espinal was killed by a right-wing paramilitary death squad in March 1980. He was kidnapped by the paramilitaries on 21 March and was tortured. His bounded and gagged body was only found by peasants the next day on the road to Chacaltaya. Some sources say Espinal was killed because he would publicize the cocaine traffic done by military personnel. Other say that the reason was that he informed against efforts to censor a public exhibition of Jorge Sanjinés's film El coraje del pueblo, a documentary that denounced the massacre of 67.

== Legacy ==
Espinal's funeral on March 24 was reportedly attended by over 7,000 people in a manifestation against the regime. A posthumous book written by Espinal, Oraciones a quemarropa (lit. "Point-blank Prayers"), was published containing his poetic prose and prayers. In his homage, the Catalonia's Society of Jesus created the Luis Espinal Camps Foundation. For Espinal's contribution to cinema and human rights, Morales declared in 2007 the "Bolivian Cinema Day" to be commemorated on 21 March. In 1982, Bolivian historian Carlos Mesa published the book El cine boliviano según Luis Espinal. Bolivian writer Alfonso Gumucio Dagron wrote a biography of Espinal in 1985. The 2007 documentary Lucho: Gastar la vida por los demais, directed by Nelson Martínez, explored the life of Espinal.

In 1985, the song "A Luis Espinal" appeared on their debut album El Huerto by the Bolivian group Rumisonko, based in Washington, DC.

In July 2015, Pope Francis visited the site where Espinal was killed. Espinal gained international notoriety as the author of a crucifix that incorporated the hammer and sickle after Bolivian president Evo Morales gave a replica of it to Pope Francis. The Pope said the Jesuit "preached the Gospel, the Gospel that bothered them, and because of this they got rid of him". Vatican representative Frederico Lombardi said that the object stands for open dialogue and his commitment to freedom. However, Espinal's friend, Xavier Albó, said it symbolised that the Church should be in dialogue with Marxism, peasants and miners.

== Filmography ==
=== Films ===
- Bartolomeo Colleoni (1966) – assistant director, assistant editor
- Noche iluminada (1966) – writer
- Pistolas para la paz (1969) – director, writer
- Sangre en el Chaco (1974) – writer
- Chuquiago (1977) – writer
- Qué hacemos (1977) – writer
- El embrujo de mi tierra (1978) – writer
- La Guerra del Pacífico (1979) – writer

=== Television ===
- En carne viva (1970–1971) segments:
  - La Cárcel
  - La prostitución
  - La droga
  - La violencia
  - Inmigración
  - Hijos sin nombre
  - Educación sexual
  - Madre soltera
  - Alcoholismo
  - Sacerdotes obreros
  - Delincuencia juvenil
  - Inferioridad femenina
