= The Goalkeeper (2018 film) =

2018 film

Muralla
- Film poster
- Directed by: Rodrigo Patiño
- Written by: Rodrigo Patiño
- Starring: Juan Carlos Aduviri
- Release date: 22 September 2018
- Running time: 90 minutes
- Country: Bolivia
- Language: Spanish

The Goalkeeper (Spanish: Muralla) is a 2018 Bolivian thriller film directed by Rodrigo Patiño. It was selected as the Bolivian entry for the Best Foreign Language Film at the 91st Academy Awards, but it was not nominated.

== Cast ==
- Juan Carlos Aduviri as Quispe
- Luis Aduviri as Aparapita
- Erika Andia as Dueña del hostal.
- Fernando Arze as Jorge

== See also ==
- List of submissions to the 91st Academy Awards for Best Foreign Language Film
- List of Bolivian submissions for the Academy Award for Best Foreign Language Film
