= José María Velasco =

José María Velasco may refer to:

- José María Velasco Gómez (1840–1912), Mexican painter
- José María Velasco Ibarra (1893–1979), president of Ecuador
- José María Velasco Maidana (c. 1899–1989) Bolivian film director and artist
- Temascalcingo, officially Temascalcingo de José María Velasco, a municipality in the State of Mexico
- José María Velasco (Mexico City Metrobús), a BRT station in Mexico City
