= The Great Movement =

2021 film by Kiro Russo

- Film poster
- Directed by: Kiro Russo
- Screenplay by: Kiro Russo
- Produced by: Kiro Russo; Pablo Paniagua; Alexa Rivero
- Starring: Julio Cézar Ticona; Max Eduardo Bautista Uchasara; Francisca Arce de Aro; Israel Hurtado; Gustavo Milán
- Cinematography: Pablo Paniagua
- Edited by: Felipe Gálvez Haberle; Pablo Paniagua; Kiro Russo
- Music by: Miguel Llanque
- Production companies: Socavón; Altamar Films
- Release dates: September 6, 2021 (Venice); 2022 (Bolivia)
- Running time: 85 minutes
- Countries: Bolivia; France; Qatar; Switzerland
- Language: Spanish

The Great Movement (Spanish: El Gran Movimiento) is a 2021 drama film written, directed and co-produced by Kiro Russo. The film had its world premiere at the 78th Venice International Film Festival on September 6, 2021 and is set to be released in theaters in 2022. It was selected as the Bolivian entry for the Best International Feature Film at the 94th Academy Awards, but it was not nominated.

== Plot ==
In present-day Bolivia, Elder takes a week-long walk to La Paz alongside his young miner friends to demand a reinstatement of their job. However, Elder suddenly falls ill, causing him to suffer frequent choking and shortness of breath after having found work in a local market. As his condition gets worse, he enlists the help of the elderly Mamá Pancha, who sends him to Max – a homeless witch doctor, hermit, and clown – who could have the ability to bring Elder back to life.

== Cast ==
- Julio Cézar Ticona as Elder
- Max Eduardo Bautista Uchasara as Max
- Francisca Arce de Aro as Mamá Pancha
- Israel Hurtado as Gallo
- Gustavo Milán as Gato

== Production ==
On November 28, 2016, it was announced that Bolivian filmmaker Kiro Russo was developing Shewolf, a follow-up feature to his acclaimed directorial debut Dark Skull. Russo said that the film was set to be "a little more narrative" than Dark Skull "with comic and dramatic elements". The project was set to receive support from the Cannes Film Festival and the Mar del Plata International Film Festival.

Principal photography took place from April to November 2019 in La Paz, Bolivia and was shot entirely in Super 16 mm film. By November 2020, the film was completed under the redeveloped title El Gran Movimiento, with the film backed by the Doha Film Institute.

== Release ==
The film had its world premiere at the 78th Venice International Film Festival on September 6, 2021, competing in the Horizons section. Following its festival run, the film is set to be released theatrically in 2022. On July 27, 2021, it was announced that Best Friend Forever, a Brussels-based sister company of French sales agent Indie Sales, was set to handle international sales for the film.

The film has also been officially invited in 'Harbour' section at the 51st International Film Festival Rotterdam to be held from January 26 to February 6, 2022. In December, 2022, the film was awarded the first prize Grand Coral for Best Feature Film at the 43rd International Film Festival of New Latin American Cinema in Havana.

== See also ==
- List of submissions to the 94th Academy Awards for Best International Feature Film
- List of Bolivian submissions for the Academy Award for Best International Feature Film
