= Luis Espinal =

Luis Espinal may refer to:

- Luís Espinal Camps (1932–1980), Spanish Jesuit priest, poet, journalist and filmmaker
- Luis Espinal (footballer) (born 1994), Dominican footballer
