= List of film manifestos =

There have been a number of manifestos related to film. These propose the author/s feelings and briefing on the how and why of film:

Manifesto	Author/s	Defining features	Example films
Antonioni Manifesta, The	Davell Swan	Given that Michelangelo Antonioni expresses the maximum cinema data through the most minimal means, and that in cinema, as in architecture, interior and industrial design, less is more, Antonioni is postmodernism's incipient master.	"L'Avventura" (The Adventure, 1960) "Il Deserto Rosso" (The Red Desert, 1964)
Dogme 95	Lars von Trier, Thomas Vinterberg, Kristian Levring, and Søren Kragh-Jacobsen	The goal of the Dogme collective is to purify filmmaking by refusing expensive and spectacular special effects, postproduction modifications and other gimmicks. The emphasis on purity forces the filmmakers to focus on the actual story and on the actors' performances.	The Celebration (Original title "Festen", Denmark, 1998) The Idiots (Original title "Idioterne", Denmark, 1998)
Futurist Cinema	Marinetti, Bruno Corra, Emilio Settimelli, Arnaldo Ginna, Giacomo Balla, Remo Chiti	Aimed to, "...free the cinema as an expressive medium in order to make it the ideal instrument of a new art, immensely vaster and lighter than all the existing arts."	
Free Cinema	Lorenza Mazzetti, Lindsay Anderson, Tony Richardson, Karel Reisz	Was about taking cameras out onto the streets to try to capture a naturalistic and unscripted look.	O Dreamland by Lindsay Anderson (1953)
Hitchcock Manifesto, The	The HitchCult Collective	"Alfred Hitchcock is not the Master of Suspense," according to this manifesto published in May 2013 in CineSource Magazine "but simply The Master." Penned largely by Davell Swan, who did a four-part analysis of The Master's "Vertigo" one year before England's Sight and Sound magazine proclaimed it the greatest film of all time, he goes on to note, "Although The Master's investigation of evil... accesses the romantic paradigm through its underbelly... about the final triumph of good, The Master remained romantic."	"Shadow of a Doubt", Alfred Hitchcock (Hollywood, California, 1943) "Spellbound", Alfred Hitchcock (Hollywood, California, 1945) "Dial M for Murder", Alfred Hitchcock (London, England, 1954)
Oakland Stammer WoManifesto, The	Doniphan Blair	The Film Stammer movement moves, as it were, that we drop all genre and technical as well as racial and gender structures, and dive full-throatedly into filmmaking for the postmodern era.	"Everything Strange and New", Frazer Bradshaw (Oakland, California, 2009)
Oberhausen Manifesto	Alexander Kluge, Edgar Reitz	A call to establish a new West German Cinema.	
On the Art of the Cinema	Kim Jong-il	Juche oriented cinema conforms to aesthetic guidelines delineated by the state. Artistic creation exists only to serve the state.	The Five Guerrilla Brothers, The Flower Girl, The Sea of Blood, We Are the Happiest
Pluginmanifesto	Ana Kronschnabl	The pluginmanifesto is a document written by Ana Kronschnabl that looks at the challenges for filmmaking for the internet and other reduced bandwidth platforms, such as mobile phones, PDAs and PlayStation Portables.	'Distance Over Time' -
Revolución Rasquache: A Manifesto for the Guerrilla Filmmaker	Rafael Flores and the Green Eyed Media Collective	These filmmakers, largely of Latino heritage, "Challenge our likeminded 'rasquachistas' to revive their own cultural and aesthetic traditions, to invent new forms of communication and to combat oppressive political agendas in Hollywood". In their stripped down style and budgeting, Rasquachistas homage Dogma. In his astute, academic article on the subject, "Chicano Third Cinema", Flores explains why this is important: "Chicano filmmakers endorsed these revolutionary concepts and dedicated themselves to fight for fundamental changes in the power and organizational structures of the film industry... [but] this political stance and call for autonomy from Hollywood was abandoned as Chicano filmmakers became less concerned with independent filmmaking and focused more on trying to penetrate commercial mainstream venues; in particular, television."	"Raices de Sangre", Jesus Trevino (Los Angeles, California, 1978) "El Mariachi", Robert Rodriguez (Texas, 1992)
Problems of Form and Content in Revolutionary Cinema	Jorge Sanjinés	In this Third Cinema manifesto, Sanjinés challenges Hollywood's auteur cinema and instead suggests a different style of filmmaking, using a collective protagonist instead of an individual. This new style of Cinema is referred to as a way of spreading revolutionary ideas by giving voice to those who typically are under-represented: "The peasants used the filming to break the silence of oppression and speak openly". A Marxist, Sanjinés repeatedly makes clear the importance of taking this revolutionary stance on cinema.	Yawar Mallku, or Blood of the Condor, Jorge Sanjinés (Bolivia, 1969), El coraje del pueblo, or The Courage of the People, Jorge Sanjinés (Bolivia, 1971), El enemigo principal, or The Principal Enemy, Jorge Sanjinés (Peru, 1974)
yGroup Manifesto, The	The yGroup, Rob Nilsson	Using the workshopping method of Direct Action developed by Rob Nilsson in the mid-'80s, the yGroup brought a largely-improvised film style to the people and the streets, the rough and tumble Tenderloin neighborhood in San Francisco, where the class met, almost every Tuesday for almost fourteen years. According to the manifesto, written in 1985 but signed August 12, 1998: "There can be no cinema outside the artist’s inner life... The collaboration of artists... writers, directors, actors, cinematographers and craft people of all kinds is given shape and energy by the kinetic release of the inner fountain... Whereas the pale and anemic truth that ‘all art is political’ has spawned legions of nodding heads in the exclusive pews of race, gender and class... the living truth is that there can be no art without vision... [o]riginating in shamanic practice, in the ‘wild surmises’ of poets and sages." The manifesto concludes with: "We pledge ourselves as individuals to the communal circle of risk and protection where we reveal our secrets, power up our energy, open flesh and intuitive mind to received vision... to live with passion and to sing at the top of our lungs."	"Chalk", 1996 The eight other "9 @ Night" Films (San Francisco, 2000–09)

== See also ==
- Postmodernist film
- Vulgar auteurism
- Film theory
