= Guillermo Viscarra Fabre =

Bolivian author, poet and pacifist

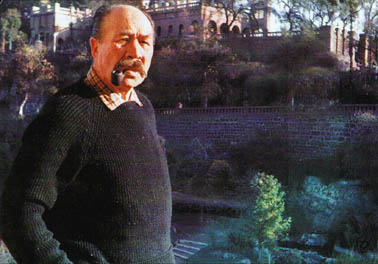

Guillermo Viscarra Fabre (June 23, 1900, in Sorata – 1980 in La Paz) was a Bolivian author, poet and pacifist.

== Biography ==
Viscarra Fabre was born and grew up in the village of Sorata, son of Francisco Viscarra and Carmela Fabre. He was one of Bolivia's most known poet and author during the 19th century. He wrote several books and anthologies during his lifetime. He also appeared in Bolivia's first silent film Wara Wara (1930).

== Bibliography ==
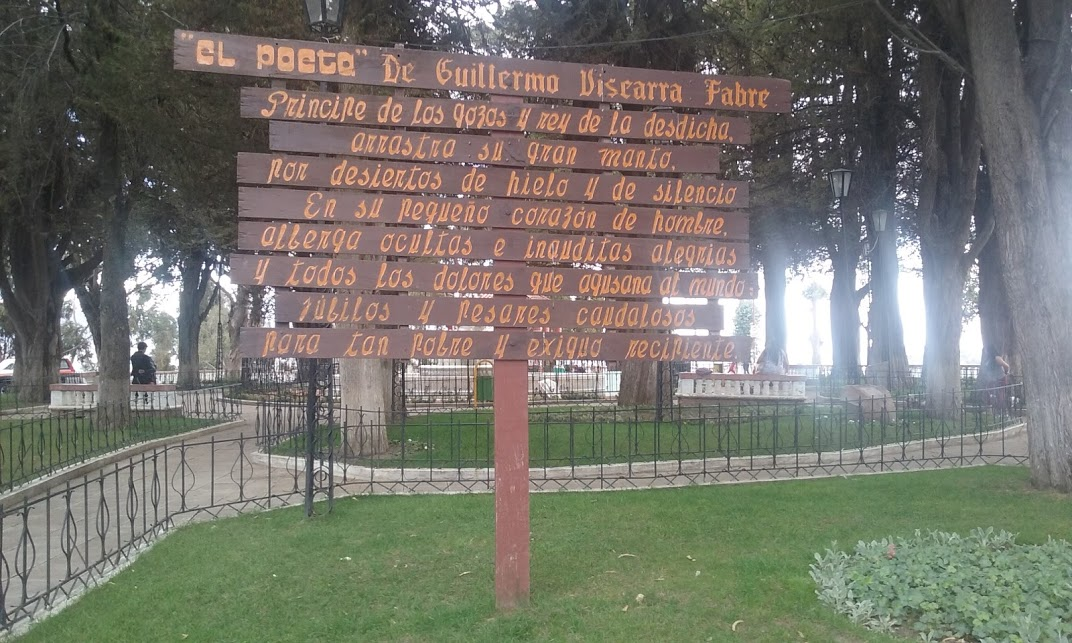
Fragment from "El Poeta" in the Monticulo park in La Paz.

- 1916 – Halcón
- 1926 – Aruma
- 1926 – Los más mejores versos de los más peores poetas
- 1938 – Clima.
- 1941 – Poetas nuevos de Bolivia – La Paz
- 1949 – Criatura del Alba
- 1966 – Nubladas nupcias
- 1970 – El jardín de Nilda
- 1974 – Cordillera de sangre
- 1975 – Andes. Editorial Universitaria: Santiago – Chile
- 1975 – Antología del cuento chileno-boliviano. Editorial Universitaria: Santiago – Chile

== Filmography ==
- 1930 – Wara Wara
