= Dorothy Hood =

American painter

Dorothy Rose Hood
- Born: August 22, 1918; Bryan, Texas, US
- Died: October 28, 2000 (aged 81); Houston, Texas, US
- Education: Rhode Island School of Design; Art Students League of New York; José Clemente Orozco (mentor)
- Occupation: Painter
- Movement: Modernism
- Spouse: José María Velasco Maidana
- Awards: Childe Hassam Award 1973; Lifetime Achievement Award, Women's Caucus for Art 1988

Dorothy Hood (August 22, 1918 – October 28, 2000) was an American painter in the Modernist tradition. Her work is held in private collections and at several museums, most notably the Museum of Modern Art and Museum of Fine Arts, Houston. Her preferred mediums were oil paint and ink.

== Early life ==
Hood was born in Bryan, Texas and raised in Houston. She was an only child. Hood was of German and Swedish descent, and experienced a strict, Episcopalian upbringing. Her father was a banker who often traveled out of town on business. Hood's mother encouraged Dorothy to pursue her artistic talents, but Dorothy was raised mainly by household servants due to her mother's mental illness that resulted in long sanitarium stays. Hood would visit her mother at the sanitarium on school breaks. Hood's mother held Victorian ideals of womanhood, yet had an unconventional side which led Hood to wonder about which side was her true mother. As a child, she experienced a lingering feeling of isolation. During the time in which she grew up, children were expected to remain out of the way of adults; without siblings, Hood was often left on her own. She often spent her vacations at vacation spas, an activity usually reserved for adults. Her parents' subsequent divorce led Hood to take "refuge in drawing."

== Education and early career ==
In high school, an art teacher submitted her work to a competition and she won a National Scholastic Scholarship. Hood went to the Rhode Island School of Design on this four-year scholarship in the early 1930s. Afterwards, she took classes at the Art Students League of New York, and earned money working as a model. Her time as a model influenced her to enjoy wearing fanciful clothing and to carry herself with poise, which she was later known for. She did not feel that her formal education was sufficient for her development as an artist other than providing her with an introduction to great art and other students.

Hood went to Mexico on what was intended to be a short vacation. She immediately fell in love with the country and its intellectual climate and aesthetic, and ended up spending twenty years in Mexico (1941-1961). There, she befriended many European and Mexican artists and intellectuals. They adopted her into their circle, and Hood, for the first time, developed the types of friendships she had longed for as a child. During this time, she was part of a group of intellectuals who were interested in critiquing the world around them. Her friends and acquaintances at the time included novelist Ramon Sender, playwright Sophie Treadwell, and painters Remedios Varo and Leonora Carrington. She was considered to be good friends with Treadwell. She also associated with writer Luis Buñuel and artists Miguel Covarrubias, Rufino Tamayo, Diego Rivera, and Frida Kahlo. Hood stayed for a time with Frida Kahlo and Diego Rivera, and had a spat with them because of a dispute that Sophie Treadwell had with Rivera, although Hood later regretted not trying to reach out to Rivera more. It was in Mexico that Hood began her career as an artist. She lived in meager conditions in Mexico, and her works were small in size, due in part to her small studio space. She experimented with anti-war drawings during the Spanish Civil War. Mayan and Aztec hieroglyphs were central to Hood's art in her early career. In Mexico, Hood was met with more respect as a woman artist, and her drawings were sought after.

As Orozco said to me in moral tones of integrity 'tell the truth, Dorothy, no matter what the cost.'

So the truth was myself, recognizing myself should the results be beautiful or ugly, dark or light, assertive or peaceful.

—Dorothy Hood

Hood exhibited in 1941 at the Gama Gallery in Mexico City, which was commemorated in a poem written by Pablo Neruda, who introduced Hood to the artist and her ultimate mentor, José Clemente Orozco. This exhibition reflected the influence Mexico had on her art and featured oil and gouache paintings of animals, children, and portraits. Hood returned to New York for a year's study in 1945. This trip also provided her with the opportunity to visit with some of her Mexican friends who had more knowledgeable cultural backgrounds than she did. While in New York, Hood was gifted a copy of After Picasso, a book by James Thrall Soby, an author, critic, and patron, by a Texan neighbor of Soby's. John McAndrews, the curator of architecture at the Museum of Modern Art and a friend of Hood's, showed one of her drawings to Soby. Soby displayed the drawing in his office, and included it in a traveling exhibition. In 1950, Hood was awarded a solo show at the Willard Gallery in New York. Hoping to break into the New York art world, Hood rented a room near the Columbia University campus, where she invited curators and gallery owners to view her art. Marian Willard visited Hood's showroom on the last day and was impressed with Hood's art, winning Hood the solo show at the Willard Gallery. Willard proved to be an invaluable connection, and introduced Hood to Mark Tobey, a painter, collector, and patron who Hood admired. Tobey invited Hood to show at the Ahrensberg Atelier, of which he was the director. There she met European artists and art dealers.

== Career ==
Hood was considered a "pioneer modernist." Her work was a historical link between Mexican synthetic surrealism and the American Color Field School. Hood was one of the first abstract surrealists. Her paintings, which often refer to natural events, are noted by their large color areas. Her art also references her Texan roots with expansive imagery and sweeps of color indicative of the southwest. Hood was influenced by mythology, science and spirituality. Her work was particularly inspired by Taoism and the Yogi of Sri Aurobinda, as well asl by space exploration and outer space, which is reflected in her later works. She has cited the influence of Max Ernst on her work. Gorky, Brancusi, Ensor, Matisse, and Rendon, along with studies of science, nature, myths, and spirituality have all been referenced by Hood as influences. Travel also influenced her work, as she traveled between Latin America, New York, Europe, Africa, and Houston throughout her life.

Her first exhibition took place in Mexico City at the Gama Gallery in 1941. Her work consisted of realist portraits and depictions of animals. Hood had a one-person show at the Marian Williard Gallery in New York City. One of her drawings featured in an exhibit at the Museum of Modern Art in 1945. Throughout the 1950s, Hood's art evolved from its realist and surrealist roots into modern, abstract patterns of color. Her style was called "abstract surrealism." In 1957, Art in America named her one of the year's new talents. Hood had a solo show at the Duveen-Graham Gallery in New York in 1958, and showed at the Philadelphia Art Alliance that same year.

By 1961, many of her friends had either died or moved away, and Mexico no longer felt the same for Hood. Upon her return to Houston that year, she showed at the Atelier Chapman Kelley in Dallas. Starting in 1961, she taught at the School of Art of the Museum of Fine Arts, Houston. She mentored painter Ibsen Espada, who worked in her studio as a personal assistant. Hood focused her teaching efforts on meeting the needs of her students, something she felt was lacking from her formal art education. One year after her return to Houston, she began to show her work in the Meredith Long Gallery. She also taught at the Museum of Fine Arts until 1976. In 1976, she taught at Colorado State University.

The 1970s saw Hood's career take off. In 1970, an exhibition of her work was held at the Contemporary Arts Museum in Houston, Texas. Rice University featured Hood's work in a 1971 exhibition. She had five one-person shows in major Texas museums by 1971 and won the Childe Hassam Award in 1973. The following year, a retrospective of her work traveled the United States, which exposed her work to a greater audience of collectors and clients. This 1974 exhibition was arranged by the Everson Museum in Syracuse, New York. In 1975, Hood was tasked with creating the sets for "Allen's Landing" for the bicentennial celebration of the Houston Ballet. That same year, Hood showed at the Art Museum of South Texas in Corpus Christi. In 1976, the Royal Ontario Museum in Toronto commissioned Hood to create the sets for their showing of "Royal Hunt of the Sun". A Toronto gallery, The Marianne Friedland Gallery, showed Hood's work at the time she was commissioned by the Royal Ontario Museum. That same year, Hood's work was exhibited at the Kunsthalle in Dusseldorf. In 1978, the McNay Art Museum in San Antonio held a showing of Hood's work.

Hood wrote a piece for Art Journal in 1980. Titled Sighting the Invisible Frontiers, it focused on the concept of the void. Hood also expressed that she felt that narrative paintings, in their adherence to time frames, miss the essence of the subject. In the same piece, she praised Mark Rothko and Georgia O'Keeffe amongst others as they "bravely crossed invisible frontiers that have seldom been spoken of among formalists." Hood praised O'Keeffe in particular for including the void and nature together in her works. In 1982, she was included in a documentary about women artists called From the Heart. In 1983, Hood's work was exhibited in the Kunstverein in Salzburg. In 1985, an award-winning documentary about her work, The Color of Life, was produced by Carolyn Farb, who was a longtime friend and supporter of Hood. That same year, Hood's work traveled to Kenya where it was shown at the UN Focus International Exhibition. Her work was highlighted at the National Museum of Women in the Arts in Washington, DC, and at the Laguna Gloria Art Museum in Austin in 1989. In 1990, she was awarded an honorary doctorate from the Rhode Island School of Design.

=== Paintings ===
Hood's mature technique consists of poured paint in contrast with sharp, geometric figures. These mature paintings had a mythical aura, and foreshadowed later concerns about abstract art. The combination of automatic painting and pouring lent to Hood's unique aesthetic. Signatures of Hood's work are color, texture, form, line, and scale. Brushstrokes are rarely evident in Hood's paintings, rather, the movement of paint created the images. Her sense of color evolved over time. She started with a limited palette and later began to experiment with vivid juxtapositions of color. Hood was a traveler, both physically and spiritually. As a result, her art included mysterious and sweeping gestures. These reference natural phenomena. Hood was drawn to a sense of place and the people who live in that place which help inform her choice of colors and imagery. She called her work "landscapes of my psyche." It was important to Hood that her art make viewers "feel what she felt." Hood's paintings evoke a "psychic void of space" and her later work, notably after the death of her husband, was focused on the void. In the 1960s Hood's paintings became larger and more vibrant, qualities which were heightened in the 1970s. In Houston, Hood's studio was larger than her studio in Mexico which allowed her to create larger works. In the 1980s, her work was notably inspired by 2001: A Space Odyssey and space travel. The void became increasingly important to Hood, and works such as Centrifugal Orbit included black voids in contrast to white.

=== Drawings ===
Hood was also known for her drawings. Her drawings were thought to "reflect profound intimacy of [Hood's] spiritual and emotional growth over 30 years." Linear elements and organic symbols were employed in Hood's drawings to create multidimensional space. From 1941 to 1948, Hood's drawings mostly featured self portraits with an imaginative element, her family, children, and animals. Some depicted unhappy and impoverished children in Mexico. Hood was empathetic towards lonely youth as she identified with them after her own lonely upbringing. Neither her parents, nor her training at the Rhode Island School of Design had any long-term influence on her drawings. The influence of both José Clemente Orozco and Edvard Munch can be seen in the linear figure groupings of her drawings from this period. Mexico and surrealism were also major influences on Hood's drawings. From 1949 to 1960, Hood's drawings included more nature, depicting plants and animals, and became increasingly abstract with complex spatial arrangements. These drawings were less Western and referenced ancient and spiritual Native American traditions.

=== Collages ===
Hood began collaging in 1983, 40 years into her art career. Much like Hood's drawings featured a multidimensional spatial framework, Her collages employed unique depictions of space and dimensions. Hood's collages focus on the space age and cybernetics, which Hood felt left a vast field of information with no room for humans. Through harmony, and Christianity and Hinduism, Hood sought to remedy humans with cybernetics. Using stationery, book and magazine illustrations, her paintings, maps, wrapping paper, and newspaper, Hood explored the mind and human psyche by delineating reality and illusion in her collages.

=== Legacy ===
In 2015, Texas A&M curated an exhibit intended to be the first in-depth overview of Hood's art and life. The exhibit includes 65 paintings, and 35 drawings and collages. Susie Kalil, an art historian focused on modern Texan art, is writing the first book on Hood. In late 2016, the Art Museum of South Texas turned over the bulk of the museum to an exhibition of her works: Dorothy Hood: The Color of Being/El Color Del Sur.

Hood created a collection of collages, such as those shown at the "Dorothy Hood Collages: Connecting Change" exhibition at the Wallace Wentworth Gallery in 1988. She received a Lifetime Achievement Award from Women's Caucus for Art in 1988.

Hood became one of Texas' most famous artists, notable as Texas had been known prior for paintings depicting prairies and cowboys.

== Later years and death ==
In the late 1990s Hood discovered that she had breast cancer and died in October 2000. Much of her art and ephemera was given to the Art Museum of South Texas in 2000. The Dorothy Hood Papers are held at the University of Houston Libraries Special Collections in Houston, Texas. Many of her papers, including eight scrapbooks and numerous documents of her career, are also on microfilm at the Archives of American Art at the Smithsonian Institution. Many correspondences have been discovered in her belongings, including letters exchanged with Meredith Long who discovered Hood in Mexico, and Clement Greenberg. An artist file documenting her career is held at the Smithsonian American Art Museum / National Portrait Gallery Library of the Smithsonian Libraries.

== Personal life ==
Hood was married to Bolivian composer, José María Velasco Maidana in 1946. They traveled together following Maidana's conducting jobs between Mexico City, New York City and Houston until the early 1960s. Maidana deeply enriched Hood's knowledge of Native and Latin American cultures through travel. Around that time her husband began to show symptoms of Parkinson's disease and could no longer conduct. They chose to move to Houston where they would have access to better medical care. Houston also provided Hood with an art market better suited to earning a living. Hood supported herself and her husband until his death in 1989. After Maidana's death, Hood missed her husband, and took to painting "the void" with fervor.

== Collections ==
Work by the artist is represented in major museum collections, including:

- Addison Gallery of American Art at Philips Academy, Andover, Massachusetts
- Art Museum of South Texas, Corpus Christi, Texas
- Art Museum of Southeast Texas, Beaumont, Texas
- Baylor University, Waco, Texas
- Blanton Museum of Art, University of Texas at Austin, Texas
- Brooklyn Museum, New York, New York
- Dallas Museum of Art, Dallas, Texas
- Everson Museum of Art, Syracuse, New York
- Maier Museum of Art, Randolph College, Lynchburg, Virginia
- McNay Art Museum, San Antonio, Texas
- Modern Art Museum, Fort Worth, Texas
- Museo Moderne Arte, Mexico City, Mexico
- Museum of Fine Arts, Houston, Texas
- Museum of Modern Art, New York, New York
- Neuberger Museum of Art; Purchase College East, Purchase, New York
- Ogden Museum of Southern Art, Louisiana
- Rhode Island School of Design Museum, Providence, Rhode Island
- Philadelphia Museum of Art, Philadelphia, Pennsylvania
- Rice University, Fondren Library, Houston, Texas
- San Antonio Museum of Art, San Antonio, Texas
- San Diego Museum of Contemporary Art, San Diego, California
- San Francisco Museum of Modern Art, San Francisco, California
- Santa Barbara Museum of Art, Santa Barbara, California
- Texas A&M University Art Galleries, College Station, Texas
- University of Houston, Houston, Texas
- University of Mary Washington Galleries, Fredericksburg, Virginia
- Whitney Museum of American Art, New York, New York
- Worcester Art Museum, Worcester, Massachusetts
