= Las Malcogidas =

- Directed by: Denisse Arancibia
- Produced by: Victoria Guerrero
- Starring: Denisse Arancibia; Ariel Vargas; Bernardo Arancibia Flores; Marta Monzón; Rosa Ríos; Fernando Barbosa; Scarlet Bolívar
- Cinematography: Juan Pablo Urioste
- Edited by: Daniel Bargach Mitre
- Production companies: Nairacine Bolivia; Lagartocine Argentina; Programa Ibermedia; Hivos/Conexión; Labo Digital; 4 K Post
- Distributed by: Distri Films (Bolivia)
- Release date: 21 September 2017
- Running time: 94 minutes
- Country: Bolivia
- Language: Spanish
- Budget: $527,000
- Box office: $73,680

Las Malcogidas (Spanish for "Badly-fucked women") is a Bolivian film shot in La Paz and directed by Denisse Arancibia. It premiered in Bolivia on 21 September 2017 and starred Denisse Arancibia Flores and Ariel Vargas.

It was produced by production companies Lagartocine from Argentina and Nairicine from Bolivia, with Bolivian company Cinearte credited as associate producers. Las Malcogidas had a production budget of around $500,000 and was supported by the Iberomedia and Hivos programmes.

During the 5-year development phase, the project participated in the Coproduction Forum of the San Sebastian Film Festival and in the Bolivia Lab, where it received the script evaluation prize from Spanish judge José Ángel Esteban.

== Plot summary ==
Carmen is over 30, weighs more than 100 kilos and has never had an orgasm. She is in love with her neighbour Álvaro, the singer in a mediocre rock group. She lives with her brother Honorio, who was elected "Miss Travesti" on various occasions and calls himself "Karmen with a K". Both live in the house of their narcoleptic grandmother Carmen. The younger Carmen tries to lose weight and struggles to defeat a family curse and thus manage to achieve an orgasm.

== Awards and nominations ==
It was preselected for the Platino Awards. It won Best feature-length film at the Eduardo Avaroa Awards.
