= I Miss You (2019 film) =

2019 film

- Film poster
- Directed by: Rodrigo Bellott
- Starring: Oscar Martínez; Rossy de Palma; Fernando Barbosa
- Release dates: 27 July 2019 (Outfest (US)); 22 August 2019 (Bolivia)
- Running time: 105 minutes
- Country: Bolivia
- Language: Spanish

I Miss You (Spanish: Tu me manques) is a 2019 Bolivian drama film directed by Rodrigo Bellott. It was selected as the Bolivian entry for the Best International Feature Film at the 92nd Academy Awards, but it was not nominated.

== Plot ==
After his son dies by suicide, a father arrives in New York to confront his son's boyfriend.

== Cast ==
- Oscar Martínez as Jorge
- Rossy de Palma as Rosaura
- Fernando Barbosa as Sebastian
- Rick Cosnett as Chase
- Dominic Colón as Alonso
- Ana Asensio as Andrea

== Reception ==
=== Accolades ===
Year	Award	Category	Recipient(s)	Result	Ref.
2019	Outfest	Grand Jury Prize for Best Screenwriting	Rodrigo Bellott	Won	
2020	Guadalajara International Film Festival	Ibero-American Fiction	Tu Me Manques	Nominated	
2020	Guadalajara International Film Festival	Premio Maguey	Tu Me Manques	Nominated	
2020	Palm Springs International Film Festival	Best of the Fest Audience Vote	Tu Me Manques	Won	
2020	Palm Springs International Film Festival	Best Foreign Language Film	Tu Me Manques	Nominated	
2022	GLAAD Media Awards	Outstanding Film – Limited Release	Tu Me Manques	Nominated	

== See also ==
- List of submissions to the 92nd Academy Awards for Best International Feature Film
- List of Bolivian submissions for the Academy Award for Best International Feature Film
