= Claudia Conserva =

Chilean actress, model and presenter

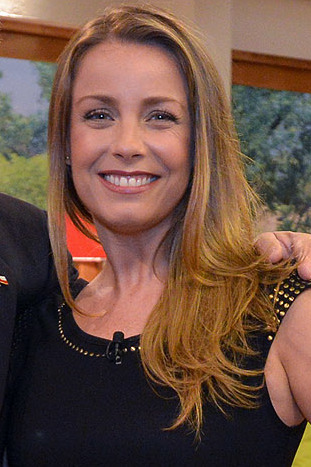
- Claudia Conserva in 2013.
- Born: Claudia Marcela Conserva Pérez; 12 January 1974 (age 51); Santiago de Chile, Chile
- Occupation(s): Actress, Television presenter
- Years active: 1990-present
- Spouse: Juan Carlos Valdivia
- Children: 2

Claudia Marcela Conserva Pérez (born 12 January 1974, Santiago) is a Chilean actress, model and television presenter of Italian-Arbereshe ancestry. She studied ballet and worked in publicity and TV programs when she was a child and in 1990 she won Miss 17. She met her husband Juan Carlos Valdivia in Extra Jóvenes (Chilevisión). They have two children.

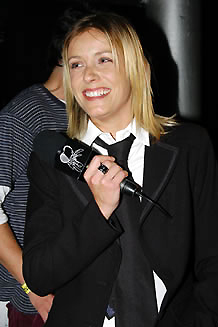
Conserva in 2007 as presenter of CQC Chile

== Teleseries ==
Year	Series	Role	Channel
1995	El amor está de moda		Canal 13
1996	Marron Glacé, el regreso		Canal 13
1997	Eclipse de Luna		Canal 13
1998	Amándote		Canal 13
1999	Fuera de Control	Carrie Castro	Canal 13

== Television programs ==
Program	Channel
Extra-Jóvenes	Chilevisión/Canal 11
La Muela del Juicio	Chilevisión/Canal 11
Maravillozoo	Canal 13
Video Loco	Canal 13
Verte Crecer	Canal 13
Desde la Terraza	Canal 13
Bravo Bravísimo	Canal 13
Pollo en Conserva	RedTV
Buenos días a todos	TVN
Vive Viña en TVN	TVN
