= Art Museum of South Texas =

Museum in Corpus Christi, Texas

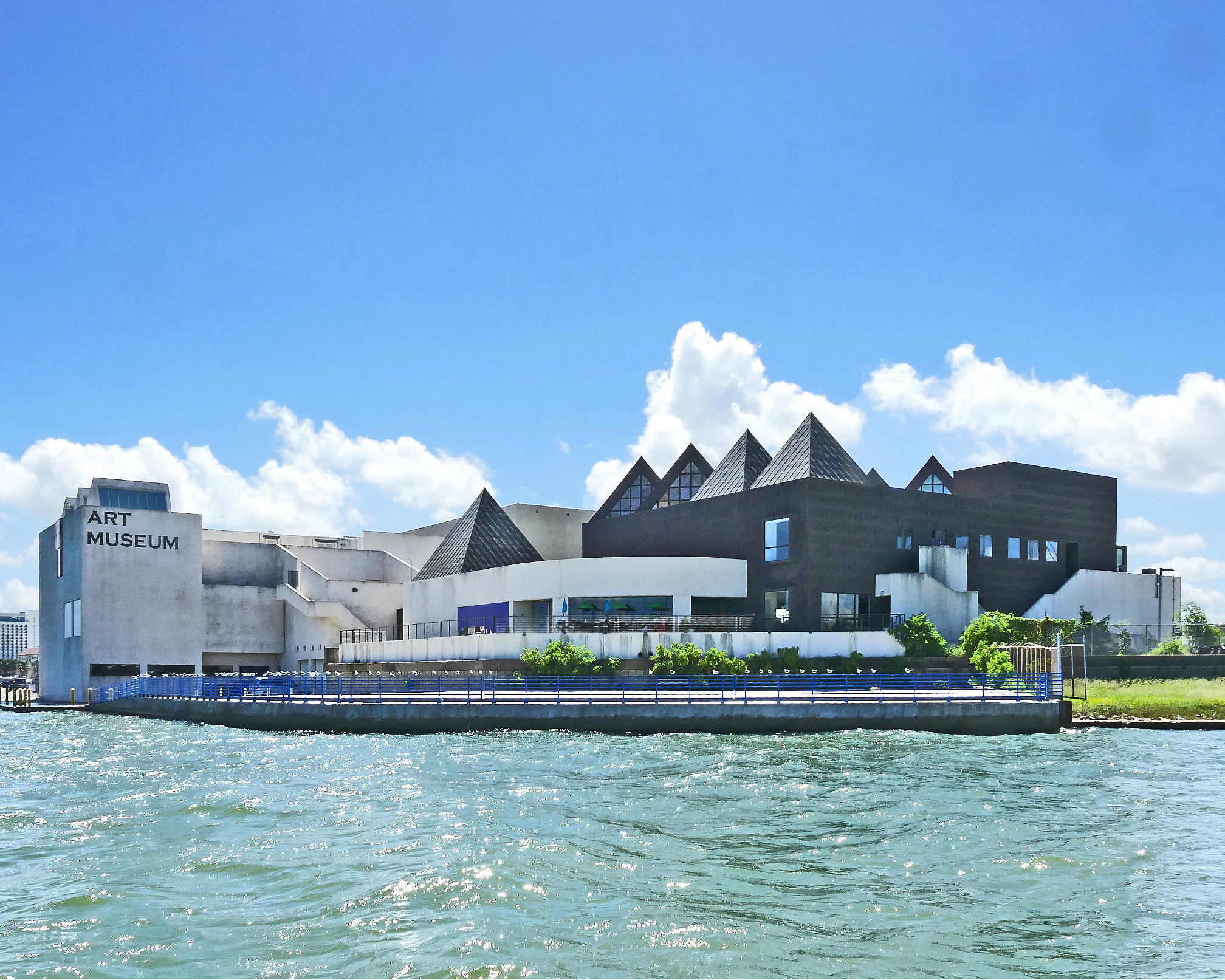
- Art Museum of South Texas as viewed from Corpus Christi Bay in October 2018
- Established: 1936
- Location: 1902 N Shoreline; Corpus Christi, TX 78401 United States
- Coordinates: 27.8104°N 97.3930°W
- Type: Art Museum
- Director: Sara Sells Morgan
- Website: www.artmuseumofsouthtexas.org

The Art Museum of South Texas, located in Corpus Christi, Texas, is an art museum which was established in 1936.

== History ==
In 1936, the Centennial Museum was opened by the city of Corpus Christi. The museum was then given to two art organizations by the city in 1945, who renamed it the Art Museum of South Texas. After the museum ran out of space in the 1960s, a movement began to fund and construct a new building. Designed by American architect Philip Johnson, the new building broke ground in 1970 and opened to the public two years later. In 1995, the state's legislature affiliated the art museum with Texas A&M University Corpus Christi. In October 2006, the museum nearly doubled its space with opening of the William B. and Maureen Miller wing. On July 25, 2020, Hurricane Hanna's storm surge flooded the museum's barge dock, while no artwork sustained any damage during hurricane Hannah, the barge dock classrooms, labs, and the parking lot had sustained mild water damage. The process of protecting art from all hurricane alerts is to move from the storage room to the upper levels, which takes over three hours to complete.

== Collection ==
The Art Museum of South Texas is currently home to more than 2,022 works of art. Most art originates from the Americas, namely Texas. Most of the Museum's collection lie in the areas of paintings, photographs, sculptures, ceramics, glass, crafts, works of art on paper, and large installation pieces.

=== Permanent Collection Pieces ===
- Bernard Buffet, Le Poisson (1962), gifted to the Art Museum of South Texas by Mr. and Mrs. Charles D. Clark
- Jean-Honoré Fragonard, Girl with a Pearl Necklace: Portrait of Rosalie Fragonard (1785-88), gifted to the Art Museum of South Texas by Mrs. John A. King
- Alison McLean Schuchs, Pointy Boots (2025), Gifted to the Art Museum of South Texas by aforementioned artist (Alison McLean Schuchs)
- Leonard Baskin, Standing Birdman (1963), Gifted to the Art Museum of South Texas by Reynold's Metal co.
- Chapman Kelley, Nude (1967), gifted to the Art Museum of South Texas by Mr. and Mrs. Edwin Singer
- Anne Healy, Cathedral (1974), gifted to the Art Museum of South Texas by the Florence Louchhiem stol Foundation

== Architecture ==
The main building, which opened in 1972, was designed by renowned architect Philip Johnson, who is regarded as one of the founders of postmodern architecture. In the 1960s, two patrons of the museum, Patsy and Edwin Singer traveled to New York City to meet with Johnson and ask him to design a building for the new museum. After procuring the $1 million that Johnson requested, he agreed to their request. The Art Museum of South Texas is often identified as one of Johnson's finest small public buildings and is an early example of postmodern architecture in the United States.

In 1997, the museum board contacted the famed Mexican architect Ricardo Legorreta, who had recently designed the new building for the main branch of the San Antonio Public Library. Legorreta was hired in 1998 to design a building that would complement the original Philip Johnson-designed building. When the museum was remodeled, there was a lack of storage space created for the growing art. In 2004, Ricardo Legoretta added 4,500 square feet to the museum that was under sea level. In 2006, the new expansion opened, which doubled the size of the museum.

== Community events ==
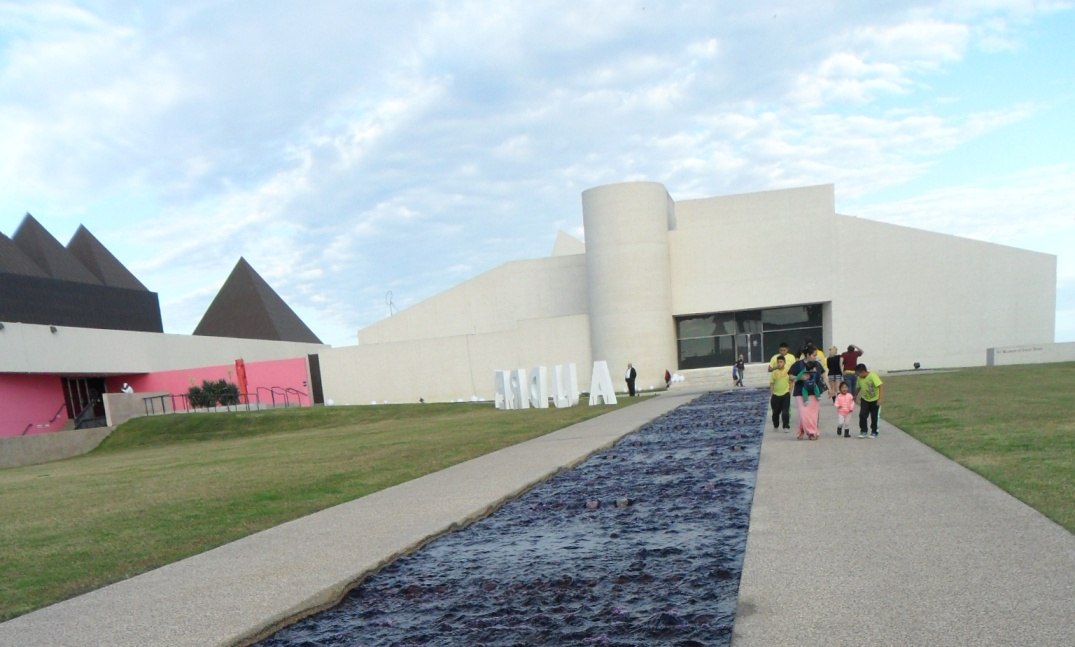
The front entrance to the museum in January 2010

At the end of 2025, the director of the museum noted people from all 50 states plus from 28 additional countries visited the art museum. However, much of the community has never visited or seen the museum in a while. Community events allow more outreach to the community to experience the art museum.

The museum hosts numerous community outreach programs throughout the year, including:

- Visionarios Youth Art Contest: Students in grades 1–12 in the region can submit wet media, dry media, digital and photographic media to be placed in galleries at the museum.
- Christmas Tree Forest Contest: Around Christmas, schools in the area are allowed to create trees based on award-winning books and create ornaments and decor reflecting the story. After being displayed at the museum, the trees are donated to families in need on Christmas Eve.
- Super Saturday: Children (ages 5–12) get to create visual and performing art, being visited by guest artists, and constructing special projects from 1–3 pm on the first Saturday of each month.
- Mom and Tots (and Sometimes Pops!): On the morning of the 2nd and 4th Friday over each month (excluding holidays), preschoolers (ages 2–5) enjoy actives based on a current museum exhibition and a story time.
- Young Artist Workshop: Usually held on the 2nd Saturday of every month, kids experience an hour and a half studio art class.
- Arts After School: Held during the school year at the Antonio E. Garcia Arts & Education Center, this program gives ages 5–12 an encounter with visual and performing arts, health nutrition, and exercise classes.
- Free Family Days: On selected Sundays, children get to enjoy a free afternoon of art activities, music, live performances and a view of the exhibitions.
- Third Thursday: Every Third Thursday of each month, enjoy free admission beginning at 5:30pm until 9pm, live music, local vendors, poetry readings, yoga in the galleries, organization spotlights and more.
- First Friday: Every First Friday of each month, enjoy free admission all day with extended hours, 10am-9pm
- Second Saturday: Every Second Saturday of each month, enjoy free admission, docent tours, art activities, and special guests
- Fourth Sunday: New as of May 2024, every Fourth Sunday of each month, enjoy free admission 1-5PM

=== Camps ===
- Spring Break Camp
- The Fine Art of Summer Camp
- Winter Holiday Camp
- "Very Important Kid" Camp

== Management ==
The Centennial Museum was operated by the city of Corpus Christi until 1945 when its ownership was given to the South Texas Art League and the Corpus Christi Guild. At an unknown time, William G. Otto became the director of the art museum until he retired in 2006. In October 2007, Joe Schenk took his position. In June 2019, Schenk then retired with Sara Sells Morgan becoming the director in December of that same year.

== See also ==
- List of museums in South Texas
- Dorothy Hood
