= Anne Healy =

American artist (born 1939)

Anne Laura Healy (born 1939) is an American artist who was a founding member of AIR Gallery. She worked as a professor at the University of California Berkeley and has work in the permanent collection of several museums, including the Smithsonian American Art Museum.

== Biography ==
Healy was born in New York, New York in 1939. She earned her BA from Queens College, City University, NYC, in 1962. In addition to being a founder member of AIR Gallery, she was a panel moderator and curator of several exhibits. She was editor of the Heresies #5: The Great Goddess. From 1981- 2003, she was professor at the University of California Berkeley, 1989-1996 president and member of the San Francisco Arts Commission. In 1995, she served as a delegate to the United Nations 4th World Conference on Women in Beijing. In 1997, she curated an exhibition of 5 Chinese women artists at UC Berkeley, Worth Ryder art gallery. Some of her works are in the permanent collections of Museum of Contemporary Crafts in NYC, Allen Art Museum in Oberlin, Ohio and the Art Museum of South Texas, Corpus Christi, and the Smithsonian American Art Museum.
