= The Courage of the People =

- El coraje del pueblo
- Directed by: Jorge Sanjinés
- Written by: Óscar Soria
- Starring: Domitila Barrios de Chungara; Eusebio Gironda; Federico Vallejo; Felicidad Coca García
- Production company: Grupo Ukamau
- Release date: 1971
- Country: Bolivia
- Language: Spanish

The Courage of the People (Spanish: El coraje del pueblo) is a 1971 Bolivian docudrama film directed by Jorge Sanjinés and starring Domitila Barrios de Chungara, Eusebio Gironda, Federico Vallejo and Felicidad Coca García. Made with the Grupo Ukamau collective, it reconstructs the massacres of Bolivian mineworkers, centering on the Night of San Juan massacre of 1967 at the Siglo XX mine under the government of René Barrientos. Several of the participants had lived through the events and reenact them on screen, a hallmark of Sanjinés's participatory cinema. It is regarded as a landmark of Bolivian and New Latin American Cinema.

== Synopsis ==
The film recounts the massacres that took place before and after the 1952 Bolivian Revolution, focusing on the Night of San Juan during the dictatorship of René Barrientos. The protagonists—some of whom experienced the events firsthand—recount their experiences during this turbulent period, in which Barrientos's repressive forces committed atrocities under the pretext of suppressing the subversive movement inspired by Che Guevara.

== Cast ==
- Domitila Barrios de Chungara
- Eusebio Gironda
- Federico Vallejo
- Felicidad Coca García

== Production and style ==
The film was made by Sanjinés and the Grupo Ukamau collective using non-professional performers—many of them actual survivors of the events depicted—reenacting the repression they had endured. This blending of documentary testimony and dramatic reconstruction is characteristic of Sanjinés's work and of the militant Third Cinema movement.
