= Pseudo (film) =

2020 Bolivian political suspense thriller film

Pseudo is a 2020 Bolivian film. A political suspense-thriller, the film, directed by Luis Reneo and Gory Patiño, was released to critical and public acclaim.

== Plot ==
A Bolivian taxi driver steals a passenger's identity, as the passenger appeared to be a well-off photographer and the driver wanted to live a better life. But as it turned out, the passenger was a hit-man who was on a mission to commit a political assassination and the taxi driver thus unwittingly gets involved in a terrorist plot to overtake Bolivia.

== Cast ==
- Cristian Mercado
- Milton Cortez
- Luigi Antezana
- Carla Arana

== Availability ==
Since 2022 the movie has been shown on some premium cable television networks in the United States.
