= Chaco (film) =

2020 film

- Theatrical release poster
- Directed by: Diego Mondaca
- Starring: Fabián Arenillas
- Release date: 28 January 2020 (Rotterdam)
- Running time: 80 minutes
- Countries: Bolivia; Argentina
- Languages: Aymara; Quechua; Spanish

Chaco is a 2020 Bolivian-Argentine war drama film directed by Diego Mondaca and set in 1934 during the Chaco War. It was selected as the Bolivian entry for the Best International Feature Film at the 93rd Academy Awards, but it was not nominated.

== Plot ==
A company of Bolivian soldiers of Quechua and Aymará extraction, led by a German captain, wanders through the dry woods and plains of the Chaco in search of their Paraguayan enemy.

== Cast ==
- Fabián Arenillas as Capitán alemán
- Mauricio Toledo as Lieutenant Rogelio
- Jorge Arias as NCO Caballo
- Omar Calisaya as soldado Ticona
- Fausto Castellón as soldado Jacinto
- Raimundo Ramos as cabo Liboro

== See also ==
- List of submissions to the 93rd Academy Awards for Best International Feature Film
- List of Bolivian submissions for the Academy Award for Best International Feature Film
