= The Ones from Below =

- Theatrical release poster
- Directed by: Alejandro Quiroga
- Written by: Alejandro Quiroga
- Produced by: Álvar Olmos Torrico; Francisco J. Paparella; Mayra Auad; Alexandra Yepes; Alejandro Quiroga
- Starring: Fernando Arze Echalar
- Cinematography: Diego Robaldo
- Edited by: Juan Pablo DiBitonto
- Music by: Yonny Roldán
- Production companies: Chirimoya Films; Empatía Cinema; MyMama Entertainment; Río Azul Films
- Release dates: November 7, 2022 (Mar del Plata); June 1, 2023 (Bolivia)
- Running time: 83 minutes
- Countries: Bolivia; Colombia; Brazil; Argentina
- Language: Spanish
- Budget: €330,000

The Ones from Below (Spanish: Los de abajo) is a 2022 Western drama film written, directed and co-produced by Alejandro Quiroga in his directorial debut. It is about a man's journey to recover his town's water that is being diverted by the authorities as part of a plot. Starring Fernando Arze Echalar. It is a co-production between Bolivia, Colombia, Brazil and Argentina.

The Ones from Below had its world premiere at the 37th Mar del Plata International Film Festival on November 7, 2022, where it competed for the Astor Piazzolla Award for Best Feature Film and won Best Performance for Sonia Parada.

== Synopsis ==
Gregorio is a peasant who lives frustrated in his town Rosillas, because the waters of the old ditch were diverted by Colonel Iglesias, a neighboring Argentine landowner, allied in a plot with the mayor of the town for his vine crops. This man will have to overcome neglect, corruption and the power of the elite to bring back the water.

== Cast ==
The actors participating in this film are:

- Fernando Arze Echalar as Gregorio
- César Bordón as Colonel Iglesias
- Luis Bredow as Arnildo
- Sonia Parada as Paula

== Production ==
Principal photography lasted for 5 weeks starting in early August and ending on September 9, 2019. It was filmed on location in Rosillas, the Concepción Valley, Santa Ana, Padcaya and the urban area of Tarija.

== Release ==
The Ones from Below had its world premiere on November 7, 2022, at the 37th Mar del Plata International Film Festival. It was commercially released on June 1, 2023, in Bolivian theaters.

== Accolades ==
Year	Award / Festival	Category	Recipient	Result	Ref.
2022	Mar del Plata International Film Festival	Best Feature Film	The Ones from Below	Nominated	
2022	Mar del Plata International Film Festival	Best Performance	Sonia Parada	Won	
2023	Moscow International Film Festival	Best Actor	Fernando Arze Echalar	Won	
