= Denisse Arancibia =

Bolivian director, screenwriter, and actress

Denisse Arancibia Flores
- Born: January 9, 1982 (age 44); La Paz, Bolivia
- Occupations: Film director; screenwriter; actress

Denisse Arancibia Flores (born January 9, 1982, in La Paz, Bolivia) is a Bolivian film director. She is known for her film Las Malcogidas (2017), which won the Eduardo Abaroa National Award for best feature length fiction film.

== Biography ==
Denisse Arancibia Flores was born in La Paz on January 9, 1982. She has two bachelor's degrees: one in film direction from the Bolivian Catholic University San Pablo and the other in communication from the Universidad San Francisco de Asís.

Arancibia started her career directing plays, including an adaptation of Usted me obligó a hacerlo, by Javier Soria, and editing films. She won awards for her editing, including for the FENAVID Internacional Award for best editing in 2007.

In 2010, she co-directed Casting, the first Bolivian feature length horror film, alongside Juan Pablo Ritcher.

She later wrote, directed, and acted in the comedy Las Malcogidas (2017). About an overweight woman with a skinny, cross-dressing, and beauty pagent-winning sibling, Arancibia has said she made the film to challenge the stereotypes LGBTQ+ people face in comedy films.

== Filmography ==
=== As director ===
- (2010) Casting
- (2017) Las Malcogidas

=== As editor ===
- (2010) ¿De qué color es el cielo?
- (2012) El último paso
- (2018) Polvo
