= Beatriz Azurduy Palacios =

Beatriz Azurduy Palacios Mesa
- Born: July 31, 1952; Oruro, Bolivia
- Died: July 19, 2003 (aged 50); Havana, Cuba

Beatriz Azurduy Palacios Mesa (July 31, 1952, Oruro, Bolivia – July 19, 2003, Havana, Cuba) was a Bolivian motion picture director, screenwriter and activist who advocated for the rights of the indigenous, rural women, and mine workers. She was married and worked with Jorge Sanjinés for over 28 years.

== Biography ==
Among the works she contributed to, either as producer, editor or screenwriter, were ¡Fuera de aquí!, Banderas del amanecer, La nación clandestina y Para recibir el canto de los pájaros. She was a member of the board of directors of the Fundación del Nuevo Cine Latinoamericano. She represented Bolivia at the International School of Cinema and Television of San Antonio de los Baños and was also a member of the Film Directors of Latin America Committee. In 1999, during the XXIst International Festival of the New Latin American Cinema, held in Havana, she received the recognition of the Union of Writers and Artists of Cuba for her significant contribution.

She maintained, to the margin of her cinematographic activities, a constant "shared in common" attitude with the Cuban Revolution and died in that country, where she had traveled to receive medical attention. She is buried in Colon Cemetery, Havana, Cuba.

== Selected articles ==
- “La película no termina con la palabra ‘FIN’” (The Film Does Not End with the Word “END”), Aquí, February 6, 1988
