= Rodrigo Bellott =

Bolivian filmmaker

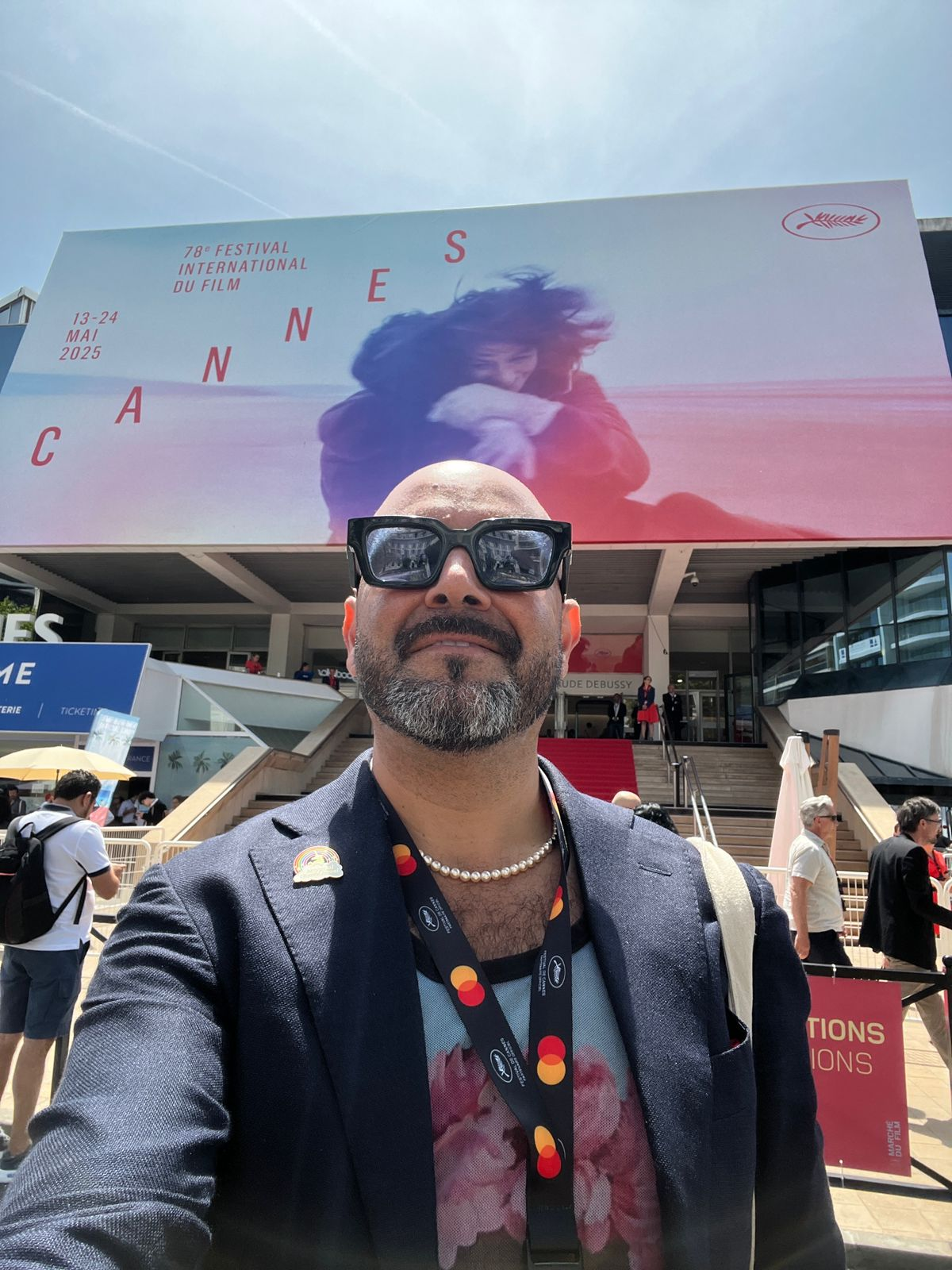
- Rodrigo Bellott at the 2025 Cannes Film Festival
- Born: October 4, 1981 (age 45); Santa Cruz de la Sierra,Bolivia
- Occupations: Film director; screenwriter

Rodrigo Bellott (born October 4, 1981, in Santa Cruz de la Sierra, Bolivia) is a Bolivian film and theater director, screenwriter, and producer. Bellott is gay and much of his work focuses on LGBT+ themes. He was also the first Bolivian director nominated for an Oscar.

== Biography ==
Rodrigo Bellott was born in 1978 in Santa Cruz de la Sierra, Bolivia. When he was growing up in Bolivia, his closeted boyfriend committed suicide, an event that deeply impacted him. In 1997, he moved to the United States to study Cinema and Photography at Ithaca College, in New York. There he made his first short film, Forlorn (Solo) (1999), which won three student film festivals.

His first feature length film, Sexual Dependency (2003), is a drama that focuses on five young people's explorations of their sexualities. It is notable for its experimental visuals and largely nonprofessional cast. Sexual Dependency won 17 different awards and was shown at film festivals in It was also Bolivia's entry for Best Foreign Film at the 76th Academy Awards.

A few years later, Bellott produced his second feature length film, ¿Quién mató a la llamita blanca? (2006) which was widely acclaimed. In an interview with Sandra Parada from February 2025, Bellott said that he has experienced violent attacks in retaliation to this film.

Bellott's fourth feature length film, Tu me manques (2019), is about a man going to the United States from Bolivia to confront his son's boyfriend after his son commits suicide. This film received critical acclaim and inspired hundreds of young Bolivians to come out in a phenomenon colloquially known as the "Tu Me Manques effect." Bellott has said that it started as a "hate letter" he wrote to his own former boyfriend's father after his boyfriend's suicide. The title has been used by Bellott for a play and a book addressing a similar story as well.

Bellott is openly homosexual and a variety of his movies explore LGBT topics, specifically Perfidia (2009), Tu me manques (2019), and Buey rojo sangre (2022).

== Filmography ==
- Forlorn (1998) short film
- Dysfunctional (1999) short film
- Destierro (2000) short film
- Sexo (2000) short film
- Sexual Dependency (2003)
- ¿Quién mató a la llamita blanca? (2007)
- Perfidia (2009)
- Refugiados (2013) short film
- Unicornio (2014) short film
- Tu me manques (2019)
- Buey rojo sangre (2022)
