= Blood of the Condor =

Blood of the Condor Yawar Mallku
- Theatrical release poster
- Directed by: Jorge Sanjinés
- Written by: Jorge Sanjinés
- Produced by: Ricardo Rada
- Starring: Marcelino Yanahuaya
- Cinematography: Antonio Eguino
- Edited by: Jorge Sanjinés
- Music by: Alfredo Domínguez; Ignacio Quispe; Alberto Villalpando
- Production company: Ukamau Group
- Distributed by: Tricontinental Film Center (1973, US)
- Release date: 1969
- Running time: 70 minutes
- Country: Bolivia
- Languages: Quechua; Spanish; English

Blood of the Condor (Quechua: Yawar Mallku, Spanish: Sangre de cóndor) is a 1969 Bolivian third cinema film co-written and directed by Jorge Sanjinés and starring Marcelino Yanahuaya. The film tells the story of an indigenous Bolivian community receiving medical care from the Peace Corps-like United States-backed agency Cuerpo del Progreso ("Progress Corps") which is secretly sterilising local women.

The story, which was based on accounts by the indigenous people to the filmmaker, provoked an outrage in the public which led to a government investigation about the Peace Corps' actions in Bolivia, which ended in the expulsion of the agency from the country in 1971, although there is no documentary evidence that the Peace Corps carried out any sterilizations in Bolivia.

== Plot ==
An indigenous Bolivian community receiving medical care from the Peace Corps-like American agency Cuerpo del Progreso ("Progress Corps") which is secretly sterilising local women. The Bolivians attack the foreigners, and the attackers are rounded up and shot by the authorities. The brother of the shot protagonist desperately seeks medical care for his brother, but due to lack of money for proper care his brother dies.

== Impact ==
Sanjinés' Yawar Mallku is thought to have led to the expulsion of the Peace Corps from Bolivia in an act of anti-imperialist cultural nationalism by the indigenous people.

While considerable outrage against the Peace Corps came from the accusation that they were involuntarily sterilizing women, no documentary evidence has emerged corroborating what is depicted in the film. Bolivian president Juan José Torres, a previous supporter of the Peace Corps, used the outrage generated to bolster his support among left-wing factions by expulsing the organization. Historian James F. Siekmeier argues that prior to and after the film's release the Peace Corps were popular among rural indigenous communities and that sentiment against them was most common among Urban Marxists who feared Peace Corp developments would create a petite bourgeoisie among peasants.

After showings of Yawar Mallku, Sanjinés learned that many peasants had criticism about the difficulty of his films due to the use of flashback for narration, as his film-making was greatly influenced by European art cinema, and about the lack of attention to denouncing the causes of the indigenous peoples' issues. He took this into account when making his next film, called es:El coraje del pueblo ("The Courage of the People"), in 1971.

== See also ==
- Forced sterilization in Peru
