= The Prophecy of the Lake =

La profecía del lago
- Directed by: José María Velasco Maidana
- Country: Bolivia
- Language: silent

The Prophecy of the Lake (La profecía del lago) is an unreleased and lost Bolivian silent feature film, directed by José María Velasco Maidana and completed in 1925.

It was Velasco Maidana's first film, and would have been the second ever Bolivian-made fiction feature released, just after Pedro Sambarino's Corazón Aymara (1925). Set in contemporary Bolivia, it was a love story between an Aymara man and the daughter of a white landowner. Scheduled for release on July 28, it was censored and cancelled by the authorities, due to its "social critique" (highlighting the condition of indigenous Bolivians) and the controversial idea of a white woman falling in love with an indigenous man. The government ordered Velasco Maidana to surrender the film to be burned; in a 1979 interview, the director and his wife recalled that he threatened to burn himself along with his work. He managed to hide it in the walls of his house.

Velasco Maidana subsequently directed Wara Wara (1930), which was accepted by censors as it reversed the gender roles and moved the setting to the sixteenth century, portraying the love of a conquistador for an Inca princess. The Prophecy of the Lake is a lost film, as there are no known copies of it in existence; Wara Wara is the only known surviving work from Bolivia's silent-film era.

== See also ==
- List of lost films
