= Verse (film) =

- Verse
- Directed by: Alejandro Pereyra
- Starring: Mirtha Elena Pardo
- Release date: September 2009
- Running time: 77 minutes
- Language: Spanish

Verse is a 2009 Bolivian film, starring Mirtha Elena Pardo and directed by Alejandro Pereyra.

== See also ==
- Cinema of Bolivia
