= Alejandro Pereyra =

Bolivian poet and filmmaker (born 1981)

Alejandro Pereyra Doria Medina (born 24 February 1981) is a Bolivian poet and filmmaker. He was born in Sucre, Bolivia, lived in Mexico, Brazil and Germany for many years, and now lives in Bolivia. His 2009 feature film Verse was selected for the 2010 Zero Latitude Film Festival Ecuador and the 2011 Festival Del Cinema Latino Americano Trieste.

== Filmography ==
- 2009 Verse
- 2011 Mirar

== See also ==
- Cinema of Bolivia
