= ¿Quién mató a la llamita blanca? =

2007 film

- Directed by: Rodrigo Bellott
- Written by: Alvaro Ruiz; Juan Cristobal Rios Violand
- Produced by: Alex Moreno; Donald Ranvaud
- Starring: Vico Paredes; Daniel Bargach-Mitre
- Cinematography: Roberto Lanza Lobo
- Edited by: Daniel Bargach-Mitre; Vico Paredes
- Music by: Daniel Bargach-Mitre
- Release date: 2006
- Country: Bolivia
- Language: Spanish
- Budget: $500,000

¿Quién mató a la llamita blanca? (English: Who killed the little white llama?) is a 2006 Bolivian movie that was written by Juan Cristobal Rios Violand and directed by Rodrigo Bellott. The film is both a celebration and a parody of Bolivian customs, countryside and culture, with a serious message about the endemic poverty in Bolivia.

== Plot ==
Jacinto and Domitila are two indigenous Bolivians who are both happily married and the most notorious criminals in the country. They accept a job to transport 50 kg of cocaine to the Brazilian border. They disguise themselves as a farming couple expecting a baby, with the cocaine hidden in Domitilas false pregnant belly. The two begin their journey in El Alto along Bolivia’s central corridor.

The man behind the smuggling operation is El Negro, an American who has secrets of his own. The couple gains notoriety due to media interest, which dubs them "Los Tortolitos" (The Lovebirds)—a sort of national anti-hero duo. On the trail of Jacinto and Domitilia are two anti-narcotics officers, who turn out to have immoral and illegal sides of their own.

The film follows the two protagonists through jungles, cities and rural landscapes as they outwit their pursuers. The journey reveals cultural elements of Bolivian society, shaped by the distinct characteristics of each region. The story’s omniscient narrator is Guery Sandoval, who states in the film that everything takes place in a country "where everything happens, yet nothing happens."

== Cast ==
- Erika Andia - Domitila Condori Pérez
- Miguel Valverde - Jacinto Choquetijlla
- Guery Sandoval - Narrador
- Pablo Fernández - Ruber "Chicho" Von-Bergen
- Agustín "Cacho" Mendieta - Urbano "Perucho" Pérez
- John Byres - Daniel "Negro" White
- Hugo Pozo - Alberto "Tocayo" Solís Jiménez
- Luigi Antezana - Edgar, Daniel's translator
- José Saavedra - Jorge "Coco" Suárez, the Minister of Government
- Duston Larsen - Él mismo, Mr. Bolivia
- Rodrigo Bellot - Hare Krishna
- Atajo - Themselves (cameo)

== Release ==
The film premiered on March 15 2007 in Argentina.

== Reception ==
When released in Bolivia, the film broke all box office records and became the most infringed DVD in the country, playing frequently in the restaurants and buses that once showcased standard Hollywood fare.

== Soundtrack ==
No.	Title	Performer(s)	Length
1.	"Celia"	Alcohólika L.C
2.	"Que la DEA no me vea"	Atajo
3.	"Raza de Bronce"	Alcohólika L.C
