= Once Upon a Time in Bolivia =

- Theatrical release poster
- Spanish: Erase una Vez en Bolivia
- Directed by: Patrick L. Cordova
- Written by: Patrick L. Cordova
- Produced by: Patrick L. Corova; Paola Gosalvez; Nahuel Attar
- Starring: Luis Caballero; Miguel Angel Mamani; Ivan Nogales; Raul Beltran; Miguel Estellano; Reynaldo Yuhra
- Cinematography: Daniel Landau
- Edited by: Nahuel Attar
- Music by: Huellas; Gabriel Williams; Aqualactica
- Production companies: Project 13 Films; Pucara Films; Cine Artesanal
- Release date: 2012
- Running time: 80 minutes
- Countries: Bolivia; United Kingdom
- Languages: Spanish; English

Once Upon a Time in Bolivia (Spanish: Erase Una Vez en Bolivia) is a 2012 independent Bolivian road movie that was written, produced and directed by Patrick L Cordova. The film stars Luis Caballero and Miguel Angel Mamani as two half-brothers of mixed race who find themselves in a sprint to the Bolivia-Chile border.

It is set against a backdrop of the 2003 Bolivian gas conflict and was shot during 2010 in the slums of El Alto and on El Altiplano in La Paz, Bolivia on a micro budget, using primarily non-professional actors.

== Plot ==
Rocky (Luis Caballero), the older, illegitimate white son of a Bolivian mother and absent American father, returns home from prison to El Alto and the house he shares with his girlfriend and his also illegitimate indigenous half-brother, Nene (Miguel Angel Mamani). Rocky and Nene's relationship is strained and distant. Rocky pays little attention to his girlfriend and goads his half-brother. Nene reveals that his estranged father has left him a small plot of land as inheritance. Rocky takes an interest in visiting the land with his brother.

They visit the land and discover that it is a tiny and worthless sliver of land in the middle of nowhere. While Nene laments his inheritance, Rocky mocks him for his naiveté. The brothers are ideologically opposed when it comes to notions of national identity, their values, ideas about their native Bolivia and relationships. Rocky sees something during his visit to the land that intrigues him. Rocky returns to the land the next day and discovers something buried there that leads him to flee for the Chilean border which is rumored to be closing due to the political turmoil around the gas conflict. Rocky encounters difficulties and is forced to call on his brother to help him to the border. Unbeknownst to Nene, in doing this, Nene is helping Rocky deceive him.

The brothers encounter numerous difficulties on their journey that strain their relationship even further, but the difficulties they encounter force them to find common ground in the interests of getting themselves to the border on time. The obstacles they encounter are a microcosm of some of the contemporaneous social and economic problems that face Bolivians.

== Cast ==
- Luis Caballero as Rocky
- Miguel Angel Mamani as Nene
- Iván Nogales as The Hitcher
- Raúl Beltrán as Red Hat
- Miguel Estellano as Cop
- Reynaldo Yuhra as Miner
- Patrick L. Cordova (cameo)

== Awards ==
- 2013, won 'Best International Feature' at the London Independent Film Festival
- 2013, won 'Best Andean Feature' at the Festival International de Cine En Pasto
- 2014, won 'Best Feature Film' at Golden Egg Film Festival
- 2014, won 'Best Director of a Feature' at Golden Egg Film Festival
