= Wara Wara =

1930 film

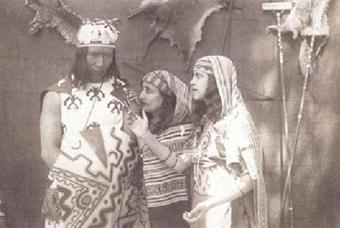
- Directed by: José María Velasco Maidana
- Starring: Juanita Taillansier; Martha de Velasco; Arturo Borda; Guillermo Viscarra Fabre; Emmo Reyes
- Distributed by: Urania Film
- Release date: 1930
- Running time: 69 minutes (restored version, 24 fps)
- Country: Bolivia
- Language: silent

Wara Wara is a 1930 Bolivian feature film, directed by José María Velasco Maidana, combining historical drama and romance. The film was described as a "superproduction" by the press at the time.

Long thought to be a lost film, it was rediscovered in 1989, restored, and screened for a new "premiere" in September 2010. It is "the only known surviving work from Bolivia's silent-film era".

== Plot ==
Wara Wara (reconstructed version of the film)

The film is named for the eponymous main character, Inca princess Wara Wara (played by Juanita Taillansier). Set in the 16th century, it is a "historical narrative of the Spanish conquest of Qullasuyu", the Aymara territories of the Inca Empire. "A peaceful Inca community is massacred by a group of conquistadores", and survivors -among whom Wara Wara- flee into the mountains. Later, Wara Wara is assaulted by two Spanish soldiers, and rescued by "a conquistador with a noble heart", Tristan de la Vega. The two fall in love, but are confronted with the mutual hatred between their peoples. Sentenced to death, they escape, and "live happily ever after". The film's closing scene show "a final prude kiss against the backdrop of a sunset on the edge of the Incas' sacred lake", Lake Titicaca.

== Production background ==
Velasco Maidana had previously directed The Prophecy of the Lake (La profecía del lago), a 1925 film and love story between an Aymara man and the daughter of a white landowner. The film was censored for its "social critique", and never shown. For Wara Wara, he inverted the gender roles (an indigenous woman falling in love with a white man), and changed the setting. The Prophecy of the Lake had been set in his own time, while Wara Wara was set four centuries earlier, so as to appear less shocking and avoid censorship. Wara Wara was inspired by Antonio Diaz Villamil's novel La voz de la quena.

The first version of the film, featured Ana Rosa Tornero and Luis Pizarroso Cuenca. After filming the kiss scene, Tornero, who was also a teacher and a journalist, feared that the film would cause irreparable harm to her reputation. She quit the picture and denounced it forcing Velasco Maidana to find a new cast.

The film was shot in Bolivia, between La Paz and Lake Titicaca. It premiered at the Teatro Princesa in La Paz on 9 January 1930, and was shown thirty-two times. No copies were subsequently thought to have been kept, and Wara Wara became a lost film.

== Rediscovery ==
In 1989, the director's grandson inherited some of his belongings, and discovered film reels among them, mostly in very good condition. They did not contain the film in its final form, but a jumble of shots, leaving little indication as to their proper order, save for references to the plot in press coverage at the time. The film thus had to be not just restored, but reconstructed. In addition, the precise original musical accompaniment was unknown. During the film's original release, music had been played live. Cinemateca Boliviana, in charge of restoring the film, decided to add a soundtrack - taken partly from Velsaco Maidana's 1940 ballet Amerindia. Certain reels were quite badly damaged, and thus took a long time to restore. This was the case, in particular, of the film's ending, which only became viewable in 2009.

The restored film's premiere was on 23 September 2010 at the Cinemateca Boliviana's centre in La Paz.

The restoration was the topic of a book, Wara Wara. La reconstrucción de una película perdida, by filmmaker Fernando Vargas Villazon.

== Context and significance ==
Jeff Himpele, in Circuits of Culture: Media, Politics, and Indigenous Identity in the Andes, places Wara Wara in the context of the Bolivian state's "indigenist project" of the 1920s and 1930s. Wara Wara, like Pedro Sambarino's Corazón Aymara (1925), served as a "visual register of the modernization of the nation state" - thus, according to José Antonio Lucero of the University of Washington, "narrating a future of synthetic mestizo nation building". Lucero also notes that indigenous characters in the cinema of the time were orientalised and played by non-indigenous actors and actresses.

Le Courrier described it as a "universal fairy tale, reminiscent of Romeo and Juliet's balcony, but which remains closer to Pocahontas"; it depicts the triumph of love over inter-ethnic hatred. It also "depicts a homogenous society, which has succeeded in assimilating its indigenous people". Yet, the Courrier argues, Velasco Maidana was progressive for his era. Even though the film is "imbued with the colonial ethnic blending which was popular at the time, Velasco Maidana denounces, in his film, the condition of Indians in Bolivia and is concerned with the suffering of indigenous peoples. He raises the question of their place in society, and defies his society's racist prejudice".

Historian Carlos Mesa, who founded Cinemateca Boliviana in 1976 and was its director until 1985, then served as President of Bolivia from 2003 to 2005, inscribes Wara Wara and Corazón Aymara within an "avant-garde intellectual and artistic movement" which promoted the role of indigenous Bolivians in the 1920s and 1930s. He describes the film as an "idealisation of ethnic blending", and suggests that it promotes a more unifying model of Bolivia than President Evo Morales' model of a plurinational state.

== See also ==
- List of rediscovered films
