= Own Hand =

- Theatrical release poster
- Directed by: Rodrigo Patino
- Screenplay by: Rodrigo Patino
- Based on: Tribus de la inquisición by Roberto Navia
- Produced by: Claudia Gaensel
- Starring: Alejandro Marañón; Freddy Chipana
- Cinematography: Pablo Paniagua
- Music by: Cergio Prudencio
- Production company: Macondo Art
- Release date: September 19, 2024
- Running time: 99 minutes
- Country: Bolivia
- Language: Spanish

Own Hand (Spanish: Mano propia) is a 2024 Bolivian thriller film written and directed by Rodrigo Patino. It is based on the 2013 journalistic chronicle Tribus de la inquisición by Roberto Navia. Starring Alejandro Marañón and Freddy Chipana. It premiered on September 19, 2024, in Bolivian theaters.

It was selected as the Bolivian entry for the Best International Feature Film at the 97th Academy Awards, but was not nominated.

== Synopsis ==
Mario Vega is a prosecutor committed to respecting judicial processes, who fights to avoid the execution of five young people from Villa Nogales, accused of stealing a truck. On their journey they are joined by Miguel, the father of one of the accused, and Adrián, one of the young people.

== Cast ==
- Alejandro Marañon as Mario Vega
- Freddy Chipana as Miguel
- Gonzalo Callejas as Montes
- Christian Castillo as Waldo
- Raimundo Ramos as Rolando
- Victoria Suaznabar as Gabriela
- Mauricio Toledo as Pollo
- Bernardo Rosado
- Carlos Ureña

== Production ==
Principal photography took place in 2023, lasting 5 weeks in Palos Blancos and Sapecho, Bolivia.

== See also ==
- List of submissions to the 97th Academy Awards for Best International Feature Film
- List of Bolivian submissions for the Academy Award for Best International Feature Film
