= Domitila Chúngara =

Domitila Barrios de Chungara
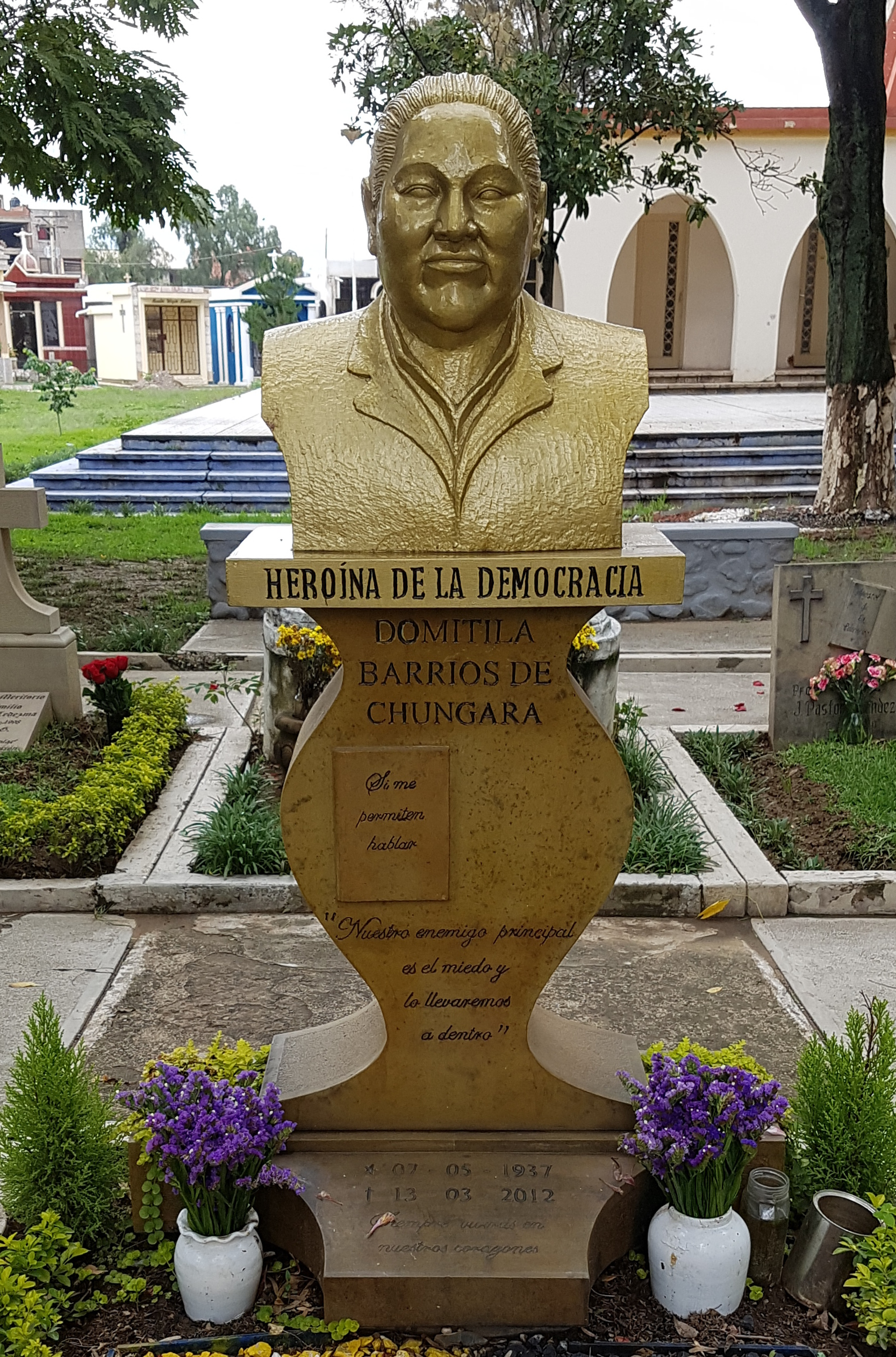
- Chungara's bust in the Cementerio General de Cochabamba, 2018
- Born: 7 May 1937; Pulacayo, Bolivia
- Died: March 13, 2012 (aged 74); Cochabamba, Bolivia
- Occupations: Labor leader, miner

Domitila Barrios de Chungara (7 May 1937 – 13 March 2012) was a Bolivian labor leader and feminist. In 1975 she participated in the International Women's Year Tribune put on by the United Nations in Mexico. She died in Cochabamba, Bolivia, on 13 March 2012 of lung cancer.

== Housewives' Committee ==
In 1961, seventy women organized the Housewives' Committee in the tin mine Siglo XX. They were the wives of miners who had demanded higher wages and been subsequently imprisoned in La Paz, about 200 miles from Siglo XX. One by one, these women went to La Paz to find their husbands, and, one by one, they returned demoralized. They decided go together to La Paz, and though they were confronted by the barzolas of the Revolutionary Nationalist Movement, their husbands' demands were met after the women staged a ten-day hunger strike. It was then that they created the Housewives' Committee. It was organized like a union and concerned little with Western feminism, though men were still initially hesitant to accept female leadership.

Domitila Barrios de Chungara would join the committee in 1963, leaving a community of Jehovah's Witnesses, which denounced the committee as a work of Satan. In 1964, General René Barrientos came to power in Bolivia. Barrientos issued a wage reduction, claiming the Corporación Minera de Bolivia (COMIBOL), the second-largest tin enterprise in the world, was bankrupt and everyone, including the army, would have to give up some of his or her wages. In May 1965, the Housewives' Committee issued a manifesto in protest. The leader of the Housewives' Committee, Líchen Oquendo, was arrested, and the husbands of the wives of the Housewives' Committee were deported. Líchen Oquendo would be replaced by Norberta de Aguilar, wife of an old company worker.

Through the Housewives' Committee, Domitila would organize the Committee of the Unemployed, representing women willing to work at the rock pile. These women would unknowingly be signed over to the leadership of a government agent, but Domitila would ensure their severance pay and established a co-op between the workers and the government.

In June 1967, the army staged a one-day massacre in Siglo XX. The San Juan Massacre resulted in the deaths of about 400 people in Siglo XX. The army had feared of a meeting of secretaries-general that was to take place the following day. Domitila denounced the massacre, and in a few days' time, she was arrested.

In 1975, Domitila returned from the International Women Year's Tribune and resumed as secretary general of the Housewives' Committee. The following May, at a miner's congress in Corocoro, it was decided that Housewives' Committees would be organized in all the mines and form the National Housewives' Federation. However, no such organization ever materialized.

In 1971, General Hugo Banzer forced his way into power. In his first years in office, Banzer tried to change the image of the government. As such, Domitila was offered a job working with the Ministry of the Interior, with wages higher than her husband's and benefits for her children. She declined, fearing that her image as a barzola would make others question the loyalty of the Housewives' Committee to the workers.

President Barrientos had outlawed the union, but when the decree of monetary devaluation came out, the Housewives' Committee demanded a raise in living allowance at the company grocery store. The women were tear gassed at the Plaza del Minero in Siglo XX in the midst of a demonstration. They proceeded to write a letter to the manager of COMIBOL, and when they had received no response, they gathered another demonstration in Catavi.

Domitila's work with the Housewives' Committee would lead to her arrest, her forced exile to Oruro and later to Los Yungas, because the military has suspected her of communist activity. She struggled with guilt over her involvement with the committee during her time in Los Yungas—over the loss of a child, her husbands' blacklist status, and moreover, her place as a woman. However, it was with the Housewives' Committee that Domitila would see herself as a leader, to sentence her children to death for the liberation struggle.

== Stance on Marx ==
In a situation of social, political, and economic deprivation, Domitila was driven by pro-Marxist political initiatives during the stint as the leader of the Housewives' Committee. Amongst the various reforms that she was looking to achieve, Domitila placed important focus on improving both miners' and peasants' conditions. Domitila was, among other things, a “revolutionary, a warrior, and a feminist” that rallied against the differences within class statures and bring a voice to the Bolivian lower class. Domitila went against the government and, more specifically, General Hugo Banzér Suárez to bring justice and equality to the needy.

In her much renowned autobiography, “Let Me Speak!”, Domitila Barrios de Chungara depicts the story of a woman who, through great injustices, was able to develop a political mindset that would change Bolivian social class' relations forever. Domitila's political career started when she first discovered that her voice could affect and, consequently, change people's lives. She began protecting the miners' and peasants' conditions by fighting against the increase on the price of rice and sugar. With the power of the radio, Domitila was able to defy the odds and critique the upper class for their complete oblivion to the disparity between classes.

Though her actions and 'attacks' against the status quo imposed by the higher class did bring her much trouble (Jail time, tortured, and lost a child), the loyalty to her values and political views is what garnished her unrivaled public support. In fact, her commitment to the Marxist political system was so evident that one of her most famous quotes paralleled a Marx idea:

Domitila: “For us, the first task doesn't consist in fighting against our companions, but with them changing the system in which we live for another, where men and women have the right to life, work and organization.”

Karl Marx: “The emancipation of the working class will only be achieved by the working class itself.”

Because of Domitila's resilient nature, she accumulated various enemies over the years. This, turn, only served to further incentivize her call for change within Bolivian society. In fact, many in the upper class have referred to Domitila's work (or political stance, rather) as “the work of Satan”. Unwilling to succumb to their insults and pressures, Domitila attacked back saying, “I began seeing how they were just one more group at the beck and call of imperialism. They said that we shouldn't get involved with politics, yet there in the temple they talked politics all the time.”

Once Domitila began studying and reading books that represented all different kinds of philosophies, she realized that her true values and philosophies lied within Marxism. “Those books were very helpful to me. At the same time I was able to assure myself of something that I'd dreamed about ever since I was little: that there is a world where there are no poor people and where everyone can have enough food to eat and clothes to wear. I saw that those ideas that I'd had were there in these books. And that everyone who worked had the right to eat and dress well. And the state had to look after old people, the sick, everyone. That seemed very beautiful to me. It was as if my thoughts as a little girl, well, as if someone had gathered them together and written them in a book. In other words, I identified fully with what I read about Marxism.”

Though Domitila did place much of her inspiration on Marx and other revolutionary thinkers, her guiding light —in a more peaceful manner— was 'Che' Guevara. In a sense, Domitila achieved what 'Che' Guevara was never able to fulfill in Bolivia: her fight became the people's fight, and the people triumphed. In the midst of her political career, Domitila gave one of her most famous quotes: “I want to leave future generations the only valid inheritance: a free country and social justice.”
