= Ukamau =

- Directed by: Jorge Sanjinés
- Written by: Jorge Sanjinés; Oscar Soria
- Produced by: Nicanor Jordán Castedo
- Starring: Vicente Veneros Salinas; Benedicta Mendoza Huanca; Néstor Cárdenas; Elsa Antequera
- Music by: Alberto Villalpando
- Production company: I.C.B. (Instituto Cinematográfico Boliviano)
- Release date: 1966
- Running time: 72 minutes
- Country: Bolivia
- Languages: Aymara, Spanish

Ukamau ("And so it is!" in Aymara language) is a 1966 black-and-white film directed by Jorge Sanjinés.

== Synopsis ==
Sabina (an amerindian woman) was raped by Rosendo Ramos (a mestizo man) and her husband Andrés Mayta wants revenge.

A native man goes elsewhere to sell his products. While he is away, his wife is raped. When he comes back, his wife tells him who the culprit is before she dies. He begins to look for opportunities to take revenge. Finally, the guilty man goes on a journey alone. The man whose wife was murdered goes after him.

The film presents sections on the social problems of the native people.

== Bibliography ==
- Movies featuring the Indigenous Peoples of Bolivia - "UKAMAU ¡Así Es! (And So It Is)", Nativeamericanfilms (in Spanish), Access date: 13 May 2022
- José Sánchez H.: The Art and Politics of Bolivian Cinema. Scarecrow Press, Lanham (Maryland) / London 1999. S. 82. ISBN 978-1-85566-106-6
- Jorge Sanjinés, Oscar Zambrano: Kino für das Volk – die bolivianische Erfahrung. In: Peter B. Schumann (Hrsg.): Kino und Kampf in Lateinamerika. Zur Theorie und Praxis des politischen Kinos. Carl Hanser Verlag, München 1976, S. 144–167, hier 147f. (in German)
- Las Banderas de Jorge Sanjinés: Ukamau (1966), Fernando Birri, Nuevo Texto Crítico, Volume 26-27, Number 49-50, 2013/2014, pp. 7–15 (Article) (in Spanish)
