= Dark Skull =

2016 film by Kiro Russo

- Film poster
- Directed by: Kiro Russo
- Written by: Kiro Russo
- Starring: Narciso Choquecallata
- Release date: 5 August 2016 (Locarno)
- Running time: 80 minutes
- Country: Bolivia
- Language: Spanish

Dark Skull (Spanish: Viejo calavera) is a 2016 Bolivian drama film directed by Kiro Russo. It was selected as the Bolivian entry for the Best Foreign Language Film at the 90th Academy Awards, but it was not nominated.

== Plot ==
Elder Mamani's immaturity and recklessness make him a liability as a Huanuni tin mine, where he's filled his recently deceased father's job. Elder spirals further out of control until his fellow workers petition to have him removed.

== Cast ==
- Narciso Choquecallata as Padrino Francisco
- Anastasia Daza López as Grandma Rosa
- Felix Espejo Espejo as Juan
- Israel Hurtado as Gallo

== See also ==
- List of submissions to the 90th Academy Awards for Best Foreign Language Film
- List of Bolivian submissions for the Academy Award for Best Foreign Language Film
