= José María Velasco Maidana =

Bolivian film director

- Born: 1899
- Died: 1989 (aged 89–90) Houston, Texas
- Occupation(s): director, conductor, composer

José María Velasco Maidana (c. 1899 – 1989) was a Bolivian film director, composer, conductor, actor, painter and dancer. He was the estranged son of a Bolivian president. He was married to Texas painter, Dorothy Hood.

Le Courrier describes his portrayal of indigenous Bolivians as shaped by the assimilationist ethos of his time, but also as progressive for the era, highlighting the condition of indigenous peoples, denouncing racism, and raising the question of their role in society.

Maidana is known for "his ballets and symphonic works, a number of which embrace national/native themes", but also for his films. He entered the cinema industry "at the very start of Bolivian fiction film production".

His first film, The Prophecy of the Lake (La profecía del lago), was made in 1925, on the heels of Bolivia's first ever fiction feature, Pedro Sambarino's Corazón Aymara (1925). The Prophecy of the Lake was a contemporary love story between an Aymara man and the daughter of a white landowner. The film was censored, for its "social critique" and "because it featured the love between a native man and a white woman", and was never shown. Velasco Maidana subsequently started his own production company, Urania. His next two films, Wara Wara (1930) and Hacia la Gloria (1931) were released in cinema as feature films, and Wara Wara remains "the only known surviving work from Bolivia's silent-film era". He also made short documentary films, "before returning to music".

From then on, he worked exclusively on music, and also left Bolivia to work abroad. Among his notable ballets is Amerindia (1940).

Maidana was introduced to Dorothy Hood in Mexico. He married Hood in 1946 and during that time, they traveled, following his conducting jobs which took them between Mexico City, New York and Houston, Texas.

In the 1960s, Maidana had to quit conducting because he was showing signs of Parkinson's disease. He and Hood moved to Houston for better medical care. He died in Houston in 1989.
