= Di buen día a papá =

2005 film

Di buen día a papá (English: Say Good Morning to Dad) is a 2005 Bolivian film directed by Fernando Vargas.
