= Erika Andia =

Bolivian theatre actress

- Born: Erika Noemí Andia Balcázar; 6 March 1972 (age 54); La Paz
- Education: Universidad Católica Boliviana
- Occupations: Journalist and actress

Erika Noemí Andia Balcázar (b. 6 March 1972) is a Bolivian theatre actress, director, and journalist.

== Biography ==
Erika Andia was born in La Paz, Bolivia on 6 March 1972, and completed her basic education in the city of her birth. She began studying theatre at the David Mondacca Workshop and she would continue pursuing higher education in social communication at the Catholic University of Bolivia, graduating years later as a journalist.

Andia entered the public conscious at 33 years of age with her performance as the drug trafficking Domitila in the 2005 film ¿Quién mató a la llamita blanca?, which premiered in the next year. Andia also played in the La Paz television productions Programa Z (2012) and El Sartenazo (2014). She would reprise her role in Programa Z as Clara for its sequel El SartenaZo.

In November 2017, Andia and Kory Warmis collaborated on the play Deja Vu, el corazón también recuerda in Sucre with a mostly female cast for the larger Mujeres en Camino project. Staging for the play took place at the Alberto Saavedra Pérez Municipal Theater at 8 November 2017 at 7:30 pm local time.
