= Juan Carlos Valdivia =

Chilean television presenter (born 1966)

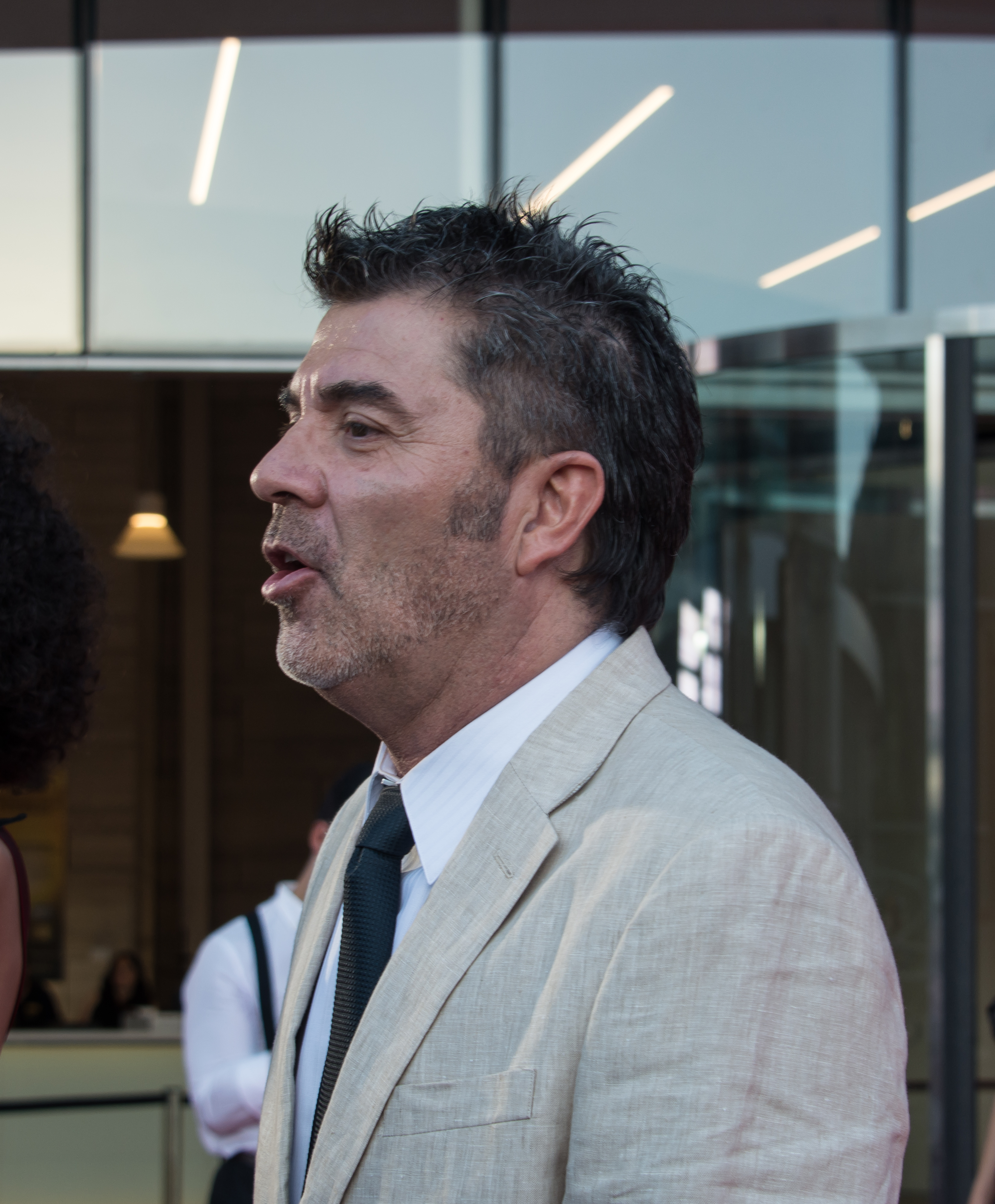

Personal details
- Born: 10 July 1966 (age 60) Santiago, Chile
- Height: 1.89 m (6 ft 2 1/2 in)
- Spouse: Claudia Conserva
- Children: One
- Education: Instituto Nacional General José Miguel Carrera; Pontifical Catholic University of Chile; Pontifical Catholic University of Valparaíso; University of Chile
- Occupation: Television presenter

Juan Carlos Valdivia Lena (born 10 July 1966) is a Chilean television presenter.

== Education ==
He studied his secondary education at the Instituto Nacional General José Miguel Carrera. His higher education began when he entered to study literature in Hispanic letters at the Pontificia Universidad Católica de Chile. He then studied law school at the Pontificia Universidad Católica de Valparaíso and finally he attended journalism at the University of Chile, careers. Afterwards, he devoted himself fully to television.

== Career ==
In 1990, he worked at Extra jóvenes of The Television Network of the University of Chile. Later he became the lead reporter. Around this time, he met Claudia Conserva, then queen of the Miss 17 pageant. The relationship matured to a marriage in 1995.

On August 28, 2004, Juan Carlos "Pollo" Valdivia and his wife Claudia Conserva started a new animated television show called Pollo en Conserva.
