= Le Courrier =

Newspaper

- Type: Daily newspaper
- Founded: 5 January 1868; 158 years ago
- Political alignment: Roman Catholic (1868–1996); Independent (since 1996)
- Language: French
- Headquarters: Geneva
- Country: Switzerland
- ISSN: 1424-1404
- OCLC number: 714986559
- Website: www.lecourrier.ch

Le Courrier (French pronunciation: [lə kuʁje], lit. 'The Mail'), formerly Courrier de Genève, is a Swiss French-language daily newspaper published in Geneva. Founded on 5 January 1868, it was originally supported by the Roman Catholic Church, but has been completely independent since 1996.

== History ==
Founded on 5 January 1868, it was originally financially supported by the Roman Catholic Church, and was created to defend Catholic interests in Geneva, otherwise largely protestant. Its original subtitle was Feuille religieuse et nationale. Initially it published weekly on Sundays, before becoming a daily in 1892. In 1923, it began focusing less on Catholic causes, before returning as the Church funded it. In 1966, it began collaborating with La Liberté, a Fribourg paper, from which it sources its national, international and economic news.

Since the early 1980s, it has been a humanist opinion paper with focuses on societal and Christian topics, and is left-wing politically. It has been completely independent from the Catholic Church since 1996. It is the only left-wing daily paper in Switzerland, and has support among trade unions. The paper has had several periods of financial issues and has sought donations from the public to remedy them. It is the only major paper in the region that was not owned by the Edipresse company.

In the 1970s, its circulation was about 9,000 copies. It had a circulation of 9,860 in 2000. It has been printed in Geneva since 2000.
