= Sexual Dependency (film) =

2003 film

- Directed by: Rodrigo Bellott
- Written by: Rodrigo Bellott; Lenelle N. Moise
- Produced by: Ara Katz; Rodrigo Bellott; Greg Leonarczyk; David Guy Levy
- Starring: Alexandra Aponte; Roberto Urbina; Jorge Antonio Saavedra; Ronica V. Reddick; Matthew Guida
- Cinematography: Rodrigo Bellott; Daryn De Luco
- Edited by: Adriana Pacheco
- Music by: John Dobry; Jeremiah Vancans
- Distributed by: Papillon Film
- Release date: 16 May 2003 (France)
- Running time: 105 minutes
- Country: Bolivia
- Languages: Spanish; English

Sexual Dependency (original Spanish title Dependencia sexual) is a Bolivian drama film by Rodrigo Bellott. It focuses on five young people just beginning to construct their sexual identity. Most of the actors featured were non-professional. It was Bolivia's entry to the foreign film category of the 76th Academy Awards.

== Awards ==
- Critics Prize, Locarno International Film Festival
- Special Mention Jeonju International Film Festival
- Nomination for Best Film, Golden Precolumbian Circle Bogota Film Festival
