= Corazón Aymara =

1925 film by Pedro Sambarino

- Directed by: Pedro Sambarino
- Written by: Ángel Salas
- Distributed by: Boliviana
- Release date: 1925
- Country: Bolivia
- Language: silent

Corazón Aymara (Aymara Heart) is a 1925 lost Bolivian silent feature film, directed by Pedro Sambarino.

== Production background ==
This film is generally described as Bolivia's first-ever fiction feature film. It portrays an Aymara woman struggling against accusations that she is unfaithful to her husband.

Jeff Himpele, in Circuits of Culture: Media, Politics, and Indigenous Identity in the Andes, places Corazón Aymara in the context of the Bolivian state's "indigenist project" of the 1920s and 1930s. Corazón Aymara, like José Maria Velasco Maidana's Wara Wara (1930), served as a "visual register of the modernization of the nation state" - thus, according to José Antonio Lucero of the University of Washington, "narrating a future of synthetic mestizo nation building". Lucero also notes that indigenous characters in the cinema of the time were orientalised and played by non-indigenous actors and actresses.

By contrast, historian Carlos Mesa, who founded Cinemateca Boliviana in 1976 and was its director until 1985, then served as President of Bolivia from 2003 to 2005, describes Corazón Aymara and Wara Wara as part of an "avant-garde intellectual and artistic movement" which promoted the role of indigenous Bolivians in the 1920s and 1930s.

== Preservation status ==
Corazón Aymara is a lost film, as there are no known copies of it in existence; Wara Wara is "the only known surviving work from Bolivia's silent-film era".

== See also ==
- List of lost films
