= Jorge Sanjinés =

Bolivian film director and screenwriter (born 1936)

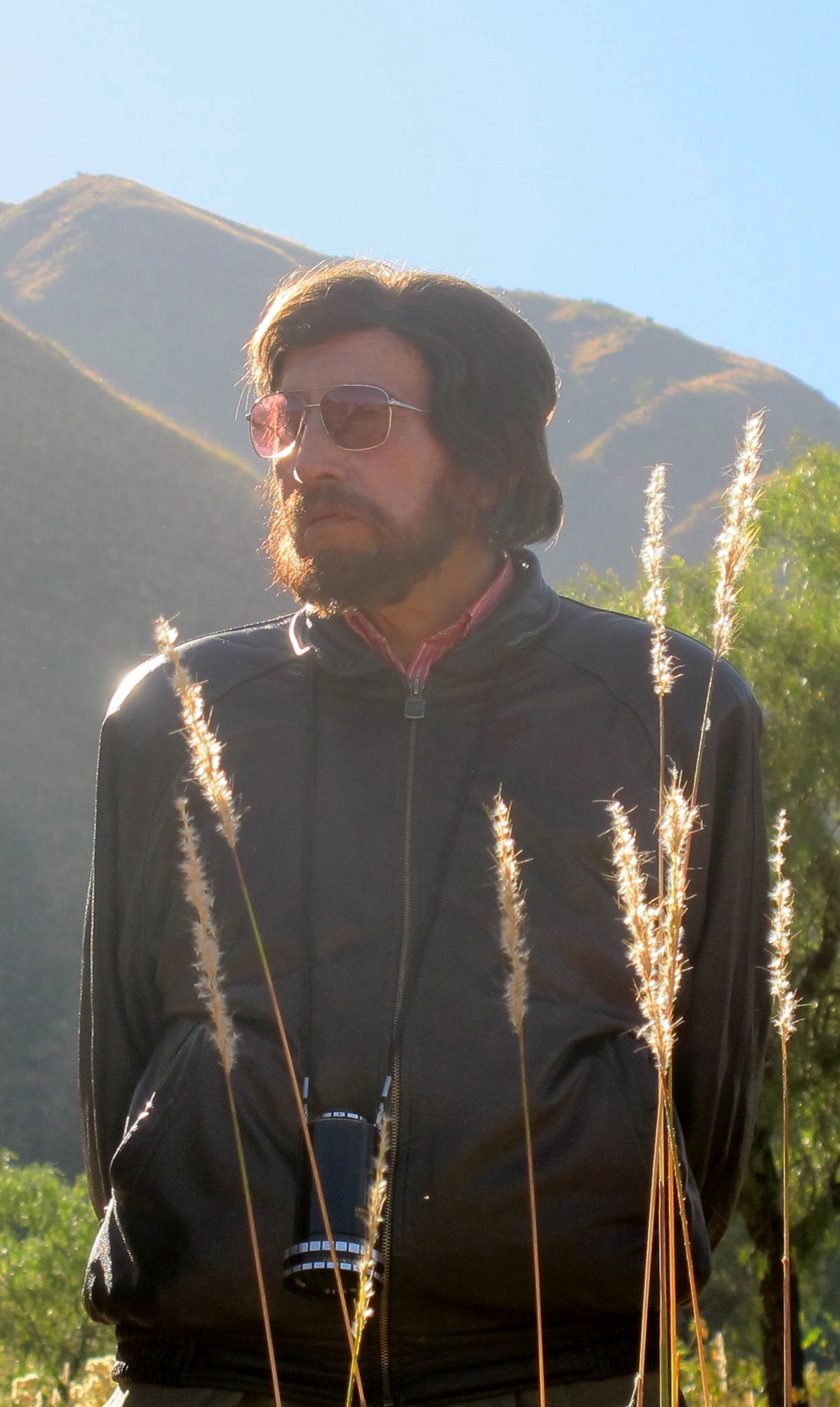
- Born: Jorge Sanjinés Aramayo; July 31, 1936 (age 90); La Paz, Bolivia
- Education: Higher University of San Andrés; Pontifical Catholic University of Chile
- Occupation: Filmmaker
- Years active: 1957–present
- Spouse: Beatriz Azurduy Palacios (died 2003)
- Website: jorgesanjines.org

Jorge Sanjinés Aramayo (born 31 July 1936) is a Bolivian film director and screenwriter. He founded the production group Grupo Ukamau. He won the ALBA Prize for Arts in 2009.

== Film career ==
Born in La Paz, Bolivia, Jorge Sanjinés brings highly political films of a revolutionary aesthetic to peasant and working-class audiences in the Andean highlands. The films that characterized the 'New Latin American Cinema' or Third Cinema provided an alternative to First (Capitalist) Cinema, making the social collective act as the protagonists of these films rather than an individual hero.

The 1969 film Blood of the Condor (Yawar Mallku) by Sanjinés reveals the story of the undisclosed sterilization of Andean Indian women by a "Progress Corps" (standing in for the American Peace Corps) clinic. This film is thought to have led to the expulsion of the Peace Corps from Bolivia in an act of anti-imperialist cultural nationalism by the indigenous people.

After showings of Yawar Mallku, Sanjinés learned that many peasants had criticised the complexity of his films due to the use of flashbacks for narration, as his film-making was greatly influenced by European art cinema and the lack of attention to denouncing the causes of the Indigenous peoples' issues. He took this into account when making his next film, called El coraje del pueblo (The Courage of the People), in 1971, about the Massacre of San Juan. El coraje del pueblo worked with untrained actors, many of them peasants themselves. This marked the beginning of a stage in Sanjinés's career characterized by filming "with the people."

His next film, El enemigo principal (1973), explores the effects of U.S. imperialism through the relationship between wealthy landowners and the indigenous peasant population.

In 1977, Sanjinés directed ¡Fuera de aquí!, the first feature film involving the Department of Cinema at the University of Los Andes (ULA) in Mérida (Venezuela), produced in co-production with the Ukamau Group and the Central University of Ecuador. The film was shot in Ecuador, with the participation of personnel from the ULA Department of Cinema, and edited in Mérida.

Jorge Sanjinés worked under strained film-making conditions, with limited funding, few production facilities, and little Bolivian movie tradition to draw upon.

== Problems of Form and Content in Revolutionary Cinema ==
"Problems of Form and Content in Revolutionary Cinema" is a film manifesto by Jorge Sanjinés in 1976 as a part of the Third Cinema Latin American film movement. This manifesto, along with Glauber Rocha’s “Aesthetic of Hunger” (1965), Julio García Espinosa’s "For an Imperfect Cinema" (1969), and "Toward a Third Cinema" (1969) by Fernando Solanas and Octavio Getino, is credited with creating the Third Cinema movement.

In line with other Third Cinema manifestos, Sanjinés advocates moving away from the Hollywood notion of Auteur cinema to a revolutionary filmmaking style intended to have a political impact.

In explaining the importance of revolutionary cinema, Sanjinés notes the importance of using film as a method of communication in expressing revolutionary concepts. He argues that film can be a good medium for these ideas because of its widespread communicability of film. Although advocating the use of film, he notes the importance of being careful when using such a capitalist concept.

We cannot attack imperialism's ideology by using its own formal tricks and dishonest techniques, whose raison d'être is to stupefy and deceive. Not only do such methods violate revolutionary morality, but they also correspond structurally to imperialism's ideology and content.

— Jorge Sanjinés

In the argument against Hollywood's notions of cinema, Sanjinés attempts to dissuade the use of individualism in film. As the Third Cinema is ultimately revolutionary in concept, Sanjinés says that revolutionary films must be a collective work.

As it matures, Revolutionary Cinema can only be collective, just as the revolution itself is collective.

— Jorge Sanjinés

The use of language and speech, as a revolutionary tool is talked about in depth in this manifesto. The idea of the script is challenged, Sanjinés instead advocates using only actors qualified to act out things based on their memory. An example of this is during the filming of The Courage of the People Sanjinés only used actors who could portray the depicted events as they themselves remember them.

The peasants used the filming to break the silence of oppression and speak openly.

— Jorge Sanjinés

Sanjinés continues to say that "Cinema and reality came together". This shows how Sanjinés views the importance of breaking free from traditional film structures to achieve a truthful and revolutionary final product

The final section of this manifesto talks about the problems of distributing revolutionary cinema and how it might seem futile to make a film if you have no means of distribution, but it is still important to make the film. Although many of these revolutionary films are undistributable where they could have the largest impact, Sanjinés tells of how there are other ways of distributing the film worldwide and advocates using these channels. Although anti-imperialist, Sanjinés advocates the viewing of his films to European and American audiences for educational purposes.

== Filmography ==
=== Short films ===
- Sueños y realidades (1962)
- Revolución (1963)

=== Feature films ===
- Ukamau, or And So It Is (1966)
- Yawar Mallku, or Blood of the Condor (1969)
- El coraje del pueblo, or The Courage of the People (1971)
- El enemigo principal, or The Principal Enemy (1974)
- Fuera de aquí, or Get out of Here! (1981)
- Las banderas del amanecer (1983)
- La nación clandestina (1989)
- Para recibir el canto de los pájaros (1995)
- Los hijos del último jardín (2004)
- Insurgentes (2012)
- Juana Azurduy "Guerrillera de la Patria Grande" (2016)
- Los Viejos Soldados (2024)

== See also ==
- Latin American cinema
- Third Cinema
- List of Bolivian films
- Film manifesto
