= Catholic-Hierarchy.org =

Online database of Catholic bishops and dioceses

- Website type: Legal/religious
- Available in: English
- Founded: 2002; 24 years ago
- Creator: David M. Cheney
- Website: www.catholic-hierarchy.org
- Commercial: No
- Current status: Active

Catholic-Hierarchy.org is an online database of bishops and dioceses of the Latin Church and the 23 Eastern Catholic Churches that are in full communion with Rome. The website, not officially sanctioned by the Church, is run as a private project by David M. Cheney in Kansas City.

== Origin and contents ==
In the 1990s, David M. Cheney created a simple internet website that documented the Catholic bishops in his home state of Texas—many of whom did not have webpages. In 2002, after moving to the Midwest, he officially created the present website catholic-hierarchy.org and expanded to cover the United States and eventually the world. The database contains geographical, organizational and address information on each Catholic diocese in the world, including Eastern Catholic Churches in full communion with the Holy See, such as the Maronite Catholic Church and the Syro-Malabar Church.

It also gives biographical information on current and previous bishops of each diocese, such as dates of birth, ordinations and (when applicable) death.

== Sources ==
Among the printed sources used are the Holy See publications: Annuario Pontificio, Acta Apostolicae Sedis and Acta Sanctae Sedis. Historical studies by authors whose surnames range from Andrade to Zúñíga are also utilized.

The Vatican Information Service provides news about changes affecting dioceses and bishops. Another primary source of informations for bishop's appointing, biographies and eventual resignations, has been the archive of the Holy See Daily Bulletin given by the Holy See Press Office, and the monthly official publication named Acta Sanctae Sedis (about members of the Roman Curia or Apostolic Nuncios).

== Status ==
The Zenit News Agency states that the webpage provides a "silent, unique service to the Church". The website is cited as a reference by Vatican Radio as well as by various diocese. academic institutions, libraries, newspapers (both mainstream and Catholic), and in published works. Vaticanologist Sandro Magister lists it as a recommended site on Catholicism. It is also used as a reference by other church writers including journalist John L. Allen Jr., canon lawyer Edward N. Peters, and commentator Rocco Palmo.
