= Bartoloni =

Bartoloni is an Italian surname. Notable people with the surname include:

- Bruno Bartoloni (1940–2024), Italian journalist and writer
- Cristian Bartoloni (born 1995), Argentinian rugby union player
- Riccardo Bartoloni (1885–1933), Italian prelate and diplomat of the Catholic Church
