= 2013 conclave =

Election of Catholic Pope Francis

Papal conclave March 2013

Dates and location
- 12–13 March 2013; Sistine Chapel, Apostolic Palace, Vatican City

Key officials
- Dean: Angelo Sodano
- Sub-dean: Roger Etchegaray
- Camerlengo: Tarcisio Bertone
- Protopriest: Paulo Evaristo Arns
- Protodeacon: Jean-Louis Tauran
- Secretary: Lorenzo Baldisseri

Election
- Electors: 115 (list)
- Candidates: See papabili
- Ballots: 5

Elected pope
- Jorge Mario Bergoglio; Name taken: Francis
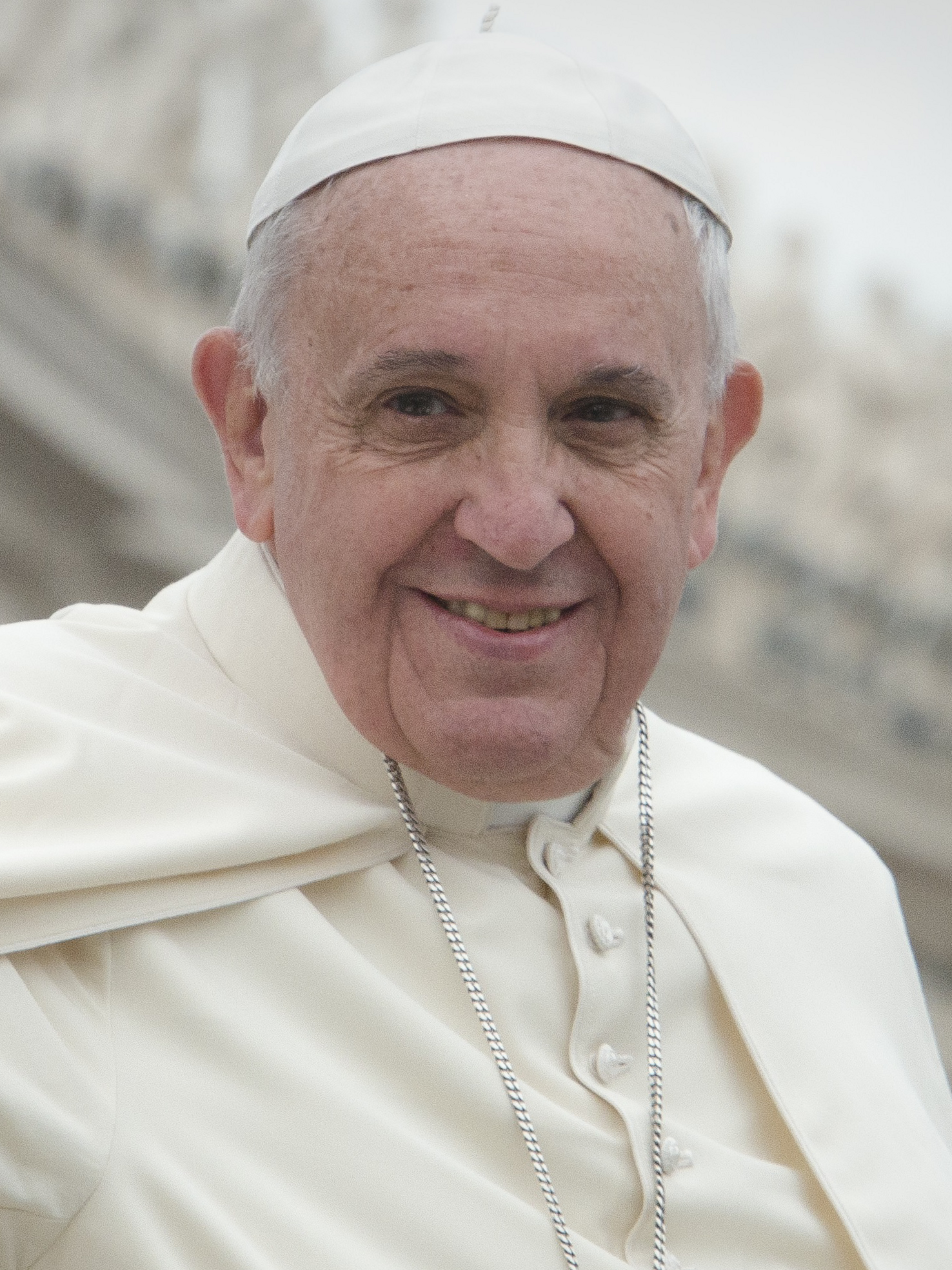

A conclave was held on 12 and 13 March 2013 to elect a new pope to succeed Benedict XVI, who had resigned on 28 February 2013. Of the 117 eligible cardinal electors, all but two attended. On the fifth ballot, the conclave elected Cardinal Jorge Mario Bergoglio, the archbishop of Buenos Aires. After accepting his election, he took the name Francis.

== Papal election process ==
The papal election process began soon after the resignation of Pope Benedict XVI on 28 February 2013. Since both Angelo Sodano and Roger Etchegaray, the dean and vice-dean of the College of Cardinals, respectively, were ineligible to participate in the conclave due to age, Giovanni Battista Re from Italy, the most senior cardinal bishop under 80, presided over the conclave.

=== Timing and rule change ===
In 1996, Pope John Paul II fixed the start date of the conclave at 15 to 20 days after the papacy became vacant in Universi Dominici gregis. The 2013 conclave was initially expected to start sometime between 15 and 20 March 2013. On 25 February, the Vatican confirmed that Pope Benedict XVI issued his apostolic letter Normas nonnullas to allow for a schedule change. This gave the College of Cardinals more latitude, once all of the cardinal electors had arrived in Rome, to start the conclave earlier or later. They scheduled the conclave to begin on 12 March.

Benedict XVI also amended the conclave law to provide for the automatic excommunication of any non-cardinal who breaks the absolute oath of secrecy. (Note: Under the prior rules, any such person who violated the duty of secrecy was subject to punishment at the discretion of the new pope.)

=== Cardinal electors ===
Cardinal electors by region
Graphic with the numbers of cardinal electors in attendance from each region
Region	Number
Italy	28
Rest of Europe	32
North America	20
South America	13
Asia	10
Oceania	1
Africa	11
Total	115

There were 207 cardinals on the day the papacy fell vacant. Cardinals who were 80 years or older before the day the papacy fell vacant were ineligible to participate, leaving 117 electors (including Walter Kasper, who turned 80 between the day the papacy became vacant and the start of the conclave). Two of them were the first cardinal electors from their churches to participate in a conclave: Maronite Patriarch Bechara Boutros al-Rahi (Note: Al-Rahi is the fourth Maronite Cardinal Bishop Patriarch. His predecessors turned 80 before having the opportunity to participate in a conclave.) and Syro-Malankara Major Archbishop Baselios Cleemis, the first bishop from the Syro-Malankara Church to be elevated to the College of Cardinals. (Note: Baselios Cleemis was also the youngest cardinal elector and the youngest member of the College of Cardinals.)

Two cardinal electors did not attend the conclave. Julius Darmaatmadja from Indonesia declined to attend because of progressive deterioration of his eyesight. Keith O'Brien, the only potential cardinal elector from Great Britain, (Note: The archdiocese of Cardinal Elector Seán Brady straddles the border between Northern Ireland, part of the UK, and the Republic of Ireland, and his seat is in Armagh, Northern Ireland, in the United Kingdom but not Great Britain.) had been accused of sexual misconduct towards priests in the 1980s and said he did not want his presence to create a distraction. He had resigned as Archbishop of St Andrews and Edinburgh on 18 February and later apologised for "sexual misconduct". With 115 cardinal electors participating, the same number of electors as the 2005 conclave, this conclave saw the largest number of cardinal electors ever to elect a pope, a number later surpassed by the 2025 conclave; accordingly, the required two-thirds majority needed to elect a pope was 77 votes.

== Speculation ==
The Los Angeles Times suggested that, though a pope from Latin America was unlikely, with only 19 of 117 cardinal electors being from Latin America, the region sought more say in the Vatican affairs, as it has the world's largest Catholic population. It cited secularism and the rise of Evangelical Protestantism in Latin America detracting from the Catholic faith, along with the sex abuse scandals in Mexico, Brazil, and Chile as issues important to the region. BBC News said that, while the balloting was likely going to be hard-fought between different factions for a European or a non-European, an Italian or a non-Italian future pope, the internal differences were unclear, and that many different priorities were at play, making this election exceedingly difficult to predict. Cardinal Cormac Murphy-O'Connor, who was not an elector, remarked laughingly to a BBC presenter that his colleagues have been telling him "Siamo confusi"—"We're confused", as there were neither clear blocs nor a front-runner.

One Australian commentator noted that the reform of the administrative machinery of the church, the Roman Curia, was a major issue, as there was no major progressive candidate, and indeed no clear front-runners, in the dynamic between the institutional-maintenance and evangelical Catholicism. Giacomo Galeazzi of La Stampa said: "Apparently, a sort of tsunami of non-European candidates will fall upon the Roman Curia, and this could take the pontificate far away from Rome, making it more international." Italian Cardinal Francesco Coccopalmerio said: "It's time to look outside Italy and Europe, in particular considering Latin America."

The dossier of the Vatican's internal investigation into the so-called Vatileaks scandal was called "in effect ... the 118th cardinal inside the conclave". (Note: After two cardinals announced that they would not be attending, the Italian media referred to the Vatileaks scandal as "the 116th cardinal".) Although the investigating cardinals (none of whom are cardinal electors) were free to discuss the results of their investigation with the participants of the conclave, the dossier itself was to be given by Pope Benedict XVI to his successor.

Cardinal Velasio De Paolis said that the presence of Cardinal Roger Mahony, former Archbishop of Los Angeles, in the conclave would be "troubling", but he also noted that the said cardinal "has the right and duty to take part", and "the rules must be followed". Mahony's successor in Los Angeles, Archbishop José Horacio Gómez, had recently rebuked Mahony for his handling of sex abuse cases, though he too, supported Mahony's participation in the conclave.

=== Papabili ===
Although the conclave cardinals may elect any baptized Catholic male, the last time a non-cardinal was elected pope was in the 1378 conclave. Observers of papal elections tend to consider, by a variety of criteria, some cardinals to be more likely to become pope than others – these are the papabili, the plural for papabile, an Italian word loosely translated as "pope-able". Since the set of papabili is a matter of speculation from the press, the election of a non-papabile is not uncommon; recent cases are John XXIII in 1958, and both John Paul I and John Paul II in 1978. This is reflected in the popular saying "He who enters the conclave as pope, leaves it as a cardinal."

Cardinals João Braz de Aviz, Angelo Bagnasco, Timothy Dolan, Péter Erdő, Seán Patrick O'Malley, Marc Ouellet, Gianfranco Ravasi, Óscar Rodríguez Maradiaga, Leonardo Sandri, Robert Sarah, Odilo Scherer, Christoph Schönborn, Angelo Scola, Luis Antonio Tagle, Peter Turkson, and Donald Wuerl were among the cardinals most often identified in press reports as those most likely to be elected. Scola, in particular, was considered such a front-runner that the Episcopal Conference of Italy had pre-drafted a press release concerning his election. However, Scola's ties to a corruption probe caused his perception by the fellow cardinals to decline drastically.

On 9 March, Cardinal André Vingt-Trois said there were around "half a dozen possible candidates". The next day, Cardinal Philippe Barbarin said: "There are three, four, maybe a dozen candidates." Cardinal Jorge Bergoglio of Argentina was seen as a papabile, though less likely (according to the public opinion) to emerge as pope. One summary of the likely candidates included Bergoglio because he was "rumoured to be the (weak) second place finisher" in the previous conclave but observed that "his 'moment' seems to be over". In addition, Bergoglio was seen as an older choice; he was 76 at the time of the conclave, and older than the rest of the papabili.

== Pre-conclave events ==
As soon as Benedict XVI announced his resignation, cardinals started arriving in Rome, and by the day the interregnum formally began, most of them had already arrived. A formal invitation to the conclave was issued on 1 March. The last of the 115 participating cardinal electors to arrive was Cardinal Jean-Baptiste Phạm Minh Mẫn of Ho Chi Minh City, Vietnam, who arrived on 7 March.

Gianfranco Ravasi of the Roman Curia, one of seventeen cardinal electors with Twitter accounts, suspended his social media presence on his own initiative at the beginning of the interregnum, while others posted their reactions as they assembled. (Note: Cardinal Roger Mahony of Los Angeles tweeted about the diversity of the Cardinals, many of whom were meeting each other for the first time.) The College of Cardinals later imposed a pre-conclave media and social media blackout, following leaks to the Italian press, which precluded some American cardinals from holding further press conferences. Some cardinal electors researched one another online.

=== General congregations ===
The first of several "general congregations" was held on the morning of 4 March to organise the event. The Sistine Chapel was closed to the public on 5 March in preparation for the conclave even before its date was set. To control communication with the outside world during the conclave, a Faraday cage blocking all outgoing and incoming communications was installed in the Sistine Chapel area. Contemporary media nevertheless gave journalists and other outsiders unprecedented access to this conclave. Approximately 5,600 journalists were accredited to cover the event.

The first congregation was held on the morning of 4 March and focused on introductory matters, picking three assistants to the camerlengo, the recent Synod of Bishops on the New Evangelization, and a suggestion for a message of appreciation to Pope Emeritus Benedict XVI. Thirteen cardinals gave speeches in the order they had requested to speak. The second congregation was held on the evening of 4 March and featured the preaching of the first of the two required meditations by Father Raniero Cantalamessa and nine more addresses.

The third congregation was held the morning of 5 March and featured 11 more addresses (all six continents had been represented at that time). The message of appreciation was sent, and the text of the guidelines for the conclave was read. Topics of discussion were: the activities of the Holy See in light of its relations with the world church's bishops, the course of the church's renewal after Vatican Council II, and the church's position in the world, especially regarding the New Evangelization. That evening, the Sistine Chapel closed and the furnaces were installed.

The fourth congregation was held on the morning of 6 March. The Liturgy of the Hours was prayed and three cardinals with birthdays were congratulated, then 18 more speeches (limited to five minutes) were given. All but two cardinal-electors were present and had taken the oath. The church in the world today and the needs of the New Evangelization, the status of the Holy See and of the Roman Curia's dicasteries (its departments: the congregations, the courts, and the pontifical councils, commissions, and academies), relations with bishops, and expectations of a future pope, were discussed. That evening, a prayer service was held at St. Peter's Basilica.

The fifth congregation was held the morning of 7 March. Three new cardinal assistants to the camerlengo were chosen. A telegram of condolence for the death of Venezuelan president Hugo Chávez was then read. Three separate speeches, each done by one of the three cardinal presidents of the three economic departments of the Holy See, were then given. Then, 13 more speeches were given, especially on ecumenism and the church's charitable efforts and attention to the poor, in addition to the topics from the previous meeting sessions.

The sixth congregation was scheduled for that evening. Some cardinals from the U.S. had stated in their interviews that the conclave might not begin until well into the following week, wanting the issues to be well-discussed. This also gave the non-Italian and non-curial cardinals the benefit of getting to know their Italian and curial counterparts, and especially their other colleagues worldwide, better, which may have lessened any disadvantage they may have had in voting.

On 7 March, reporters were shown images of preparation work, including the installation of the chimney. Cardinal Phạm Minh Mẫn was able to join the other 114 participating cardinal electors for the sixth general congregation the evening of 7 March. Seven more cardinals spoke; all 115 participating cardinal electors were present.

On 8 March, Lombardi announced that the cardinals would meet later that day and then announce the date for the start of the conclave, which they then set for 12 March. On 8 March, 153 cardinals, including all 115 participating electors, attended the seventh general congregation, where the cardinal dean announced that Cardinals Julius Riyadi Darmaatmadja and Keith O'Brien would not be joining the conclave despite being eligible to vote.

Having met the conditions set for beginning the conclave, the cardinals chose Cardinal Prosper Grech to give the meditation at the beginning of the conclave. Eighteen cardinals spoke, bringing the total number of interventions to over 100. In light of International Women's Day, one speech was about the role of women in the church. Other topics added in this session were: interreligious dialogue, bioethics, the church's role in promoting justice in the world, collegiality in the church, and the need for the church's evangelisers to proclaim the Gospel.

On 11 March, the day before the conclave, the non-cardinal officials, support staff and other non-voting personnel who had duties during the conclave took the oath of secrecy in the presence of Camerlengo Tarcisio Bertone as prescribed in Universi Dominici gregis as modified by Normas nonnullas. Among those taking the oath were the secretary of the College of Cardinals Archbishop Lorenzo Baldisseri (Note: As secretary of the College of Cardinals, Baldisseri was also designated to be the secretary for the cardinal-electors at the conclave) and the master of Pontifical Liturgical Celebrations Monsignor Guido Marini. Msgr. Marini himself led the oath takers in reading the oath out loud. The oath bound them to absolute secrecy on anything they observed during the conclave pertaining to the new pope's election unless they were explicitly granted special faculty by the new pope or his successors. The oath also bound them to refrain from using any audio or visual recording equipment and recording anything pertaining to the papal election during the conclave. The penalty for breaking the oath was automatic excommunication. The non-electors took their oath in Italian and in the Pauline Chapel.

== Conclave ==
=== Day one ===
On Tuesday, 12 March, the cardinals present in Rome, both voting and non-voting, gathered in St. Peter's Basilica in the morning to concelebrate the Mass pro eligendo Pontifice (lit. 'for the election of the Pontiff'). The dean of the College of Cardinals, Angelo Sodano, was the principal concelebrant and gave the homily. In the afternoon, the 115 cardinal electors assembled in the Pauline Chapel and walked in procession through the Sala Regia into the Sistine Chapel chanting the Litany of the Saints. After taking their places, the Veni Creator Spiritus ("Come, Creator Spirit") was sung. The oath was read aloud by the presiding cardinal, Giovanni Battista Re, Cardinal Bishop of Sabina-Poggio Mirteto, the most senior cardinal in attendance. As at the previous conclave, they would swear to observe the norms prescribed by John Paul II's apostolic constitution Universi Dominici gregis. In addition, they would swear to adhere to the rules prescribed by Benedict XVI in February. Then, each cardinal elector in order of seniority placed his hands on the Gospels and made the affirmation aloud in Latin.

Et ego [prænomen] Cardinalis [nomen] spondeo, voveo ac iuro. Sic me Deus adiuvet et haec Sancta Dei Evangelia, quae manu mea tango.

Translation:

And I, [forename] Cardinal [surname], do so promise, pledge, and swear. So help me God and these Holy Gospels, which I touch with my hand.

While making the oath, several cardinals used the Latin forms of their names. The four cardinals from the Eastern Catholic churches were distinguished by their attire. (Note: Antonios Naguib, Patriarch-Emeritus of the Coptic Catholic Church and Baselios Cleemis, Major-Archbishop of the Syro-Malankara Church wore predominantly black vestments. Maronite Patriarch Bechara Boutros al-Rahi and Syro-Malabar Major Archbishop George Alencherry wore all-red vestments. All the cardinals wore Latin church birette and/or zucchetti except for the four Eastern Catholic cardinals: Cardinal Alencherry wore a Nasrani biretta without a zucchetto; Cardinals al-Rahi and Cleemis wore different headgear; and Cardinal Naguib was bareheaded.) Cardinal Anthony Olubunmi Okogie of the Latin Church, the archbishop emeritus of Lagos, did not wear his mozzetta and was seated in a wheelchair through the procession and most of the proceedings but walked accompanied by an assistant and placed his hands on the gospels like the others when making the oath.

Monsignor Guido Marini, the papal master of ceremonies, called out the words Extra omnes ("Everybody out!"), and the doors of the chapel were locked to outsiders. Once the doors were closed, the cardinal electors heard the second required meditation for the conclave, given by Cardinal Grech, who then left the conclave because he was not an elector. After the meditation, one ballot was taken.

Black smoke coming out of the Sistine Chapel's chimney indicated to the outside world that on the first ballot no candidate had received the required two-thirds of the votes cast. According to several media accounts of the first vote, Scola and Ouellet led with roughly equal numbers of votes, Bergoglio was a close third, and the rest of the votes were scattered among several others. According to La Repubblica, Scola received approximately 35 votes to Bergoglio's 20 and Ouellet's 15, while another account said that Scherer had shown strength. Some cardinals later said that "When they woke up Wednesday morning, it wasn't clear to them they'd have a pope that night, and it was even less clear it would be Bergoglio."

=== Day two ===
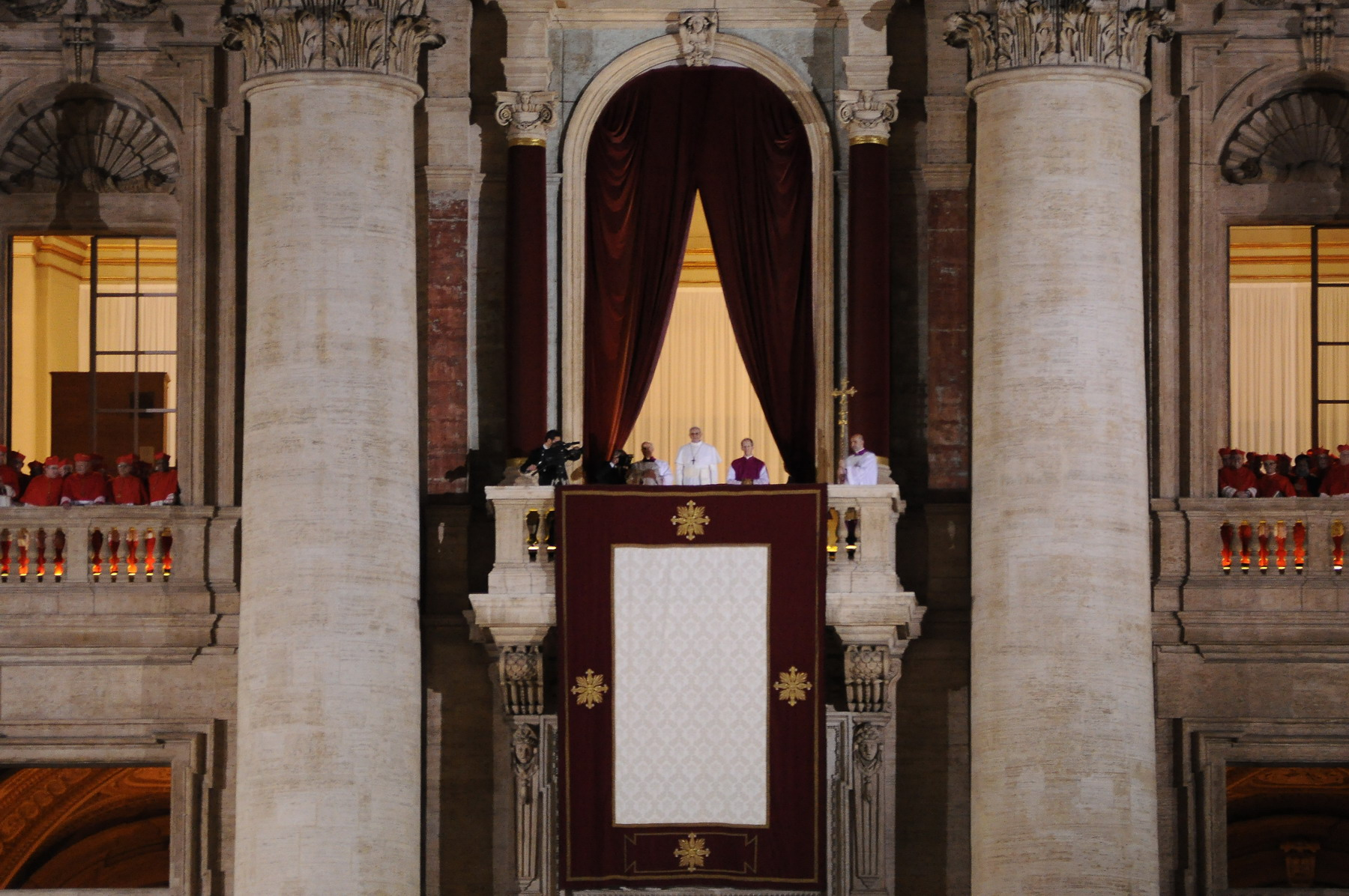
Pope Francis on the loggia of St. Peter's Basilica following his election

The two rounds of voting on the morning of 13 March 2013 proved inconclusive, and black smoke was again sent out. (Note: If there are two ballots at either time of day, they are burned together. Thus, there can be at most two smoke signals per day from the Sistine Chapel chimney.) Cardinal Scola's candidacy stalled going into Wednesday, and votes began to converge around the candidacies of Ouellet and Bergoglio. Sources report that, at some point, Cardinal Ouellet threw his support behind Bergoglio; by the first afternoon ballot—the fourth ballot of the conclave—Bergoglio became the clear front runner. On the fifth ballot, the cardinal electors, wishing to show a unified front, voted overwhelmingly in favour of Cardinal Jorge Bergoglio, reportedly giving him at least 90 votes, with the remaining 25 votes going to the other cardinals. Cardinal Seán Brady reported that applause broke out during the tabulation when Bergoglio's count reached the 77 votes required for election.

According to Cardinal Wilfrid Napier, when Bergoglio was asked whether he would accept his election, he said: "Although I am a sinner, I accept." He took the name Francis, in honour of Saint Francis of Assisi. He later said that, while Bergoglio was choosing his papal name, some cardinal-electors jokingly suggested he should choose either "Adrian" after the great reformer Pope Adrian VI, or "Clement" out of revenge against Pope Clement XIV, who suppressed the Jesuit order. At the conclusion of the conclave, Francis gave his cardinal's zucchetto to Archbishop Lorenzo Baldisseri, the non-elector secretary of the conclave. (Note: Traditionally if the new pope gave the conclave secretary his zucchetto it signalled he would name him a cardinal in the next consistory. This old tradition had last been practised by Pope John XXIII in 1958, when he placed his zucchetto on the head of Monsignor Alberto di Jorio, who was secretary of the conclave, and made him a cardinal in December of that year. Pope Francis included Baldisseri in the first group of cardinals he created on 22 February 2014.)

At 19:06 CET (18:06 UTC), white smoke and the sounding of the bells of St. Peter's Basilica signalled that a pope had been chosen and shortly thereafter the Vatican web site was changed to say "Habemus papam!" ("We have a pope!").

Cardinal Protodeacon Jean-Louis Tauran appeared on the central balcony of St. Peter's Basilica and announced the election of the new pope and his chosen name. Pope Francis appeared and asked the people to pray for both him and Benedict XVI, before he delivered the Urbi et Orbi blessing, at which point the conclave concluded.

== Post-conclave events ==
A half-hour later, the Twitter account @Pontifex sent out a tweet that read "HABEMUS PAPAM FRANCISCUM".

At 20:23 CET, the Italian Conference of Bishops released a statement erroneously congratulating Cardinal Angelo Scola of Milan on his election as pope. A corrected statement was released at 21:09 CET. As cardinals described the voting process, carefully suppressing details so as not to violate their oath of secrecy, one offered this assessment that "Scola might have won" and "is obviously qualified to be pope", but there was "a very strong bias against the Italians". He added: "There was a sense that the Italians aren't up to the job anymore [sic]. They used to be so good, but lately they seem to have lost control of things." Commentators nonetheless noted that the election of Bergoglio was favoured by the fact that he was an Italian Argentine and as such fitting multiple requirements that made him likely to have support from Italian cardinals looking for candidates outside of Europe.

Pope Francis celebrated his inauguration on 19 March 2013 and was installed as Bishop of Rome on 7 April.

=== Surveillance speculation ===
In October 2013, the Italian weekly magazine Panorama claimed that the United States National Security Agency had targeted cardinals in the conclave for surveillance, including Cardinal Bergoglio. An NSA spokesperson denied this.

== Results as speculated by Gerald O'Connell ==
According to the journalist and Vatican expert and correspondent Gerard O'Connell in his book The Election of Pope Francis: An Inside Account of the Conclave That Changed History, this is what he reckons the results of the ballots would have been:

=== Evening of 12 March ===
==== First ballot ====
Cardinals	Votes
Angelo Scola	30
Jorge Bergoglio	26
Marc Ouellet	22
Seán Patrick O'Malley	10
Odilo Scherer	4
Others	23

=== Morning of 13 March ===
==== Second ballot ====
Cardinals	Votes
Jorge Bergoglio	45
Angelo Scola	38
Marc Ouellet	24
Others	8

==== Third ballot ====
Cardinals	Votes
Jorge Bergoglio	56
Angelo Scola	41
Marc Ouellet	15
Others	3

=== Afternoon of 13 March ===
==== Fourth ballot ====
Cardinals	Votes
Jorge Bergoglio	67
Angelo Scola	32
Marc Ouellet	13
Others	3

==== Fifth ballot ====
Cardinals	Votes
Jorge Bergoglio	85
Angelo Scola	20
Marc Ouellet	8
Others	2
