= Aeterni Patris (disambiguation) =

Aeterni Patris may refer to:

- Aeterni Patris Filius, a 1621 papal bull regulating papal conclaves
- Aeterni Patris, an 1868 papal bull summoning the First Vatican Council
- Aeterni Patris, an 1879 encyclical letter of Pope Leo XIII
