= Palmo =

Palmo may refer to:

- Tenzin Palmo, Tibetan Buddhist nun
- Sister Palmo, Tibetan Buddhist nun
- Rocco Palmo, Catholic writer, columnist, and commentator
- Palmo (unit of measurement), a Spanish anthropic unit of length
- Palmo, the capital city of the planet Ghorman in the second season of Andor (2025)
