= Aeterni Patris Filius =

Papal bull

Aeterni Patris Filius (English: Son of the Eternal Father), also called Aeterni Patris, was a bull issued by Pope Gregory XV on 15 November 1621 that regulated papal conclaves. Together with the bull Decet Romanum pontificem of 1622, it formed the canonical basis for papal elections until the 20th century. The bull brought about many reforms to the papal election system, created structured rules, and sought to decrease the influence of organized factions within the College of Cardinals during the conclave as well as decrease the influence of secular monarchs on papal elections. It established general rules for the conclave process, while the later bull Decet Romanum pontificem addressed the ceremonial aspects of papal elections.

== Background ==
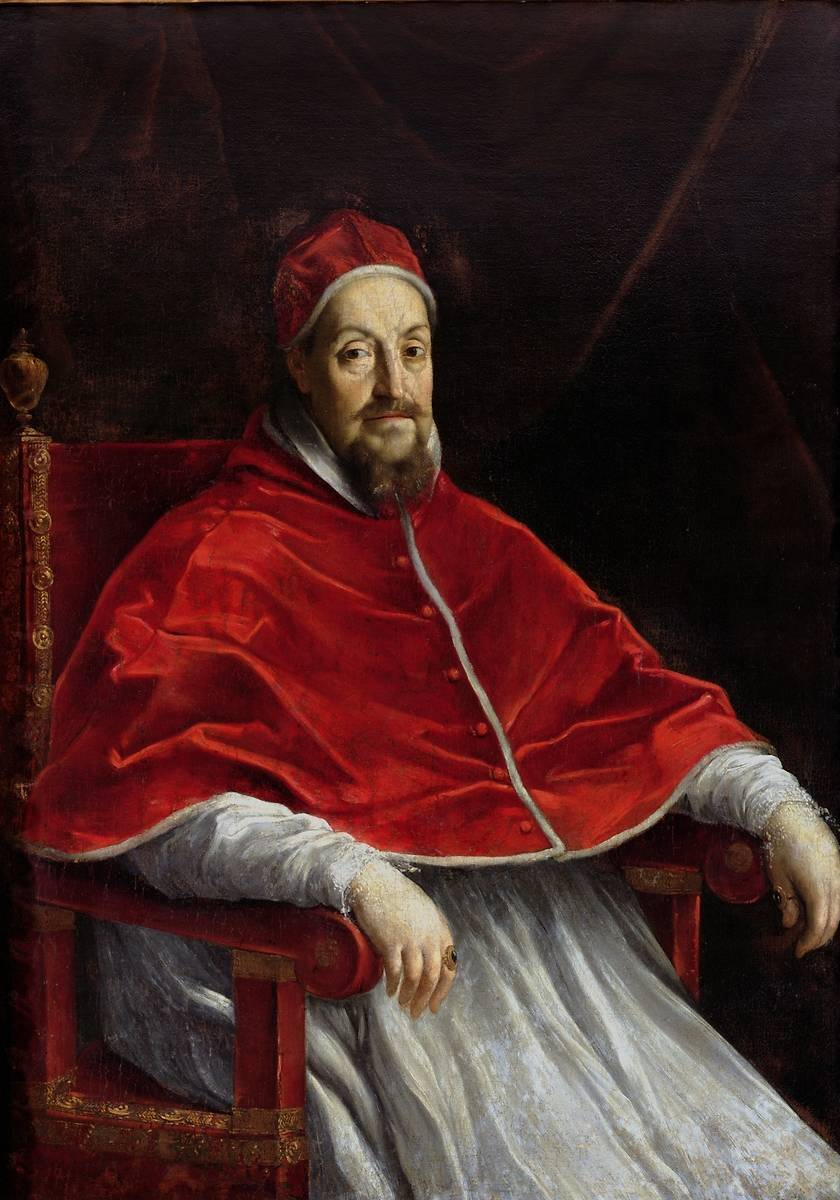
Pope Gregory XV issued the bull

Conclave reform had been a topic that most popes since Pope Julius II had been engaged in, but to little impact because most often the pope would die before being able to issue a bull containing reforms. Contemporary sources present Aeterni Patris Filius as being the culmination of reforms started by Julius with his constitution Cum tam divino in 1505 and continued by other popes, but more recent scholarship has questioned whether there is full continuity between the various conclave reform efforts.

Gregory sought wide input from the reforms, and heard arguments from Robert Bellarmine and Federico Borromeo, who advocated for an end to election by acclamation because it made it impossible to determine how many votes were cast and prevented secrecy in the elections. Other more radical reforms were suggested, including a plan where the conclave would take place in front of the deceased pope's body, and only the top six candidates from the first round could be voted on in future scrutinies with a successive candidate being dropped each day if a pope was not elected. While this plan was seen as having an advantage of lasting at most a week, Gregory ultimately rejected it as being too radical.

== Reforms ==
Gregory instituted the rule that to win election by scrutiny, a candidate must secure two-thirds of the votes of the electors in the conclave in a secret ballot. This reform decreased the power of the leaders of individual factions in the conclave and angered many Catholic monarchs.

Gregory did not eliminate election by acclamation as Bellarmine and Borromeo sought, but he did make it impossible without first taking a secret ballot, and the rules set forth in the bull anticipated election by a written secret ballot. Before casting their votes, cardinals were required to take an oath swearing to vote for an individual they believed to be worthy of the papacy and to write their votes on pieces of paper that contained the words "I choose as Supreme Pontiff my Lord Cardinal..." These oaths were intended to prevent cardinals from voting for their friends or casting joke ballots, while the wording of the paper ballots set the expectation that the next pope would be a cardinal, even though Aeterni Patris Filius did not explicitly prohibit the electors from voting for non-members of the College.

These reforms, together with Gregory's 1622 bull Decet Romanum pontificem, formed the basis of papal elections until the 20th century, when every pope except Benedict XV and John Paul I made changes to the rules governing papal elections.

== See also ==
- Romano Pontifici eligendo
- Universi Dominici gregis
