= Vaticanology =

Study of the operations of the Holy See and Roman Catholic Church

Vaticanology is a term coined in the 20th century to describe the field of journalism and research studying and reporting about how the Holy See and the Roman Catholic Church operate. It is named after the Vatican City, the Holy See's sovereign territory enclaved within Rome, Italy. Particular emphasis tend to be placed on the selection and appointment mechanisms by which the Church's leadership emerges.

A journalist or scholar focusing on this area of expertise is sometimes referred to as a Vaticanologist, Vaticanist, or Vatican watcher.

== Origin and history ==
It owes its origins to the term Kremlinologist, which was used to describe media, academic and commentary experts who followed the function of the Communist Party of the Soviet Union in general and the functioning and selection of the leadership elite in particular. Both the Kremlin and the Holy See operated in a great degree of secrecy and mystery, hence the attention paid to "experts" who were presumed to be able to read subtle nuances indicating who was on the "way up", who was on the "way down" and who were the "ones to watch" within their leadership elites.

Famous Vaticanologists include the author and commentator Peter Hebblethwaite, who wrote biographies of (among others) Pope John XXIII and Pope Paul VI, as well as a best-selling account of the events of 1978 in Year of Three Popes. Robert Blair Kaiser was a noted contributor in the field, who did much reporting on the Second Vatican Council for TIME. For the 2005 papal conclave, the first papal conclave in the age of the continuous news cycle and the Internet, many Vaticanologists became prominent through their wide dissemination both on television and in online publications. Blogs have become a popular means for amateur Vatican watchers to share their thoughts and insights.

== List of recent Vaticanologists ==
- Ed Condon and J.D. Flynn, The Pillar
- John L. Allen Jr., Crux Now
- Matthew Bunson, EWTN and National Catholic Register
- Bruno Bartoloni
- Gerson Camarotti, Globo News
- Massimo Franco, Corriere della Sera
- Eric Frattini, Mauri Spagnol Group, Sperling & Kupfer
- Delia Gallagher, CNN's Faith and Values correspondent
- Michael Hewitt-Gleeson, popelucianischool.net
- Robert Hutchinson, author of When in Rome: A Journal of Life in Vatican City
- Sandro Magister, L'Espresso
- Vasin Manasurangul, Pope Report
- George Menachery, Vatican Adventure
- Robert Mickens, globalpulse.com
- Frédéric Mounier, La Croix
- Robert Moynihan, Inside the Vatican
- Gerard O'Connell, America
- Rocco Palmo, Whispers in the Loggia
- Catherine Pepinster, The Tablet
- Elisabetta Piqué, La Nación
- Marco Politi, La Repubblica
- Philip Pullela, Reuters
- Peter Steinfels, The New York Times
- Damian Thompson, The Catholic Herald
- Andrea Tornielli, Il Giornale, La Stampa
- Paul Vallely, papal biographer, Pope Francis – Untying the Knots
- Giancarlo Zizola, Le Monde
