= Peter Hebblethwaite =

British Jesuit priest, writer, and journalist (1930–1994)

- Born: 30 September 1930; Ashton-under-Lyne, Lancashire, England, UK
- Died: 18 December 1994 (aged 64); Oxford, Oxfordshire, England, UK
- Other name: Robert Myddleton (in The Tablet)
- Education: Xaverian College; Jesuit novitiate
- Alma mater: Xaverian College
- Occupations: Jesuit priest, editor, journalist
- Notable credit(s): The Month, The Tablet, The Observer, National Catholic Reporter
- Spouse: Margaret Speaight (m. 1974)

Peter Hebblethwaite (30 September 1930 – 18 December 1994) was a British Jesuit priest and writer. After leaving the priesthood, he became an editor, journalist ('Vaticanologist') and biographer.

== Life ==
Hebblethwaite was born in Ashton-under-Lyne, Lancashire, the son of Charles and Elsie Ann Hebblethwaite. He was educated at the parish primary school of St Anne's, Ashton-under-Lyne, and Xaverian College, Manchester.

Hebblethwaite entered the Jesuit novitiate in 1948, and later studied in England and France. He was ordained a priest in 1963. Two years later he joined the staff of the Jesuit magazine The Month, covering the final session of the Second Vatican Council.

In 1967 he was appointed editor of The Month, a post he held until leaving the priesthood to marry Margaret Speaight (born 1951, London), a British writer, journalist, activist and religious worker. The couple wed in 1974 and had three children.

From 1976 to 1979, he taught French at Wadham College, Oxford, specialising in the work of Catholic writer Georges Bernanos, before launching himself as a freelance journalist, concentrating on Catholic affairs and the Vatican in particular. He was the Vatican correspondent for the American liberal Catholic weekly National Catholic Reporter from 1979 to 1981. He was a journalist on Vatican affairs (regarded by some during his lifetime as the leading English-language Vaticanologist).

Hebblethwaite gained esteem as an author whose style was calm, scholarly and witty. His numerous books introduced him to a wider public. The Runaway Church (1975) looked at the changes in the Catholic Church since the Second Vatican Council. The Year of Three Popes covered the dramatic papal events of 1978, and was later followed by two papal biographies: John XXIII: Pope of the Council appeared in 1984 and Paul VI: The First Modern Pope in 1993.

== Death ==
Peter Hebblethwaite died in Oxford on 18 December 1994, aged 64.

== Publications ==
=== Books ===
- Bernanos: An introduction (Studies in modern European literature and thought series). London: Bowes & Bowes, 1965.
- Understanding the Synod. Dublin and Sydney: Gill & Son, 1968.
- The Runaway Church. London: Collins, 1975. ISBN 0-00-211648-0
- The Christian-Marxist Dialogue: beginnings, present status, and beyond. London: Darton, Longman and Todd, 1977. ISBN 0-232-51390-2
- The Year of Three Popes. London: Collins, 1978. ISBN 0-00-215047-6
- with Ludwig Kaufmann, John Paul II: A Pictorial Biography. New York: McGraw-Hill, c1979. ISBN 0-07-033327-0 (hbk.), ISBN 0-07-033328-9 (pbk.)
- The New Inquisition? Schillebeeckx and Küng. London: Fount Paperbacks, 1980. ISBN 0-00-626106-X
- The Papal Year. London: Chapman, 1981. ISBN 0-225-66297-3
- Introducing John Paul II: The Populist Pope. London: Collins / Fount, 1982. ISBN 0-00-626346-1
- John XXIII: Pope of the Council. London: Chapman, 1984. ISBN 0-225-66419-4 Revised edition Fount Paperbacks, 1994. Abridged edition Continuum, 2000.
- Synod Extraordinary: The Inside Story of the Rome Synod November–December 1985. London: Darton, Longman and Todd, 1986. ISBN 0-232-51665-0
- In the Vatican. London: Sidgwick & Jackson, 1986. ISBN 0-283-99324-3
- Paul VI: The First Modern Pope. London: HarperCollins, 1993. ISBN 0-00-215658-X
- The Next Pope: An Enquiry. London: Fount, 1995. ISBN 0-00-627831-0 (reissued in 2000 with the subtitle "A Behind-The-Scenes Look at the Forces That Will Choose the Successor to John Paul II and Decide the Future of the Catholic Church". ISBN 0-00-628160-5)

=== Pamphlets ===
- Changes in the Church?. London: Catholic Truth Society, 1967.
- What the Council Says about Cultural Values. London: Catholic Truth Society, 1968.
- The Theology of the Church. Theology Today no. 8. Notre Dame, Ind.: Fides Publishers, 1969.
- Some Aspects of Revisionist Thinking. Boston College Studies in Philosophy 2. Boston: Boston College, 1969.
- Pope John Paul II, the Gulf War and the Catholic tradition. Oxford Project for Peace Studies paper no.31. Oxford: Oxford Project for Peace Studies, 1992. ISBN 1-871191-31-9

=== Translations ===
- Ladislaus Boros, Breaking Through to God: The Way of the Cross. London: Darton, Longman and Todd, 1973. (from German) ISBN 0-232-51222-1
- Pierre de Calan, Cosmas, or, The Love of God. London: Collins, 1980. (from French) ISBN 0-00-222118-7

== Obituaries ==
- The Times, 19 December 1994.
- The Guardian, 19 December 1994.
- The Daily Telegraph, 19 December 1994.
