= Delia Gallagher =

American journalist based in Rome (born 1970)

Delia Buckley Gallagher (born March 11, 1970) is an American journalist based in Rome who currently serves as the Senior Editor for Inside the Vatican magazine. She formerly served as CNN's Faith and Values Correspondent. Gallagher was a long time CNN Vatican Analyst, Vaticanologist, and religious journalist based in New York. Prior to joining CNN full time, she lived in Rome for 7 years. In Rome, she wrote a weekly column for Zenit News Agency and was a contributing editor for the magazine. The History Channel Documentary, "Angels and Demons Decoded" released by A & E Television Networks profiled Gallagher commenting on Dan Brown's bestseller book which was made into a movie. Subsequently, Gallagher moderated the Angels and Demons movie press conference film debut in Rome on stage with Tom Hanks, Ron Howard and Dan Brown often speaking in Italian and English. She knew Pope Benedict XVI personally and travelled extensively with John Paul II, including his last trip to Poland. Upon the death of Pope John Paul II, she broadcast and commented for CNN Worldwide covering the unfolding event.

== Early years and education ==
Delia Gallagher's parents are Irish immigrants from Counties Kerry and Donegal. They met in the U.S. and married in Ireland in 1969. Delia was born in San Francisco a year later. She grew up in nearby San Jose, where her parents still reside. With four younger brothers, Delia is the oldest of five children.

Gallagher attended St. Joseph of Cupertino School, then attended the college preparatory school of Saint Lawrence Academy. Delia earned her undergraduate degree at the University of San Francisco (where she was an editor of The Foghorn, the school newspaper). She then attended Blackfriars, Oxford University (founded by the Dominican Order), where she got her MPhil in Theology. Gallagher speaks fluent Italian and conversational French.

== Pre-CNN Life ==
While still in college, Gallagher started working part-time as a writer at KCBS San Francisco. She later joined the AM News Radio station full-time after graduation. Her former colleagues described her as "extremely nice, focused, and hard working."

After graduate school, Delia joined the Oxford University Press (OUP) as a researcher and editor. Her work involved being part of the team that produced the Dead Sea Scrolls CD-ROM. She moved to Rome in 1998 and started as a writer for Inside the Vatican. As a member of the Vatican Press Corp, she traveled with Pope John Paul II to Croatia, Poland, Slovakia, Spain, and Italy. She also wrote a weekly column for the Zenit News Agency called "Rome Notes.", and has followed for CNN the 2002 Molise earthquake. Gallagher lived in the Roman neighborhood of Parioli.

== CNN Life ==
After taking the position of Faith and Values Correspondent in September 2005, Gallagher reported on a wide range of topics for the television network. Some of her work included reports for Vatican Rules on Homosexuality and the Priesthood, Hassidic Jews in Brooklyn, and Intelligent Design. She also hosted a highly rated two-hour special entitled The Last Days of Pope John Paul II: The Untold Stories, which aired on the first anniversary of the pope's death. Alongside these examples of her work, she has also done an interview with the author Anne Rice. Delia appeared regularly on CNN as an expert on religious matters. Most recently, her expertise was consulted on Pope Benedict XVI's first encyclical, Deus caritas est. She was a regular contributor to "On the Story" and a frequent guest on Lou Dobbs, CNN Newsroom, and Anderson Cooper 360.

=== Recent written work ===
2006.03.30 A Peek Through the Vatican Curtains (CNN)
2006.03.30 A Pope's Last Request: "Read me the Bible" (CNN)
2004.09.04 Holy House of Loreto; New Saints; Marvelli and Suriano (Zenit)
2004.08.26 An Icon the Pope Hoped to Deliver Personally (Zenit)
2004.08.19 Cardinal Poupard on Inculturation; Olympic Peace (Zenit)
