= Quia propter =

1215 document on papal elections

Quia propter (Latin: "Wherefore by…") was a document issued by the Fourth Lateran Council in 1215 on the subject of papal elections. It recognized three processes for unanimous agreement: "acclamation", "scrutiny" (balloting), and "compromissum" (compromise committee).

Acclamation was rare, and often driven more by crowd dynamics than discussion among the electors. Compromise committees were also rare, as they required unanimous agreement to be initiated (although, once formed, only two-thirds of the commission would be required). The requisite majority by balloting was considered a process for determining divine unanimity, that is, sanior et maior pars (Latin: sounder and greater part). The requirement of a two-thirds supermajority had been in place since the Third Lateran Council (1179), which followed the disputed election of Pope Alexander III.
