= Papal election reforms of Pope Benedict XVI =

2013 changes to the election of popes

In the course of his papacy, Benedict XVI (r. 2005–2013) issued two documents altering certain details of the procedures for electing a pope: De electione Romani Pontificis on 11 June 2007 and Normas nonnullas on 22 February 2013. These instructions amended the extensive set of rules and procedures issued on 22 February 1996 by his predecessor John Paul II in his apostolic constitution Universi Dominici gregis.

Benedict reversed or modified some innovations John Paul had instituted that dealt with procedures to be followed if a papal conclave lasted more than two weeks. He also modified the cardinals' authority to set the start date of a conclave and tightened the punishment for support personnel who violate their oath of secrecy.

== Instructions ==
=== De electione Romani Pontificis ===
John Paul's 1996 rules had introduced some "radical" innovations that allowed the cardinal electors, after 33 ballots (not counting any ballot taken on the first day of the conclave), to determine by majority vote how to proceed, allowing them to lower the majority needed for election from two-thirds of those voting to as little as a simple majority, and allowing them to restrict the balloting to the candidates who had received the most votes in the preceding ballot. John Paul had then received "more than a few requests" (haud paucae petitiones), according to Benedict, to restore the traditional requirement of a two-thirds majority. The two-thirds majority requirement had been established by the Third Lateran Council in 1179.

Since participants in a conclave are bound by an oath of secrecy, the impact of these changes on the one conclave where they controlled is unknowable. Observers imagine two opposite effects. During the 2005 conclave, once the votes for Cardinal Joseph Ratzinger exceeded a simple majority, his supporters knew they could continue voting for him until they were able to institute the simple majority rule that John Paul allowed. On the other hand, it is questionable whether Ratzinger would have accepted election on such terms, as the first pope in centuries with the support of a bare majority of the electors.

Benedict issued De aliquibus mutationibus in normis de electione Romani Pontificis on 11 June 2007 after two years as pope. In this five-paragraph document, Benedict denied the cardinal electors the options John Paul had allowed them and retained only John Paul's determination that a change was required after many ballots had failed to produce a result. He restored the two-thirds majority rule. He established the procedure that after 33 ballots (still excluding the first day's ballot if any), additional ballots would allow voting only for the two candidates with the greatest number of votes in the preceding ballot, and he excluded those two candidates from participation in the balloting.

=== Normas nonnullas ===
Benedict resigned the papacy on 11 February 2013, effective 28 February. On 22 February, he issued his second set of instructions on the papal election process, Normas nonnullas. Following his resignation, cardinals had questioned the rule that they delay starting the conclave until 15 days after the papacy fell vacant. Particularly since unlike a conclave following a pope's death, a subsequent papal funeral was not required to be held first. Benedict allowed them to begin earlier "if all the cardinal electors are present" while keeping their ability to delay the start until 20 days pass "for serious reasons". He modified the oath of secrecy to be taken by all support personnel, making excommunication the automatic punishment (latae sententiae) for violations of the oath, which had previously been punished at the discretion of the new pope.

The cardinals began meeting in general congregation, including both cardinal electors and those too old to participate in the balloting, on 4 March. The last of the cardinal electors arrived on 7 March, Cardinal Jean-Baptiste Phạm Minh Mẫn of Vietnam. They took advantage of Benedict's modification of the rules and voted on 8 March to begin the conclave on 12 March.

== See also ==
- College of Cardinals
- Motu proprio
- 2013 papal conclave
- Supermajority
