= Zenit News Agency =

Catholic non-profit news agency

ZENIT is a non-profit news agency that reports on the Catholic Church and matters important to it from the perspective of Catholic doctrine. Its motto is "The world seen from Rome".

== Mission ==
The ZENIT Internet site describes the perspective of the agency as one which was "convinced of the extraordinary richness of the Catholic Church's message, particularly its social doctrine [...] [and which] sees this message as a light for understanding today's world." ZENIT's "compass is the social doctrine of the Church, summarized in the Compendium published by the Pontifical Council for Justice and Peace" of the Holy See.

The name "ZENIT" denotes "zenith" in many languages, being the highest point in the sky that the Sun reaches, which was a symbol associated with Jesus Christ by early Christians.

== Presence ==
ZENIT began publication in 1997, and published in seven languages at its peak. By its own account, ZENIT had 520,000 email subscribers and its articles have been reprinted in more than 100,000 media sources.

A number of Catholic authors have cited ZENIT reports in their printed works.

The agency suspended its "daily and weekly services in Spanish, English, and Italian" at the end of 2020, citing the COVID-19 pandemic. Most operations resumed by mid-2022.

== Publisher ==
According to the ZENIT site, Innovative Media Inc. published and edited the publications of the agency, and ZENIT worked directly or in collaboration with the following non-profits internationally: Fundación ZENIT España in Spain, Association ZENIT in France, ZENIT eV in Germany, and Associacao ZENIT in Brazil. Innovative Media Inc. is a non-profit corporation based in New York, United States, according to ZENIT, and was registered as a non-profit organization in Atlanta, Georgia. Its president is Antonio Maza.

ZENIT states that Aid to the Church in Need, the Italian Episcopal Conference, and the Legion of Christ largely funded it during its first three years. As of 2007, ZENIT stated that donations of its readers account for 75% of its funding and donations of institutions and benefactors for 13%. One 2006 report in Commonweal alleged that Innovative Media Inc. was a "front" for the Legion of Christ.

== See also ==
- America
- Catholic News Service
- Commonweal
- EWTN
- National Catholic Register
- National Catholic Reporter
- Faith & Family Magazine
- Delia Gallagher, former columnist and editor
