= Acclamation (papal elections) =

Former method of papal election in the Catholic Church

Acclamation was formerly one of the methods of papal election.

The method of electing the Roman Pontiff is contained in the constitutions of Gregory XV Æterni Patris Filius and Decet Romanum Pontificem, Urban VIII's constitution Ad Romani Pontificis Providentiam, and John Paul II's Universi Dominici gregis, issued in 1996. Prior to the issuance of Universi Dominici gregis, three methods of election were valid. These were by scrutiny (i.e. by secret ballot), by compromise (i.e. by reference to a committee of electors), and by acclamation (or "quasi-inspiration"). This last form of election consisted of all the electors present unanimously proclaiming one of the candidates Supreme Pontiff, without the formality of casting votes. As this was required to be done without previous consultation or negotiation, it was looked upon as proceeding from the Holy Spirit and hence was also designated "quasi-inspiration".

== List of papal elections by acclamation ==
Year of acclamation	Pope elected	Notes
236	Fabian	"...and so, divinely inspired, as it were, they chose Fabian with joyous unanimity and placed him in the Chair of Peter."
590	Gregory I	
731	Gregory III	"the Romans elected him pope by acclamation, when he was accompanying the funeral procession of his predecessor"
1073	Gregory VII	On the death of Alexander II (April 21, 1073), as the obsequies were being performed in the Lateran basilica, there arose a loud outcry from the whole multitude of clergy and people: "Let Hildebrand be pope!", "Blessed Peter has chosen Hildebrand the Archdeacon!" Later, on the same day, Hildebrand was conducted to the church of San Pietro in Vincoli, and there elected in legal form by the assembled cardinals, with the due consent of the Roman clergy and amid the repeated acclamations of the people.
1621	Gregory XV	
1670	Clement X	The election is said to have been determined by the sudden cry of the people outside the conclave, "Altieri Papa", which was confirmed by the cardinals.
1676	Innocent XI	The cardinals surrounded him in the chapel of the conclave and in spite of his resistance every one of them kissed his hand, proclaiming him Pope.

== Recent changes in papal election law ==
Universi Dominici gregis specifically disallowed both election by acclamation and by compromise; as a result the secret ballot is the sole valid method of electing a Pope. Originally, Universi Dominici gregis allowed for a Pope to be elected with a simple majority if the usual requirement of a two-thirds super majority could not be reached after thirty-four ballots. On June 11, 2007, Pope Benedict XVI issued a motu proprio which requires a two-thirds majority regardless of the number of ballots it takes to elect a new Pope.

== In fiction ==
- The 1904 novel Hadrian the Seventh by Frederick Rolfe features the apparently divinely-inspired election of George Arthur Rose, an Englishman only that day ordained, to the papacy.
- In the 1968 film The Shoes of the Fisherman, the Cardinal electors had acclaimed Cardinal Kiril Lakota as Pope after repeated balloting failed to produce the required majority.
- In the 1973 TV movie A Man Whose Name Was John, the Cardinal electors acclaimed Cardinal Angelo Roncalli (Raymond Burr) as Pope John XXIII. This part of an otherwise true story was fictionalized as he was not elected by acclamation.
- In the 1997 novel The Rise of Endymion by Dan Simmons, it is mentioned that Lenar Hoyt has been elected by acclamation nine times after his repeated deaths and resurrections. A tenth election, which occurs at the beginning of the book, is not unanimous due to plotting by his Secretary of State, but a ballot vote still goes in his favor.
- In the 2000 book Angels & Demons by Dan Brown, Camerlengo Carlo Ventresca faces election by acclamation.
