= Conclave =

Gathering convened to appoint the pope

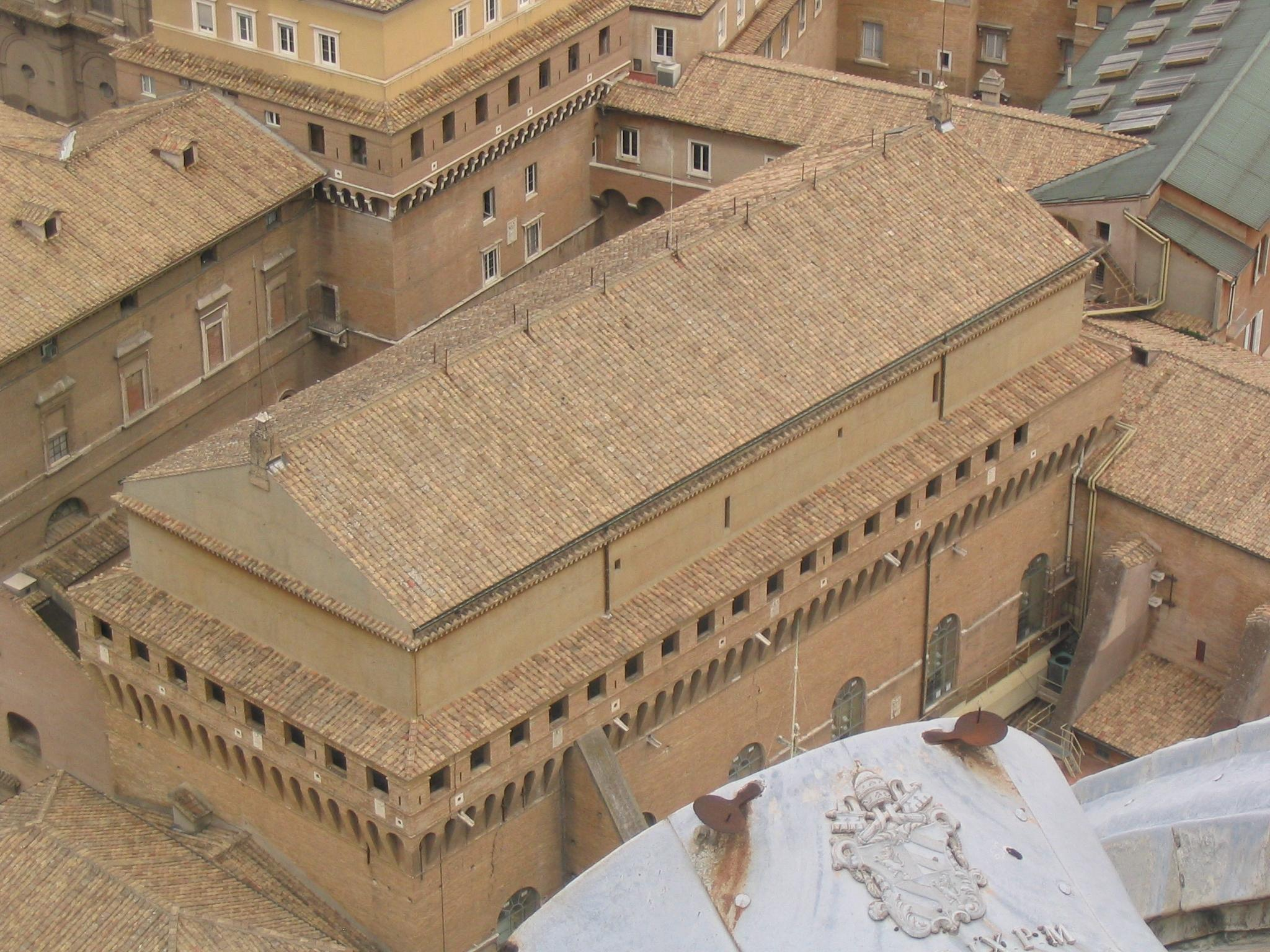
The 1492 papal conclave was the first to be held in the Sistine Chapel.

A conclave is a gathering of the College of Cardinals convened to appoint the pope of the Catholic Church. Catholics consider the pope to be the apostolic successor of Saint Peter and the earthly head of the Catholic Church.

From the Apostolic Age until 1059, the pope, like other bishops, was chosen by the consensus of the clergy (priests and deacons) and laity of the diocese. In 1059, the body of electors was more precisely defined, when the College of Cardinals was designated the sole body of electors.

Concerns around political interference led to reforms after the interregnum of 1268–1271 and Pope Gregory X's decree during the Second Council of Lyons in 1274 that the cardinal electors should be locked in seclusion cum clave (Latin for 'with a key') and not permitted to leave until a new pope had been elected. Conclaves are now held in the Sistine Chapel of the Apostolic Palace in Vatican City.

Since then, other details of the procedures have developed. In 1970, Pope Paul VI limited the electors to cardinals under 80 years of age in Ingravescentem aetatem. The current procedures established by Pope John Paul II in Universi Dominici gregis were slightly amended in 2007 and 2013 by Pope Benedict XVI.

A two-thirds supermajority vote is required to elect the new pope.

== Historical development ==
The procedures for the election of the pope developed over almost two millennia. Until the College of Cardinals was created in 1059, the bishops of Rome, like those in other areas, were elected by acclamation of the local clergy and people. Procedures similar to the present system were introduced in 1274 when Gregory X promulgated Ubi periculum following the action of the magistrates of Viterbo during the interregnum of 1268–1271.

The process was further refined by Gregory XV with his 1621 papal bull Aeterni Patris Filius, which established the requirement of a two-thirds majority of cardinal electors to elect a pope. The Third Council of the Lateran had initially set the requirement that two-thirds of the cardinals were needed to elect a pope in 1179. This requirement had varied since then, depending on whether the winning candidate was allowed to vote for himself, in which cases the required majority was two-thirds plus one vote. Aeterni Patris Filius prohibited this practice and established two-thirds as the standard needed for election.

Aeterni Patris Filius did not eliminate the possibility of election by acclamation, but did require that a secret ballot take place first before a pope could be elected. Prior to 1621, a cardinal could vote for himself, but it was always with the knowledge and consent of enough of the other voting cardinals, so that he did not make the final decision to make himself pope (accessus). Ballots were either signed or initialed in the corner of the ballot, or sometimes coded and numbered.

=== Electorate ===
As early Christian communities emerged, they elected bishops, chosen by the clergy and laity with the assistance of the bishops of neighbouring dioceses. Cyprian (died 258) says that Pope Cornelius (in office 251–253) was chosen as bishop of Rome "by the decree of God and of His Church, by the testimony of nearly all the clergy, by the college of aged bishops [sacerdotum], and of good men". As in other dioceses, the clergy of the Diocese of Rome was the electoral body for the bishop of Rome. Instead of casting votes, the bishop was selected by general consensus or by acclamation. The candidate was then submitted to the people for their general approval or disapproval. This lack of precision in the election procedures occasionally gave rise to rival popes or antipopes.

The right of the laity to reject the person elected was abolished by a synod held in the Lateran in 769, but restored to Roman noblemen by Pope Nicholas I during a synod of Rome in 862. The pope was also subjected to oaths of loyalty to the Holy Roman emperor, who had the duty of providing security and public peace in Rome. A major change came in 1059, when Pope Nicholas II decreed in In nomine Domini that the cardinals were to elect a candidate to take office after receiving the assent of the clergy and laity. The cardinal bishops were to meet first and discuss the candidates before summoning the cardinal priests and cardinal deacons for the actual vote. The Second Council of the Lateran in 1139 removed the requirement for obtaining the assent of the lower clergy and the laity, while the Third Council of the Lateran in 1179 gave equal rights to the entire College of Cardinals when electing a new pope.

Through much of the Middle Ages and Renaissance the Catholic Church had only a small number of cardinals at any one time, as few as seven under either Pope Alexander IV (1254–1261) or Pope John XXI (1276–1277). The difficulty of travel further reduced the number arriving at conclaves. The small electorate magnified the significance of each vote and made it all but impossible to displace familial or political allegiances. Conclaves lasted months and even years. In his 1274 decree requiring the electors be locked in seclusion, Gregory X also limited each cardinal elector to two servants and rationed their food progressively when a conclave reached its fourth and ninth days.

The cardinals disliked these rules; Pope Adrian V temporarily suspended them in 1276 and John XXI's Licet felicis recordationis revoked them later that same year. (Note: Each of these popes intended to promulgate a new constitution governing papal elections but died before doing so.) Lengthy elections resumed and continued to be the norm until 1294, when Pope Celestine V reinstated the 1274 rules. Long interregna followed: in 1314–1316 during the Avignon Papacy, where the original conclaves were dispersed by besieging mercenaries and not reconvened for almost two years; and in 1415–1417, as a result of the Western Schism.

Until 1899, it was a regular practice to generally include a few lay members in the Sacred College. These were often prominent nobility, or monks who were not priests, and in all cases, celibacy was required. With the death of Teodolfo Mertel in 1899, this practice was ended. In 1917, the Code of Canon Law promulgated that year, explicitly stated that all cardinals must be priests. Since 1962, all cardinals have been bishops, with the exception of a few priests who have been made cardinals since about 1970. These few have all been at least 80 years old and not allowed to vote in a papal election, since Paul VI in that same year of 1970 imposed the rule that all voting cardinals be under 80 years of age. If a priest is asked by the pope to become a cardinal he may request not to be ordained a bishop, but this is the exception rather than the rule.

In 1587, Pope Sixtus V limited the number of cardinals to 70, following the precedent of Moses who was assisted by 70 elders in governing the Children of Israel: 6 cardinal bishops, 50 cardinal priests, and 14 cardinal deacons. Beginning with the attempts of Pope John XXIII (1958–1963) to broaden the representation of nations in the College of Cardinals, that number has increased. In 1970 Paul VI ruled that cardinals who reach the age of 80 before the start of a conclave are ineligible to participate.

In 1975, he limited the number of cardinal electors to 120. Though this remains the theoretical limit, all of his successors have exceeded it for short periods of time. John Paul II (in office 1978–2005) made a slight change to the age limit rules, barring cardinals 80 or older from serving as electors if they reach that age before the papacy becomes vacant. This change eliminated the possibility of scheduling a conclave to include or exclude a cardinal who might be close to the limit. The 2025 papal conclave was the first time that more than 120 cardinal-electors participated, at 133.

=== Choice of electors and of candidates ===
Originally, lay status did not bar election to the See of Rome. Bishops of dioceses were sometimes elected while still catechumens, such as the case of St. Ambrose, who became bishop of Milan in 374. In the wake of the violent dispute over the 767 election of Antipope Constantine II, Pope Stephen III held the synod of 769, which decreed that only a cardinal priest or cardinal deacon could be elected, specifically excluding those that are already bishops. Church practice deviated from this rule as early as 817 and fully ignored it from 882 with the election of Pope Marinus I, the bishop of Caere.

Nicholas II, in the synod of 1059, formally codified existing practice by decreeing that preference was to be given to the clergy of Rome, but leaving the cardinal bishops free to select a cleric from elsewhere if they so decided. The Lateran Council of 1179 rescinded these restrictions on eligibility. On 15 February 1559, Paul IV issued the papal bull Cum ex apostolatus officio, a codification of the ancient Catholic law that only Catholics can be elected popes, to the exclusion of non-Catholics, including former Catholics who have become public and manifest heretics.

Pope Urban VI in 1378 became the last pope elected from outside the College of Cardinals. The last person elected as pope who was not already an ordained priest or deacon was the cardinal-deacon Giovanni di Lorenzo de' Medici, elected as Pope Leo X in 1513. His successor, Pope Adrian VI, was the last to be elected, in 1522, in absentia. Archbishop Giovanni Montini of Milan received several votes in the 1958 conclave though not yet a cardinal. As the Catholic Church holds that women cannot be validly ordained, women are not eligible for the papacy. (Note: Canon 1024 states: "A baptized male alone receives sacred ordination validly." Claims that there was a female pope, including the legendary Pope Joan, are fictitious.) Though the pope is the bishop of Rome, he need not be of Italian background. As of 2025, the four most recent conclaves have elected a Pole in 1978, a German in 2005, an Argentinian in 2013, and an American in 2025.

During the first millennium, popes were elected unanimously, at least in theory. After a decree by the Synod of Rome in 1059, some factions contended that a simple majority sufficed to elect. In 1179, the Third Council of the Lateran settled the question by calling for unanimity, but permitting the Pope to be elected by two-thirds majority, "if by chance, through some enemy sowing tares, there cannot be full agreement." As cardinals were not allowed to vote for themselves after 1621, the ballots were designed to ensure secrecy while at the same time preventing self-voting. (Note: The London Magazine printed an image of a ballot design in 1903 with this description: "It is divided into three compartments, in the first of which the Cardinal writes his own name, in the second that of the candidate for whom he votes, and in the third a motto and number. The first and third compartments are then folded twice and sealed down [with wax] at both sides, so that only the middle compartment can be seen by the scrutineers [vote counters].... Should the majority be exactly two-thirds of the total votes recorded, the papers are opened and the names of those voting in the majority examined, in order to make sure that the elected Cardinal did not vote for himself.")

In 1945, Pope Pius XII removed the requirement for signed ballots as well as the prohibition on a cardinal voting for himself, increasing the requisite majority to two-thirds plus one at all times. His successor John XXIII immediately reinstated the two-thirds majority if the number of cardinal electors voting is divisible by three, with an additional vote required if the number is not divisible by three. (Note: John XXIII (5 September 1962). Summi Pontificis Electio (in Latin). Motu proprio. AAS. 54. (1962) pp. 632–640. Vatican City.) Paul VI reinstated Pius XII's procedure thirteen years later, but John Paul II overturned it again.

In 1996, John Paul II's constitution allowed election by absolute majority if deadlock prevailed after thirty-three or thirty-four ballots, thirty-four ballots if a ballot took place on the first afternoon of the conclave. In 2007, Benedict XVI rescinded John Paul II's change, which had effectively abolished the two-thirds majority requirement after 33 or 34 rounds of balloting, whereas any majority will suffice to block the election until such time that a simple majority is enough to elect the next pope. Benedict's recission reinstated the traditional requirement of a two-thirds majority, regardless of the number of balloting rounds during the conclave.

Electors formerly made choices by accessus, acclamation (per inspirationem), adoration, compromise (per compromissum), or scrutiny (per scrutinium).

- Accessus was a method for cardinals to change their most recent vote to accede to another candidate in an attempt to reach the requisite two-thirds majority and end the conclave. This method was first disallowed by the cardinal dean at the 1903 conclave. Pius XII abolished accessus in 1945.
- With acclamation, the cardinals unanimously declared the new pope quasi afflati Spiritu Sancto (as if inspired by the Holy Spirit). If this took place before any formal ballot had taken place, the method was called adoration, but Pope Gregory XV excluded this method in 1621.
- To elect by compromise, a deadlocked college unanimously delegates the election to a committee of cardinals, whose choice they all agree to abide by.
- Scrutiny is election via the casting of secret ballots.

The last election by compromise was that of Pope John XXII in 1316, and the last election by acclamation was that of Pope Innocent XI in the 1676 conclave. Universi Dominici gregis formally abolished the long-unused methods of acclamation and compromise in 1996, making scrutiny the only approved method for the election of a new pope.

=== Secular influence ===
For a significant part of the Church's history, powerful monarchs and governments influenced the choice of its leaders. For example, the Roman emperors once held considerable sway in the elections of popes. In 418, Emperor Honorius settled a controversial election, upholding Pope Boniface I over the challenger Antipope Eulalius. On the request of Boniface I, Honorius ordered that in future cases, any disputed election would be settled by a fresh election.

After the demise of the Western Roman Empire, influence passed to the Ostrogothic kings of Italy. In 533, Pope John II formally recognised the right of the Ostrogothic monarchs to ratify elections. By 537, the Ostrogothic monarchy had been overthrown, and power passed to the Byzantine emperors. A procedure was adopted whereby officials were required to notify the exarch of Ravenna upon the death of a pope before proceeding with the election. Once the electors arrived at a choice, they were required to send a delegation to Constantinople requesting the emperor's consent, which was necessary before the individual elected could take office.

Travel to and from Constantinople caused lengthy delays. When Pope Benedict II (684–685) complained about them, Emperor Constantine IV (in office 654–685) acquiesced, ending the requirement for emperors to confirm elections. Thereafter, the emperor was only required to be notified. The last pope to notify a Byzantine emperor was Zachary in 741.

In the 9th century, the Carolingian Empire (and its successor, the Holy Roman Empire) came to exert control over papal elections. Charlemagne, emperor from 800 to 814, and Louis the Pious, emperor from 813 to 840 did not interfere with the Church. Lothair I, emperor from 817 to 855, claimed that an election could only take place in the presence of imperial ambassadors. In 898, riots forced Pope John IX to recognise the superintendence of the Holy Roman emperor. At the same time, the Roman nobility continued to exert great influence, especially during the tenth-century period known as saeculum obscurum, Latin for "the dark age".

In 1059, the same papal bull that restricted suffrage to the cardinals recognised the authority of the Holy Roman emperor, at the time Henry IV, but only as a concession made by the pope, declaring that the emperor had no authority to intervene in elections, except where permitted to do so by papal agreements. Pope Gregory VII, in office 1073–1085, was the last pope to submit to the interference of the Holy Roman emperors. The breach between him and the Holy Roman Empire caused by the Investiture Controversy led to the abolition of the emperor's role. In 1122, the Holy Roman Empire acceded to the Concordat of Worms, accepting the papal decision.

From about 1600, certain Catholic monarchs claimed a jus exclusivae (right of exclusion), i.e. a veto over papal elections, exercised through a crown-cardinal. By an informal convention, each state claiming the veto could exercise the right, once per conclave. Therefore, a crown-cardinal did not announce his veto until the very last moment, when the candidate in question seemed likely to get elected. No vetoes could be employed after an election. After the Holy Roman Empire dissolved in 1806, its veto power devolved upon the Austrian Empire. The last exercise of the veto occurred in 1903, when Prince Jan Puzyna de Kosielsko informed the College of Cardinals that Austria opposed the election of Mariano Rampolla. Consequently, the college elected Giuseppe Sarto as Pope Pius X, who issued the constitution Commissum nobis six months later, declaring that any cardinal who communicated his government's veto in the future would suffer excommunication latae sententiae.

=== Seclusion and resolution ===
To resolve prolonged deadlocks in papal elections in the earlier years, local authorities often resorted to the forced seclusion of the cardinal electors, such as first in the city of Rome in 1241, and possibly before that in Perugia in 1216. In 1268, when the forced seclusion of the cardinals failed to produce a pope, the city of Viterbo refused to send in any materials except bread and water. When even this failed to produce a result, the townspeople removed the roof of the Palazzo dei Papi in their attempt to speed up the election. It lasted for two years and eight months and was the longest conclave in history.

In 1274, in an attempt to avoid future lengthy elections, Gregory X introduced stringent rules, with the promulgation of Ubi periculum. Cardinals were to be secluded in a closed area and not accorded individual rooms. No cardinal was allowed, unless ill, to be attended by more than two servants. Food was supplied through a window to avoid outside contact. (Note: Formerly, cardinals regularly had meals sent in from their homes with much pageantry accompanying the conveyance of food: "Towards noon each day, the Cardinal's gentlemen proceeded to his house and conveyed his dinner to the Vatican in a state coach. They were accompanied by an officer, known as the Seneschal Dapifer, who was charged with the very important duty of seeing that the Cardinal's food was not poisoned! ... The dishes were enclosed in hampers or tin boxes, covered with green or violet drapery, and ... were carried in state through the entrance halls, preceded by the mace of the cardinal. The Seneschal Dapifer, bearing a serviette on his shoulder, preceded the dishes.... Before the Cardinal received his dinner, each dish underwent a careful inspection by the prelates on guard, in order that no letter should be concealed in it." These ceremonies have not been observed since the nineteenth century.) After three days of the conclave, the cardinals were to receive only one dish a day. After another five days, they were to receive just bread and water. During the conclave, no cardinal was to receive any ecclesiastical revenue. As of 2025, cooks and servers are also sworn to secrecy, and may not serve food such as ravioli and whole chicken, which may conceal messages. During the 2025 conclave, meals were prepared by the nuns at the Domus Sanctae Marthae; though cardinals were allowed to bring in their own snacks.

In 1276, Adrian V abolished Gregory X's strict regulations. Celestine V, elected in 1294 following a two-year vacancy, restored them. In 1562, Pius IV issued a papal bull that introduced regulations relating to the enclosure of the conclave and other procedures. Gregory XV issued two bulls that covered the most minute of details relating to the election. The first, in 1621, concerned electoral processes. The other, in 1622, fixed the ceremonies to be observed. In December 1904, Pope Pius X issued an apostolic constitution consolidating almost all the previous rules, albeit with some changes, the Vacante sede apostolica. John Paul II instituted several reforms in 1996.

The location of the conclaves became fixed in the fourteenth century. Since the end of the Western Schism in 1417, they have taken place in Rome, except in 1799–1800, when French troops occupying Rome forced the election to be held in Venice, and normally in what, since the Lateran Treaties of 1929, has become the independent Vatican City State. Since 1846, when the Quirinal Palace was used, the Sistine Chapel in the Vatican has served as the location of the election. Popes have often fine-tuned the rules for the election of their successors: Pope Pius XII's Vacantis Apostolicae Sedis (1945) governed the conclave of 1958, Pope John XXIII's Summi Pontificis electio (1962) that of 1963, Pope Paul VI's Romano Pontifici eligendo (1975) the two conclaves of 1978, Pope John Paul II's Universi Dominici gregis (1996) that of 2005, and two amendments by Pope Benedict XVI (2007 and 2013) that of 2013 and 2025.

== Modern practice ==
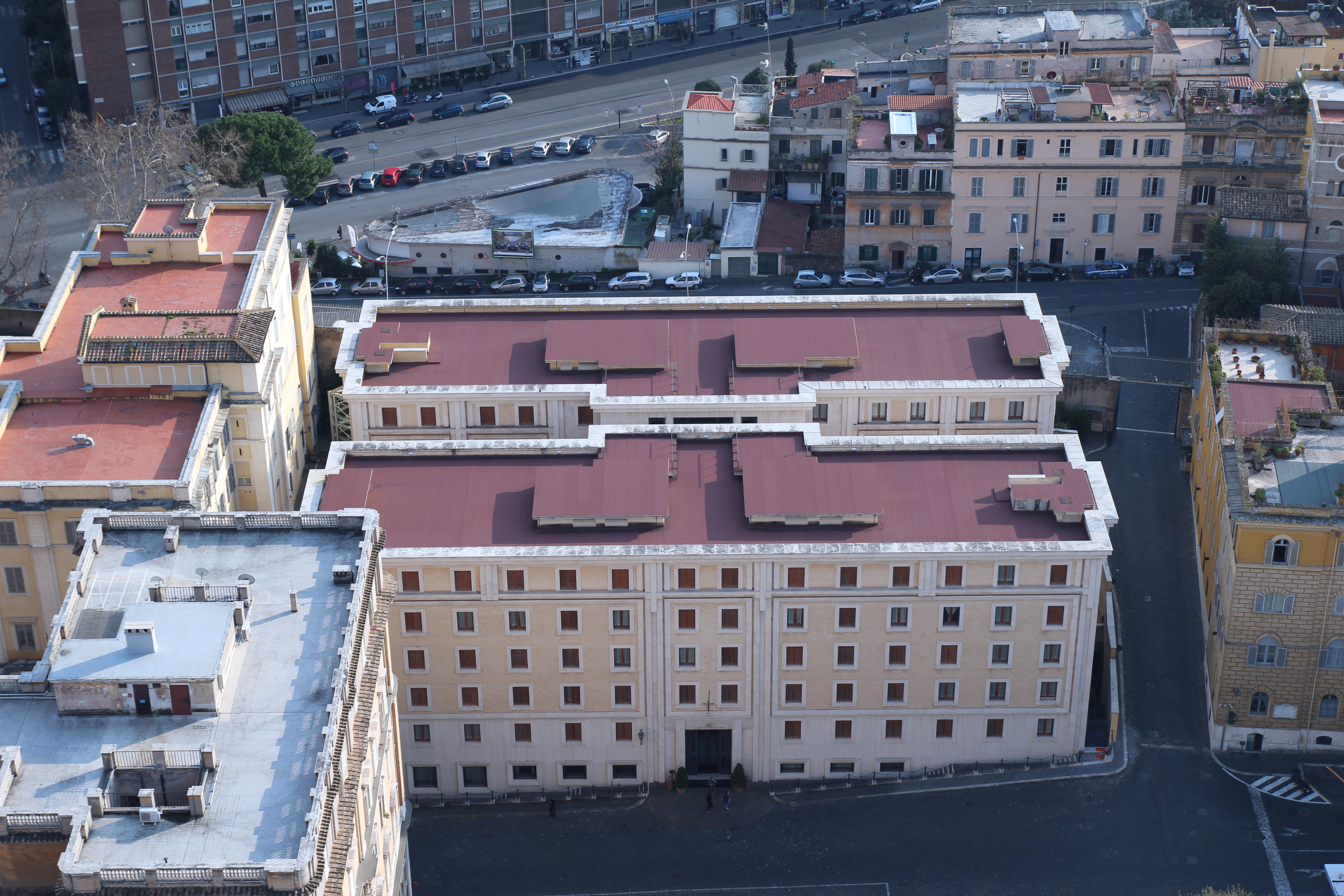
Since the 2005 papal conclave, the cardinal electors reside in the Domus Sanctae Marthae for the length of the conclave.

In 1996, John Paul II promulgated a new apostolic constitution, Universi Dominici gregis, which with slight modifications by Pope Benedict XVI now governs the election of the pope, abolishing all previous constitutions on the matter, but preserving many procedures that date to much earlier times. Under Universi Dominici gregis, the cardinals are to be lodged in a purpose-built edifice in Vatican City, the Domus Sanctae Marthae, but continue to vote in the Sistine Chapel.

Several duties are performed by the dean of the College of Cardinals, who is always a cardinal bishop. If the dean is not entitled to participate in the conclave owing to age, his place is taken by the vice-dean, who is also always a cardinal bishop. If the vice-dean cannot participate, the senior cardinal bishop participating performs the functions.

Since the College of Cardinals is a small body, there have been proposals that the electorate should be expanded. Proposed reforms include a plan to replace the College of Cardinals as the electoral body with the Synod of Bishops, which includes many more members. Under present procedure, the synod may only meet when called by the pope. Universi Dominici gregis explicitly provides that even if a synod or an ecumenical council is in session at the time of a pope's death, it may not conduct the election. Upon the pope's death, both bodies' proceedings are suspended, to be resumed only upon the order of the new pope.

=== Death of a pope ===
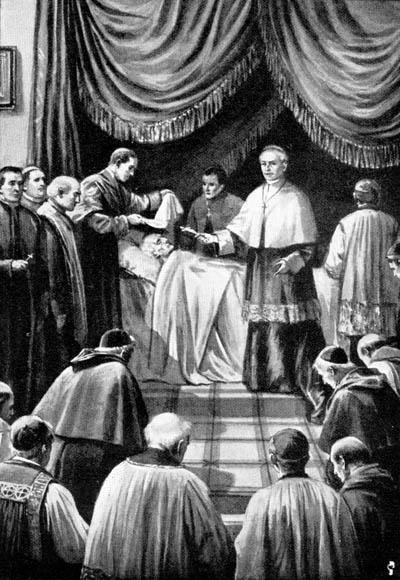
The camerlengo proclaiming a papal death

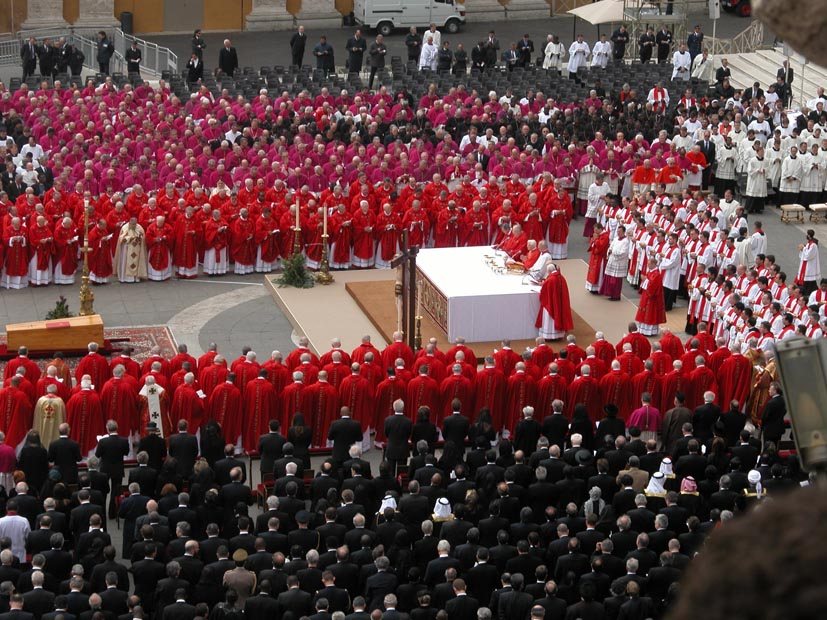
Cardinals, bishops and priests attending the funeral of Pope John Paul II

The death of the pope is verified by the cardinal camerlengo, or chamberlain, who traditionally performed the task by calling out his baptismal (not papal) name. After confirming the death of the pope, the camerlengo pronounces the phrase "sede vacante" ("The throne is empty"). The camerlengo takes possession of the Ring of the Fisherman worn by the pope. The ring, along with the papal seal, is later destroyed before the College of Cardinals. The tradition originated to avoid forgery of documents, but today merely is a symbol of the end of the pope's reign.

During the sede vacante, as the papal vacancy is known, certain limited powers pass to the College of Cardinals, which is convoked by the dean of the College of Cardinals. All cardinals are obliged to attend the general congregation of cardinals, except those whose health does not permit, or who are over eighty. Those older cardinals may choose to attend if they please as non-voting members.

The particular congregation that deals with the day-to-day matters of the Church includes the cardinal camerlengo and the three cardinal assistants—one cardinal bishop, one cardinal priest and one cardinal deacon—chosen by lot. Every three days, new cardinal assistants are chosen by lot. The camerlengo and assistants are responsible, among other things, for maintaining the election's secrecy.

The congregations must make certain arrangements in respect of the pope's burial, which by tradition takes place within four to six days of the pope's death, leaving time for pilgrims to see the dead pontiff, and occurs within a nine-day period of mourning known as the novemdiales (Latin for 'nine days'). The congregations also fix the date and time of the commencement of the conclave. The conclave normally takes place fifteen days after the death of the pope, but the congregations may extend the period to a maximum of twenty days in order to permit other cardinals to arrive in Vatican City.

=== Resignation of a pope ===
A vacancy in the papal office may also result from a papal resignation. Until the resignation of Benedict XVI on 28 February 2013, no pope had resigned since Gregory XII in 1415. In 1996, Pope John Paul II, in his apostolic constitution Universi Dominici gregis, anticipated the possibility of resignation when he specified that the procedures he set out in that document should be observed "even if the vacancy of the Apostolic See should occur as a result of the resignation of the Supreme Pontiff".

In the case of a papal resignation, the Ring of the Fisherman is placed in the custody of the cardinal camerlengo; in the presence of the College of Cardinals, the camerlengo marks an "X" (for the cross) with a small silver hammer and chisel into the ring, disfiguring it so it may no longer be used for signing and sealing official papal documents.

In his book Light of the World: The Pope, the Church and the Signs of the Times, Pope Benedict XVI espoused the idea of resignation on health grounds, which already had some theological respectability.

=== Before the sealing of the Sistine Chapel ===
The cardinals hear two sermons before the election: one before actually entering the conclave, and one once they are settled in the Sistine Chapel. In both cases, the sermons are meant to lay out the current state of the Church, and to suggest the qualities necessary for a pope to possess in that specific time. Among the conclave preachers include Cardinal Raniero Cantalamessa (who preached in 2005, 2013, and 2025), Cardinal Tomáš Špidlík (in 2005), Cardinal Prosper Grech (in 2013), and Benedictine Abbot Donato Ogliari (in 2025).

On the morning of the day designated by the congregations of cardinals, all members of the College of Cardinals, both electors and non-electors, assemble in Saint Peter's Basilica to celebrate Mass, to be presided by the Dean of the College of Cardinals, regardless whether he is an elector or not. Then the cardinal-electors gather in the afternoon in the Pauline Chapel in the Apostolic Palace and process to the Sistine Chapel while singing the Litany of the Saints. When the electors have entered the chapel and the Litany is concluded, they sing the "Veni Creator Spiritus", invoking the Holy Spirit, then take an oath to observe the procedures set down by the apostolic constitutions; to, if elected, defend the liberty of the Holy See; to maintain secrecy; and to disregard the instructions of secular authorities on voting. The senior cardinal reads the oath aloud in full. In order of precedence the other cardinal electors repeat the oath, while touching the Gospels. Where their rank is the same, their seniority is taken as precedence. The oath is:

Et ego [prænomen] Cardinalis [nomen] spondeo, voveo ac iuro. Sic me Deus adiuvet et haec Sancta Dei Evangelia, quae manu mea tango.

Translation:

And I, [forename] Cardinal [surname], do so promise, pledge, and swear. So help me God and these Holy Gospels, which I touch with my hand.

=== Expelling the outsiders ===
After all the cardinals present have taken the oath, the master of papal liturgical celebrations orders all individuals other than the cardinal electors and conclave participants to leave the chapel. Traditionally, he stands at the door of the Sistine Chapel and calls out: "Extra omnes!" (Latin for 'Outside, all [of you]'). He then closes the door. In modern practice, the master need not stand at the door to perform this duty. During the 2005 conclave, 2013 conclave and 2025 conclave, the masters Piero Marini, Guido Marini and Diego Ravelli respectively, gave the command through a microphone while standing in front of the altar, then went to close the chapel doors after the outsiders had left.

The master himself may remain, as may one ecclesiastic designated by the congregations prior to the commencement of the election. The ecclesiastic makes a speech concerning the problems facing the Church and on the qualities the new pope needs to have. After the speech concludes, the ecclesiastic leaves. Following the recitation of prayers, the senior cardinal asks if any doubts relating to procedure remain. After the clarification of the doubts, if any, the election proper may commence. Cardinals who arrive after the conclave has begun are admitted nevertheless. A cardinal who becomes ill or needs to use the restroom may leave the conclave and later be readmitted, but a cardinal who leaves for any other reason may not return.

Although in the past cardinal electors could be accompanied by attendants ("conclavists"), now the only permitted attendant is a nurse if the Congregation of Cardinals confirms that a cardinal in ill-health requires one. A nurse is permitted during the period of election if necessary. The secretary of the College of Cardinals, the master of papal liturgical celebrations, two masters of ceremonies, two officers of the Papal Sacristy and an ecclesiastic assisting the dean of the College of Cardinals are admitted to the conclave. Priests are available to hear confessions in different languages. Two doctors are also admitted. A strictly limited number of servant staff are permitted for housekeeping and the preparing and serving of meals. All require prior approval from the Cardinal Camerlengo and the three Cardinal Assistants.

Secrecy is maintained during the conclave. The cardinals and staff are forbidden to disclose any information relating to the election. They may not correspond or converse with anyone outside the conclave by any means. Violating this oath, or an outsider eavesdropping, is punished by excommunication latae sententiae. Only three cardinal electors are permitted to communicate with the outside world under grave circumstances, with the prior approval of the college, to fulfill their duties: the Major Penitentiary, the cardinal vicar for the Diocese of Rome, and the vicar general for the Vatican City State.

Before the conclave that elected Pope Francis, the Sistine Chapel was "swept" to detect any hidden "bugs" or surveillance devices. There were no reports that any were found, but in previous conclaves press reporters who had disguised themselves as conclave servants were discovered. Universi Dominici gregis specifically prohibits media such as newspapers, the radio, and television. Wi-Fi access is blocked in Vatican City. Wireless signal jammers are deployed at the Sistine Chapel to prevent any form of electronic communications to or from the cardinal electors. In addition, cardinal-electors are required to surrender their electronic devices upon taking residence at Domus Sanctae Marthae for the conclave.

=== Voting ===
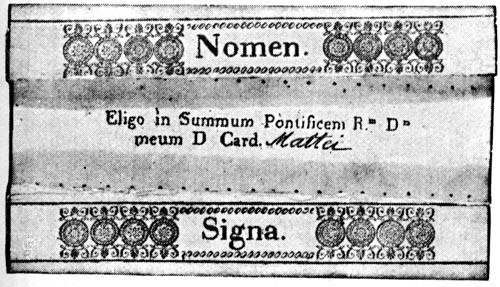
Cardinals formerly used these intricate ballot papers, one of which is shown folded above. The text Latin reads "Name" and "Signature" at bottom, with the middle text translating to, "I choose as Supreme Pontiff my most reverend lord, the Lord Cardinal [name]." Currently, the ballots are simple cards, folded once, like a note card, with the words "I elect as Supreme Pontiff" printed in Latin on them.

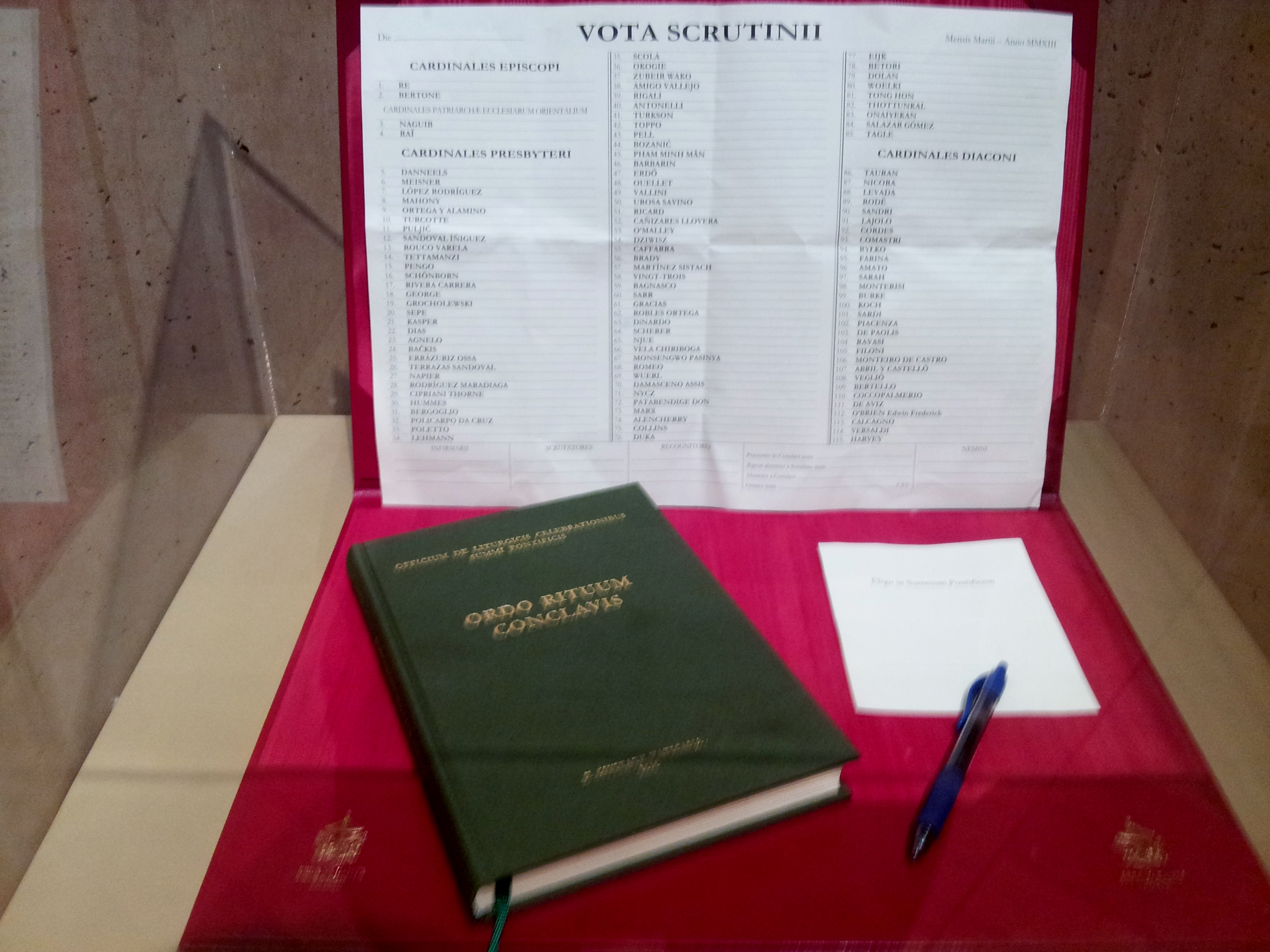
Today, cardinal electors receive copies of multiple ballot cards, scrutiny ballots, and a copy of Ordo Rituum Conclavis (Order of Conclave Rites). Shown above are the ballot papers of Cardinal Roger Mahony used in the 2013 conclave.

On the afternoon of the first day, one ballot (referred to as a "scrutiny") may be held, but is not required. A maximum of four ballots are held on each successive day: two in each morning and two in each afternoon. Before voting in the morning and again before voting in the afternoon, the electors take an oath to obey the rules of the conclave.

If no result is obtained after three vote days of balloting, the process is suspended for a maximum of one day for prayer and an address by the senior cardinal deacon. After seven further ballots, the process may again be similarly suspended, with the address now being delivered by the senior cardinal priest. If, after another seven ballots, no result is achieved, voting is suspended once more, the address being delivered by the senior cardinal bishop.

After a further seven ballots, there shall be a day of prayer, reflection and dialogue. In the following ballots, only the two names who received the most votes in the last ballot shall be eligible in a runoff election where a two-thirds majority is still required. The two people voted on, even if cardinal electors, shall not themselves have the right to vote.

The process of voting consist of three phases: the "pre-scrutiny", the "scrutiny", and the "post-scrutiny".

==== Pre-scrutiny ====
During the pre-scrutiny, the masters of ceremonies prepare ballot papers bearing the words Eligo in Summum Pontificem ('I elect as Supreme Pontiff') and provide at least two to each cardinal elector. As the cardinals begin to write their votes, the secretary of the College of Cardinals, the master of papal liturgical celebrations and the masters of ceremonies exit. The junior cardinal deacon then closes the door.

During the first pre-scrutiny of any given morning, the junior cardinal deacon randomly draws nine names. The first three cardinals so chosen become scrutineers, the second three infirmarii and the last three revisers. These cardinals retain their roles for the second scrutiny of the morning, if it is needed.

If both morning scrutinies fail to produce a result, the cardinals re-take the oath to obey the rules of the conclave once they have eaten lunch and again gathered in the Sistine Chapel. A drawing is held to choose new scrutineers, infirmarii, and revisers, and the third scrutiny of the day is then held, immediately followed by a fourth if necessary.

No changes in these rules were made by Benedict XVI in 2007. These were the rules followed so far as is known, given the secrecy of the conclave in electing Leo XIV in May 2025.

==== Scrutiny ====
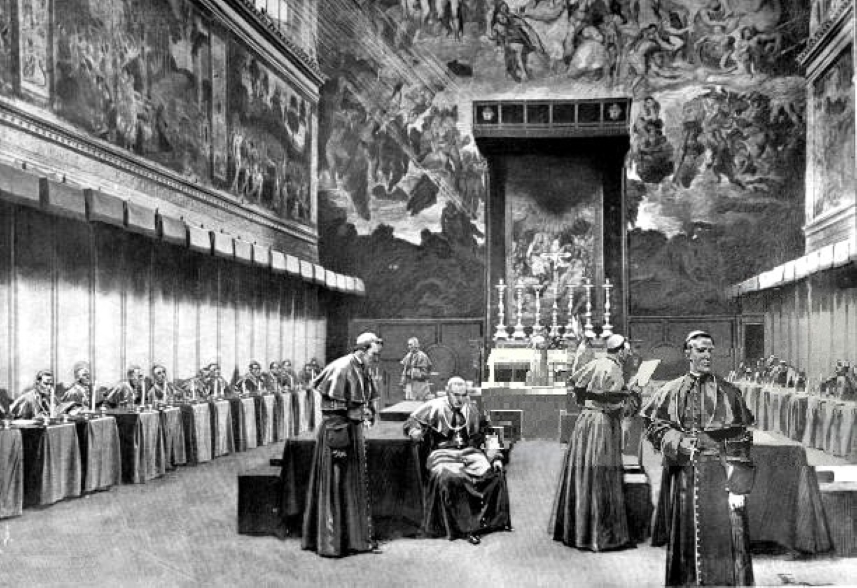
Scrutiny during the conclave of 1903

In order of precedence, the cardinals approach the scrutineers at the altar and deposit their ballots into a receptacle there. Each ballot bears only the name of the candidate selected by its holder, who recites the following Latin oath before casting it:

Testor Christum Dominum, qui me iudicaturus est, me eum eligere, quem secundum Deum iudico eligi debere.

Translation:

I call as my witness Christ the Lord, who is to judge me, that I choose him whom according to God I judge ought to be elected.

If any cardinal elector is in the chapel, but cannot proceed to the altar due to infirmity, the last scrutineer may go to him and take his ballot after he has recited the oath. If any cardinal electors are confined to their rooms for this reason, the infirmarii go to their rooms with ballot papers and a box. These cardinals fill out their ballots, recite the oath, and place them in the box. When the infirmarii return to the chapel, the ballots are counted to ensure that their number matches with the number of ill cardinals, whereupon they are transferred to the receptacle holding the ballots cast by those in the chapel.

If no candidate receives a two-thirds vote on the first scrutiny, then a second scrutiny immediately follows. A maximum of four scrutinies can be carried out per day, two apiece in the morning and afternoon.

Under present rules, the oath that cardinals take when casting their votes is only verbal, since they no longer sign their names on the ballots. Previous rules required each cardinal to sign his ballot and mark it with a unique identification code, or motif. He then folded the ballot in two places to cover his signature and motif, leaving only the name of his chosen candidate exposed, and sealed it with wax to create a semi-secret ballot.

The wax seals were opened only if a candidate received the bare minimum needed for election. This was to ensure that the apparently elected man had not voted for himself. This was the procedure from 1621 to 1945. The example above is a copy of the three section semi-secret ballot, which was last used in the conclave of 1939. There was no oath taken when actually casting ballots, prior to 1621.

Semi-secret ballots with initials or motif written on the back of the ballot, or voting verbally, at the option of the cardinals present and voting, were sometimes used prior to 1621. These secret ballots had no oath taken when the vote was actually cast. At some conclaves prior to 1621, the cardinals verbally voted and sometimes stood in groups to facilitate counting the votes cast. The signature and motif of the elector covered by two folded-over parts of the ballot paper was added by Gregory XV in 1621, to prevent anyone from casting the deciding vote for himself, and also to insure semi-secrecy.

In 1549, Cardinal Pole of England refused to cast the deciding vote for himself, which would then have been followed by the accession to raise his vote total to at least one more than the minimum number needed, and was not elected. In 1492, Cardinal Borgia (Pope Alexander VI) almost certainly privately bribed other cardinals to vote for him. It is certain that he would not have been allowed to cast the deciding vote for himself, without the knowledge and consent of the other cardinals. A procedure called accession gave electors who had not voted for the possible new pope the opportunity to change their votes and make the election unanimous, or nearly so, (except for the vote of the possible new pope). This is how Cardinal Borgia was elected pope in 1492. To make accession work, each elector had to sign or code his ballot to later identify it, if he desired to change his vote to a different candidate.

Faced by the mortal challenge to the papacy emanating from Protestantism, and fearing schism due to several stormy conclaves in the late 16th and early 17th centuries, Gregory XV established the procedure of signed ballots with covering fold over flaps sealed with wax to prevent any cardinal from casting the deciding vote for himself. The accession was not ended, but was seldom used until Pius XII abolished it in 1945. Since 1945, a cardinal can cast the deciding vote for himself without the accession, though the two-thirds majority rule has always been continued, except when John Paul II had modified that rule in 1996, after 33 ballots, a simple majority being sufficient. The two-thirds majority rule was restored in 2007 by Benedict XVI.

Prior to 1621, the only oath taken was that of obedience to the rules of the conclave in force at that time, when the cardinals entered the conclave and the doors were locked, and each morning and afternoon as they entered the Sistine Chapel to vote. Gregory XV added the additional oath, taken when each cardinal casts his ballot, to prevent cardinals wasting time in casting "courtesy votes" and instead narrowing the number of realistic candidates for the papal throne to perhaps only two or three. Speed in electing a pope was important, and that meant using an oath so as to get the cardinals down to the serious business of electing a new pope and narrowing the number of potentially electable candidates.

The reforms of Gregory XV in 1621 and reaffirmed in 1622 created the written detailed step-by-step procedure used in choosing a pope; a procedure that was essentially the same as the process used in 2025 to elect Pope Leo XIV. The biggest change since 1621 was the elimination of the rule that required the electors to sign their ballots, resulting in the detailed voting procedure of scrutiny making use of simple verbal oaths. Beginning in 1945, an elector could vote for himself and then call on God via the oath taken when the vote is dropped into the receptacle, to declare himself to be the best one qualified for the papacy. The use of the accession would prevent this, but is not allowed under the present rules. Beginning with the use of totally secret ballots in the 1958 conclave, it is now possible for a cardinal to cast the deciding vote for himself, without the knowledge and consent of the other cardinals.

Once all votes have been cast, the first scrutineer chosen shakes the container, and the last scrutineer removes and counts the ballots. If the number of ballots does not correspond to the number of cardinal electors present, including sick cardinals in their rooms, the ballots are burnt, unread, and the vote is repeated. If no irregularities are observed, the ballots may be opened and the votes counted. Each ballot is unfolded by the first scrutineer. All three scrutineers separately write down the name indicated on the ballot. The last of the scrutineers reads the name aloud.

Once all of the ballots have been opened, the final post-scrutiny phase begins.

==== Post-scrutiny ====
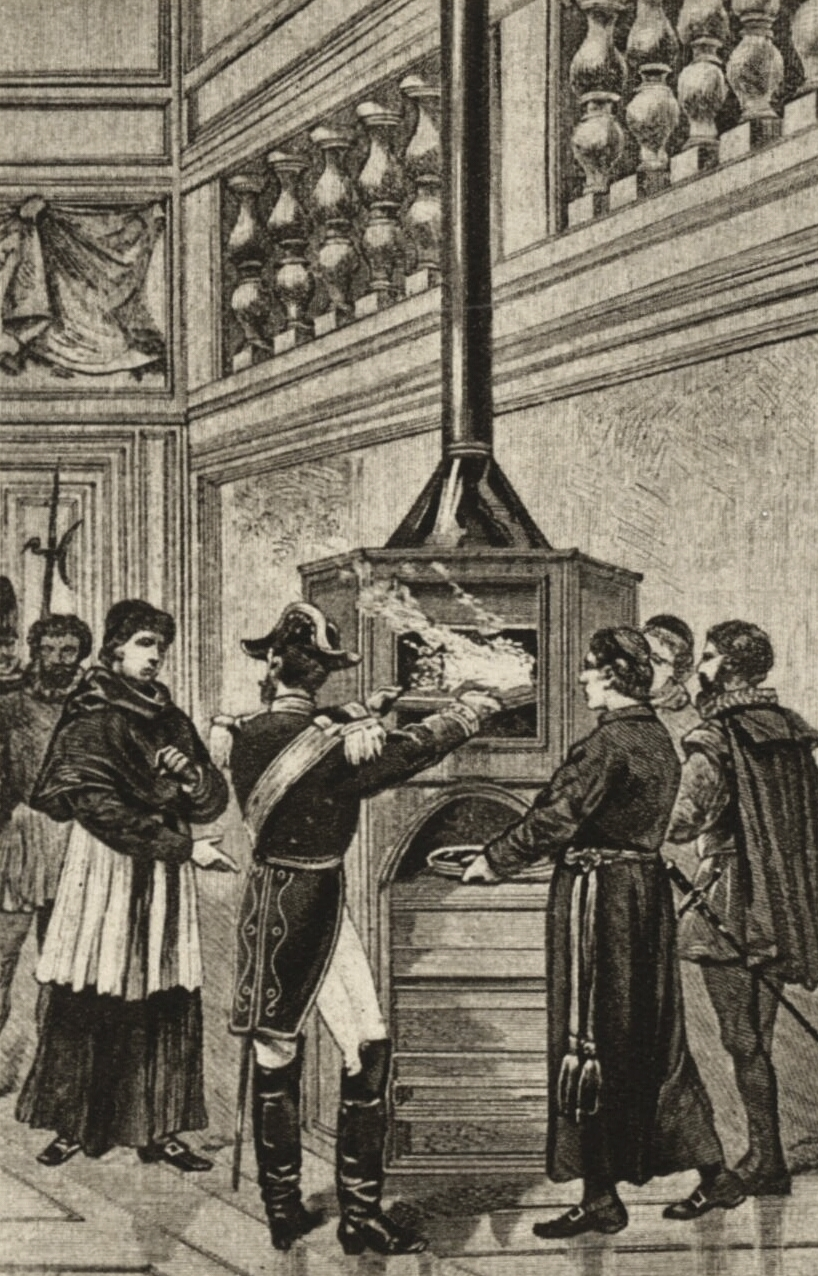
Illustration of the burning of ballots (1939)

The scrutineers add up all of the votes, and the revisers check the ballots and the names on the scrutineers' lists to ensure that no error has been made. The ballots are then stitched together with a needle and red thread and burned by the scrutineers with the assistance of the secretary of the College of Cardinals and the masters of ceremonies. If the first scrutiny held in any given morning or afternoon does not result in an election, the cardinals proceed to the next scrutiny immediately. The papers from both scrutinies are then burned together at the end of the second scrutiny.

=== Fumata ===
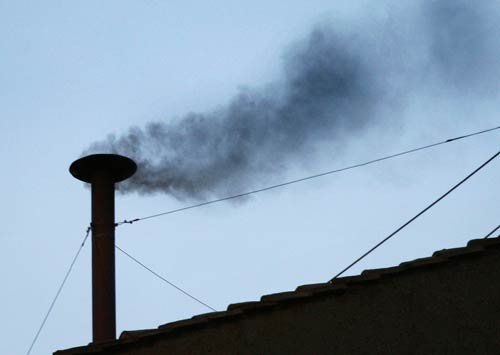
Black smoke in the Sistine Chapel, indicating there has been no two-thirds majority necessary for a papal election

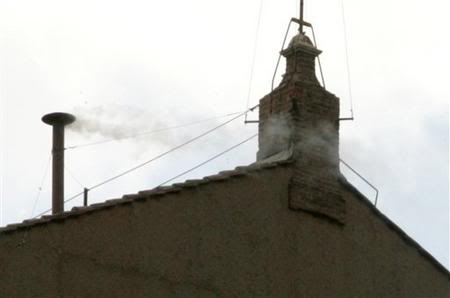
White smoke in the Sistine Chapel, indicating that a pope has been elected by the College of Cardinals.

Beginning in the early 1800s, the ballots used by cardinals were burned after each ballot to indicate a failed election. The lack of smoke instead signalled a successful election. Since 1914, black smoke (fumata nera) emerging from a temporary chimney installed on the roof of the Sistine Chapel indicates that the ballot did not result in an election. White smoke (fumata bianca) announces that a new pope has been chosen. Smoke is not necessarily issued after every unsuccessful election; when there has been two votes, the ballots from the two votes are burned together.

Until 1945, when Pius XII changed the form of ballot to use the unsigned ballots first used in 1958, the sealing wax on the complex type ballots illustrated above had the effect of making the smoke from burning the ballots either black or white, depending on whether or not damp straw was added. Until the 20th century, sealing wax customarily had beeswax mixed into its composition. Burning wax made solely from animal fat does not give as much white smoke as does wax that includes beeswax.

In the 1939 conclave, there was some confusion over the smoke color, which was even more apparent in the 1958 conclave. The lack of sealing wax on the ballots likely explains the confusion over the color of the smoke in the 1958 conclave. The Siri thesis was based on the confusion over the smoke color on the first day of that conclave.

Since 1963 chemicals have been added to the burning process to augment the smoke's black or white color. Since 2005, a successful election has been announced by the bells of Saint Peter's Basilica ringing at the appearance of the white smoke.

During the 2013 conclave, the Vatican disclosed the chemicals used. The black smoke is made by adding potassium perchlorate, anthracene, and sulfur. The white smoke is made by adding potassium chlorate, lactose, and pine rosin. Sugar is burned to produce large amounts of gaseous output, primarily water vapor (steam) and carbon dioxide. Pine rosin produces a "thick white smoke" when heated and contains terpenes, which burn to yield a pale, visible smoke.

==== Security ====
Security technologist Bruce Schneier wrote in 2013 about safeguards used by the conclave to forestall possible voter fraud. He says that since the elections are manually conducted and have a small group of electors who know each other, the process is immune to many technological attacks. And since the process has developed over millenia, it has ended up "surprisingly good".

=== Acceptance and proclamation ===
Once the election concludes, the cardinal dean summons the secretary of the College of Cardinals and the master of papal liturgical celebrations into the hall. The dean then asks the pope-elect if he assents to the election, saying in Latin: Acceptasne electionem de te canonice factam in Summum Pontificem? ("Do you accept your canonical election as Supreme Pontiff?") There is no requirement that the pope-elect do so, and he is free to respond Non accepto ("I do not accept").

In practice, any cardinal who intends not to accept will explicitly state this before he receives a sufficient number of votes to become pope, as Giovanni Colombo did in October 1978.

==== Consecration ====
If he accepts, and is already a bishop, he immediately takes office. If he is not a bishop, he must be first consecrated as one before he can assume office. If a priest is elected, the dean of the College of Cardinals consecrates him bishop. If a layman is elected, then the dean first ordains him deacon, then priest, and then consecrates him as bishop. After becoming a bishop the pope-elect takes office. These functions of the dean are assumed, if necessary, by the sub-dean. If the sub-dean is also impeded, they are assumed by the senior cardinal bishop in attendance.

Since the imposition of the age-restrictions on Cardinals aged 80 and older by Pope Paul VI in 1970, the Dean of the College of Cardinals has participated in a conclave only once, and has never confirmed the election of an elected Pope. Jean Marie Villot presided the August 1978 and October 1978 papal conclaves on behalf of then-Dean Carlo Confalonieri, and confirmed the elections of Albino Luciani and Karol Wojtyla, respectively. In 2005, because Joseph Ratzinger, the dean, was elected Pope, the duties of confirming the election fell into the hands of the vice-dean, Angelo Sodano. In 2013, Giovanni Battista Re was the senior cardinal bishop (who later became dean himself in 2020) who confirmed the election of Jorge Mario Bergoglio. In 2025, the presiding cardinal over the conclave was Pietro Parolin, who confirmed the election of Robert Francis Prevost.

==== Papal name ====
Since 533, the new pope has also decided on his regnal name. Pope John II was the first to adopt a new papal name. He felt that his original name, Mercurius, was inappropriate, as it was also the name of a Roman god. In most cases, even if such considerations are absent, popes tend to choose papal names different from their baptismal names. The last pope to reign under his baptismal name was Pope Marcellus II (1555). After the newly elected pope accepts his election, the dean asks him about his papal name, saying in Latin: Quo nomine vis vocari? ("By what name do you wish to be called?"). After the pope-elect has taken time to think about the papal name he chooses (sometimes with some help from other cardinals), the officials are readmitted to the conclave, and the master of papal liturgical celebrations writes a document recording the acceptance and the new name of the pope.

==== Canopies ====
In the past, when the cardinals voted during a conclave, they sat on canopied thrones symbolizing the cardinals' collective governance of the church during the period of sede vacante. Upon the acceptance by the new pope of his election, all other cardinals in attendance each pulled a cord and lowered the canopies above their respective thrones, signifying an end to the period of collective governance, with only the newly elected pope's canopy remained unlowered. The last time canopied thrones were used was during the 1963 conclave. Beginning with the August 1978 conclave, canopied thrones were no longer used due to the lack of space resulting from the large increase in the number of cardinal electors, necessitating two rows of seats (two on each side, a total of four). The amount of rows were bumped up to six (three each on the left and right side) in 2005 and 2013, and ten (forming a U-Shape) in 2025.

==== Secretary tradition ====
At the end of the conclave, the new pope could give his cardinalitial zucchetto or skull cap to the secretary of the conclave, indicating the secretary would be made cardinal at the next consistory to create cardinals. Prior to the 2013 conclave, this tradition was last followed at the 1958 conclave by the newly elected Pope John XXIII, who bestowed his cardinal's skull cap on Alberto di Jorio and created him a cardinal at the consistory on 15 December 1958. In 2013, the Portuguese section of Vatican Radio reported that at the conclusion of the 2013 conclave, the newly elected Pope Francis bestowed his cardinalitial zucchetto on Archbishop Lorenzo Baldisseri, the secretary of that conclave. On 22 February 2014, at Pope Francis's first consistory, Baldisseri was formally made a cardinal with the title of Cardinal-Deacon of Sant'Anselmo all'Aventino.

==== Room of Tears ====
The new pope goes to the Room of Tears, a small red room next to the Sistine Chapel. The room carries the nickname because of the strong emotions experienced by the new pope. The new pope dresses by himself, choosing a set of pontifical robes—consisting of a white cassock, rochet, and red mozzetta—from three sizes provided. He then dons a gold corded pectoral cross, a red and gold embroidered stole, and then the white papal zucchetto on his head. In 2013, Pope Francis departed from tradition by forgoing the red mozzetta, rochet, and gold pectoral cross, appearing on the central balcony in only the white cassock and his personal pectoral cross. He donned the stole solely to impart the apostolic blessing, removing it immediately afterward. In 2025, Pope Leo XIV chose to return to the traditional attire, appearing in the red mozzetta, rochet, gold pectoral cross, and stole.

==== Proclamation ====
Next, the protodeacon of the College of Cardinals, the senior cardinal deacon, appears at the loggia of the basilica to proclaim the new pope. He usually proceeds with the following traditional Latin formula, assuming that a cardinal has been elected:

Annuntio vobis gaudium magnum;
habemus papam:
Eminentissimum ac Reverendissimum Dominum,
Dominum [prænomen]
Sanctae Romanae Ecclesiae Cardinalem [nomen]
qui sibi nomen imposuit [nomen pontificale].

Translation:

I announce to you a great joy;
we have a pope:
The Most Eminent and Most Reverend Lord,
Lord [forename]
Cardinal of the Holy Roman Church [surname]
who has taken the name [papal name].

During the announcement for Pope Benedict XVI's election, the protodeacon, Cardinal Jorge Medina, first greeted the crowds with "Dear brothers and sisters" in several different languages before proceeding to the Latin announcement. This was not done when Pope Francis and Pope Leo XIV were elected.

In the past, the protodeacon has himself been elected pope. In such an event, the announcement is made by the next senior deacon, who has thus succeeded as protodeacon. The last time the cardinal protodeacon was elected was in 1513, when Giovanni de Medici was elected as Pope Leo X and the next senior cardinal deacon Alessandro Farnese (the future Pope Paul III) made the announcement. After the election of Pope Leo XIII in 1878, Protodeacon Prospero Caterini appeared and started to make the announcement but was physically incapable of completing it, so another made it for him. (Note: Richard Henry Clarke's book about Leo XIII claims that Prospero Caterini made the announcement and Salvador Miranda's entry on Cardinal Caterini at The Cardinals of the Holy Roman Church website mentions Caterini as having given the announcement but Francis Burkle-Young claims that Caterini started to make the announcement but was incapable of completing the spoken formula and was ultimately assisted by Bartolomeo Grassi-Landi, a non-cardinal and the conclavist of Cardinal Luigi Oreglia di Santo Stefano)

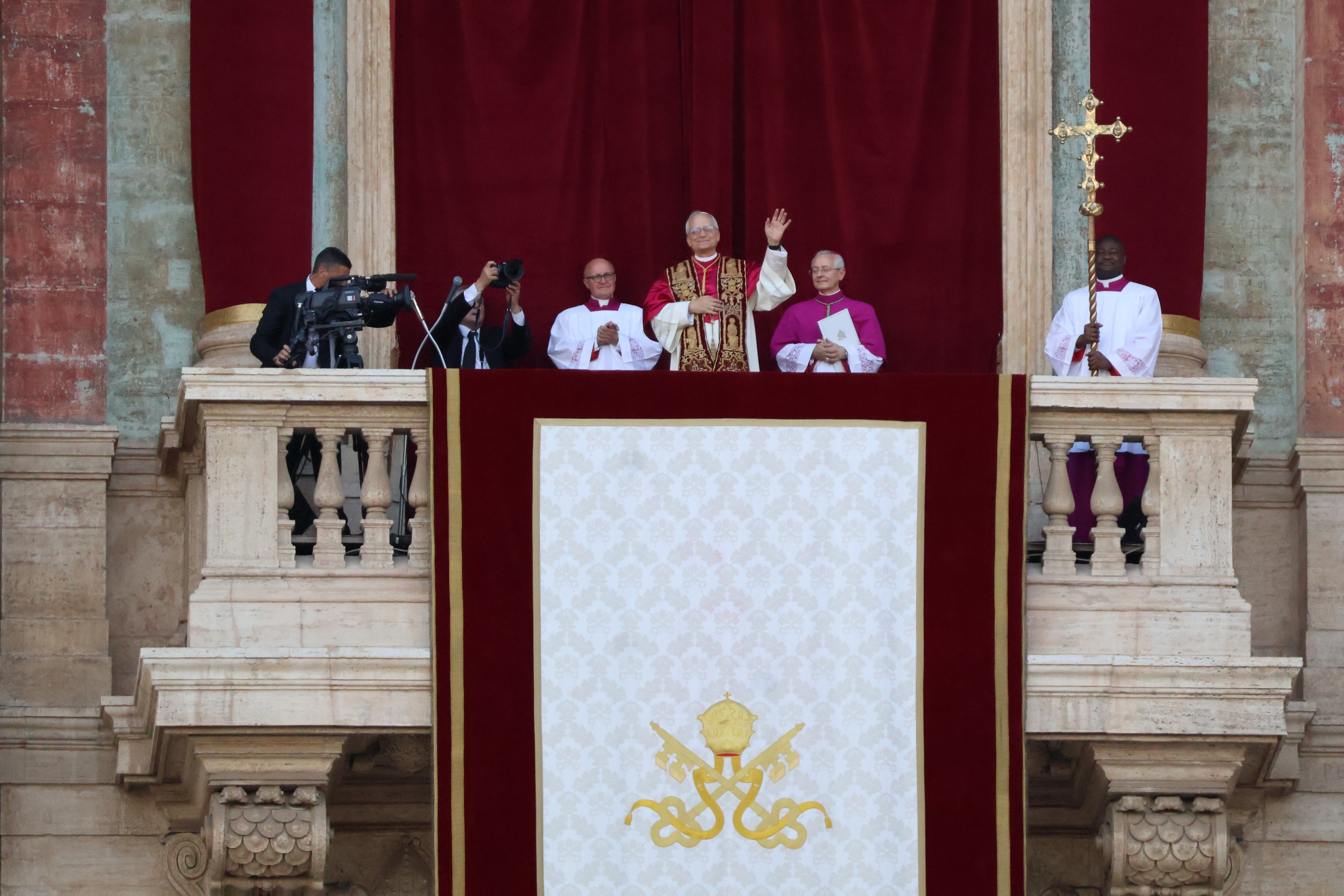
The newly elected Pope Leo XIV waving from the central loggia of St. Peter's Basilica in his first public appearance after the 2025 papal conclave

Following the announcement, the senior cardinal deacon retreats, and papal aides unfurl a large, maroon banner that out of practicality often bears the late pope's arms in the centre, draping it onto the railing of the basilica's loggia. During John Paul II's announcement, the inner portion of the arms of Paul VI were simply covered due to the short pontificate of John Paul I not allowing sufficient time for a banner with the latter's arms to be created. For Francis's announcement, there was no image of his predecessor's arms due to Benedict XVI still being alive. For Leo XIV's announcement, the banner featured the arms of the Holy See. During Pope Pius XI's first appearance following his election at the 1922 conclave, the banner showed the arms of Pope Pius IX instead of the arms of his immediate predecessor Pope Benedict XV.

The new pope then emerges onto the balcony to the adulation of the crowd, while a brass band in the forecourt below plays the Pontifical Anthem. He then imparts the Urbi et Orbi blessing. The pope may on this occasion choose to give the shorter episcopal blessing as his first apostolic blessing instead of the traditional Urbi et Orbi blessing. This happened most recently with Pope Paul VI after his election at the 1963 conclave.

Beginning with Pope John Paul II, the last four popes elected, including Pope Leo XIV, have chosen to address the crowds first before imparting the Urbi et Orbi blessing. Also, at Pope Francis's first appearance, he first led the faithful in prayers for his predecessor and then asked them to pray for himself, before imparting the Urbi et Orbi blessing. Pope Leo XIV spoke in Spanish in part of his remarks, the first time a pope has used a language to address a crowd other than Italian following a conclave. Leo XIV was also the first observed to have used written notes while addressing the crowd.

==== Coronation and inauguration ====
Formerly, the popes were crowned by the triregnum, or triple tiara, at the papal coronation. All popes since John Paul I have refused an elaborate coronation, choosing instead to have a simpler papal inauguration ceremony.

== Relevant documents ==
- In nomine Domini (1059)
- Quia propter (1215)
- Ubi periculum (1274)
- Ne Romani (1312)
- In Eligendis (1562)
- Aeterni Patris Filius (1621)
- Commissum Nobis (1904)
- Vacante Sede Apostolica (1904)
- Cum proxime (1922)
- Vacantis Apostolicae Sedis (1945)
- Summi Pontificis electio (1962)
- Ingravescentem aetatem (1970)
- Romano Pontifici eligendo (1975)
- Universi Dominici gregis (1996)
- De electione Romani Pontificis (2007)
- Normas nonnullas (2013)

== In popular culture ==
- The Dan Brown novel Angels & Demons (2000), itself adapted onto a film in 2009, concerns four papabile being kidnapped right as the conclave starts, and their murders cause much concern to the other cardinals.
- A papal conclave is the subject of the 2024 film Conclave, itself adapted from a 2016 novel. While the cardinals and plot are fictional and dramatised, the rituals are correctly shown, according to experts. Some of the rituals include the sequestering in the Sistine Chapel, the burning of ballots, the use of smoke signals, and the destruction of a deceased pope's ring.

== See also ==
- Conclave capitulation
- Elective monarchy
- Index of Vatican City–related articles
- List of papal conclaves
- Papal appointment
- Politics of Vatican City
- Religious democracy
