= Romano Pontifici eligendo =

Apostolic constitution by Paul VI

Romano Pontifici eligendo Latin for 'Regarding the election of the Roman Pontiff' Apostolic constitution of Pope Paul VI
- Signature date: 1 October 1975
- Subject: Papal election
- Text: In Latin

Romano Pontifici eligendo was the apostolic constitution governing the election of popes that was promulgated by Pope Paul VI on 1 October 1975. It instituted a number of far-reaching reforms in the process of electing popes. It set the maximum number of electors at 120 and restated in a more formal context the rule he had already instituted that cardinals over the age of 80 not participate in electing a pope.

The constitution was superseded by Universi Dominici gregis.

== Provisions ==
In November 1970, in Ingravescentem aetatem, Pope Paul VI had prohibited cardinals over the age of eighty from participating in a papal conclave to elect a pope. This new apostolic constitution incorporated that rule in the context of setting out regulations for the organization of a conclave. (Note: John Paul II modified this regulation slightly in Universi Dominici gregis, changing the date by which the cardinal elector must not have turned 80 from the day the conclave begins to the day the pope dies.)

In March 1973, during a consistory to create new cardinals, Pope Paul VI had discussed plans to modify procedures for papal elections, including limiting the number of electors to 120 and adding as voters the patriarchs of the Eastern Rite churches, even if not cardinals, and the leadership of the Synod of Bishops. He abandoned all of those ideas except one, and set the maximum number of cardinal electors at 120 in this apostolic constitution. When his 80-year-old limit had taken effect on 1 January 1971, there were 102 cardinals eligible to participate in a conclave. He did not specify a procedure to determine which cardinals would serve as electors if there were more than 120 cardinals eligible to participate in a conclave. The 2025 conclave was the first conclave where the number of cardinal electors exceeded the limit of 120 cardinal electors. In response, a general congregation of the College of Cardinals issued a declaration that all cardinal electors present in the conclave have the right to vote for the new pope.

Pope Paul VI also imposed strict regulations on the physical organization of a conclave, including a requirement that the windows of the Sistine Chapel be boarded up. Cardinals found the restrictions excessive during the two conclaves of 1978 and Pope John Paul II dropped them in his 1996 apostolic constitution Universi Dominici gregis (1996).

Pope Paul had been crowned in June 1963 following his election but abandoned the wearing of a papal tiara in November 1964. Nevertheless, in this apostolic constitution he wrote that a coronation would follow the election. His immediate successors John Paul I and John Paul II chose not to be crowned, and John Paul II made no mention of a coronation when he revised the election process in 1996.
