= Universi Dominici gregis =

1996 apostolic constitution of Pope John Paul II

Universi Dominici Gregis Latin for 'The Lord's whole flock' Apostolic constitution of Pope John Paul II
- Signature date: 22 February 1996
- Subject: Papal election
- Text: In Latin; In English

Universi Dominici gregis is an apostolic constitution of the Catholic Church issued by Pope John Paul II on 22 February 1996. It superseded Pope Paul VI's 1975 apostolic constitution, Romano Pontifici eligendo, and all previous apostolic constitutions and orders on the subject of the election of the pope.

Universi Dominici gregis ("the Lord's whole flock", from the opening statement "The Shepherd of the Lord's whole flock is the Bishop of the Church of Rome"), subtitled On the Vacancy of the Apostolic See and the Election of the Roman Pontiff, deals with the vacancy of the See of Rome, i.e., the papacy. The constitution modified, or in some cases confirmed, the rules for the conclave. It also clarified, during a sede vacante, which matters could be handled by the College of Cardinals and which matters were reserved for the future pope.

The constitution was later amended by Pope Benedict XVI with the motu proprios De aliquibus mutationibus in normis de electione Romani pontificis in 2007 and by Normas nonnullas in 2013.

== Contents ==
Universi Dominici gregis consists of an introduction followed by a body of 92 numbered sections, normally just one paragraph but occasionally more than one, and a concluding "Promulgation", which activates the document. The body is divided into two parts, but the 92 sections are numbered continuously.

Part One

During a sede vacante, the College has no power in things which pertain to the pope during his lifetime or of his office. Any such act that the College exercises beyond the limits expressly permitted by this document is null and void.

- To be eligible to vote, a cardinal must be no more than eighty years of age on the day before the death or resignation of the pope. (Note: This was a slight change from Paul VI's Ingravescentem aetatem (1970), which set the 80-year age based on the start of the conclave rather than the day of the pope's death or resignation.)
- The maximum number of cardinal electors who can participate in a conclave is 120.
- A vote may or may not be taken on the afternoon of the first day. If such a vote occurs, only one vote shall take place and it is counted separately for purposes of determining when a change in the balloting requirements can be made, as explained elsewhere in this constitution.
- Excluding the afternoon of the first day, a maximum of four votes are taken each day, two votes in the morning and two in the afternoon.
- On the first 33 ballots taken (or 34, if a ballot was cast on the afternoon of the first day), a pope shall be elected by a vote of two-thirds of those participating in the conclave. Thereafter, an absolute majority of the conclave participants may change the rule that a two-thirds vote is required for election to a different threshold, but a valid election always requires an absolute majority of the votes. (This was later modified by Benedict XVI.)

Part Two

Chapter II deals with arrangements involving the public viewing and burial of the deceased pope and matters after his death and it provides for the organization of the College into a General Congregation and a Particular Congregation.

- The General Congregation consists of the entire College of Cardinals. Attendance at meetings is mandatory for all cardinals who have arrived at the Vatican to participate in the selection of the new pope except for those over age 80, whose attendance is optional. This Congregation handles matters of major importance that cannot be handled by the Particular Congregation.
- The Particular Congregation consists of the Cardinal Camerlengo and three Cardinals, one from each order chosen by lot from the General Congregation. Except for the Camerlengo, the term of each of these three cardinals is three days. This Congregation handles routine matters. Any decision of a Particular Congregation cannot be changed by a later Particular Congregation, but only by a majority vote of the General Congregation.

== Major changes ==
=== Secrecy ===
Strict secrecy is to be ensured throughout the process. Anyone violating the security of the Vatican, introducing recording equipment, or communicating with a cardinal elector in any way, risks excommunication. Other penalties are at the discretion of the incoming Pope. Participants are required to take oaths of secrecy.

=== Methods of election ===
Previously, in addition to secret ballot two other methods were allowed for the conduct of the election. A committee of nine to fifteen unanimously chosen cardinals might have been delegated, to make the choice for all (election by compromise, per compromissum). Alternatively, formal ballots could be discarded: in election by acclamation (per acclamationem seu inspirationem), the electors simultaneously shouted out the name of their preferred candidate.

Both of these methods were abolished in 1996: the rationale given was that either compromise or acclamation would not require each cardinal to express his preference. Also, these two methods tended to produce controversy, and in any case neither had been used for centuries: the last compromise election was of Pope John XXII in 1316, and the last affirmation (acclamation) election was of Innocent XI in 1676.

As a result, election by secret ballot is now the sole method of electing a Pope, noting this was the de facto situation since 1689.

=== Living quarters ===
Universi Dominici gregis provided that cardinals would be housed in Domus Sanctae Marthae, a building with dormitory type accommodation built within the Vatican City. Previously, cardinals were housed in improvised accommodations, which were often noted for not being particularly comfortable.

=== Other ===
- New voting procedures allowed for the election of a pope by a simple majority in certain circumstances.
- For the first time in centuries cardinals were to be housed in apartments separate from the Sistine Chapel.
- The method by which a pope symbolically took office was made less specific. Whereas Pope Paul's Romano Pontifici Eligendo spoke of a coronation, the new apostolic constitution referred to the "inauguration of the pontificate" without choosing between an enthronement ceremony, a papal coronation or the papal inauguration used since 1978. (Note: In his inauguration homily, Pope John Paul II said: "In past centuries, when the Successor of Peter took possession of his See, the triregnum or tiara was placed on his head. The last Pope to be crowned was Paul VI in 1963, but after the solemn coronation ceremony he never used the tiara again and left his Successors free to decide in this regard. Pope John Paul I, whose memory is so vivid in our hearts, did not wish to have the tiara; nor does his Successor wish it today. This is not the time to return to a ceremony and an object considered, wrongly, to be a symbol of the temporal power of the Popes.)
- The document anticipated the possibility of a papal resignation when specifying that the procedures it prescribes should be observed "even if the vacancy of the Apostolic See should occur as a result of the resignation of the Supreme Pontiff".(para. 77)

== Later use and amendment ==
The only papal election held under these rules without amendment was that of 2005 that chose John Paul's successor Benedict XVI.

On 11 June 2007, Pope Benedict XVI reinstated the requirement that a papal election require a two-thirds majority regardless of the number of ballots taken.

After Pope Benedict XVI announced his resignation, on 25 February 2013, he issued another decree, Normas nonnullas, which allowed the College of Cardinals to bring forward the start of a conclave once all cardinals electors are present or delay the start a few days if serious reasons justify the change in scheduling. He also amended the rules to declare automatic excommunication of any non-cardinal who broke the oath of secrecy of the College of Cardinals during the proceedings. Previously any such person was subject to punishment at the discretion of the new pope. The new rules were first applied in the 2013 conclave that elected Pope Francis.

== See also ==
- Papal veto
- Conclave capitulation
- Pascendi Dominici gregis
