= Bruno Bartoloni =

Italian journalist and writer (1940–2024)

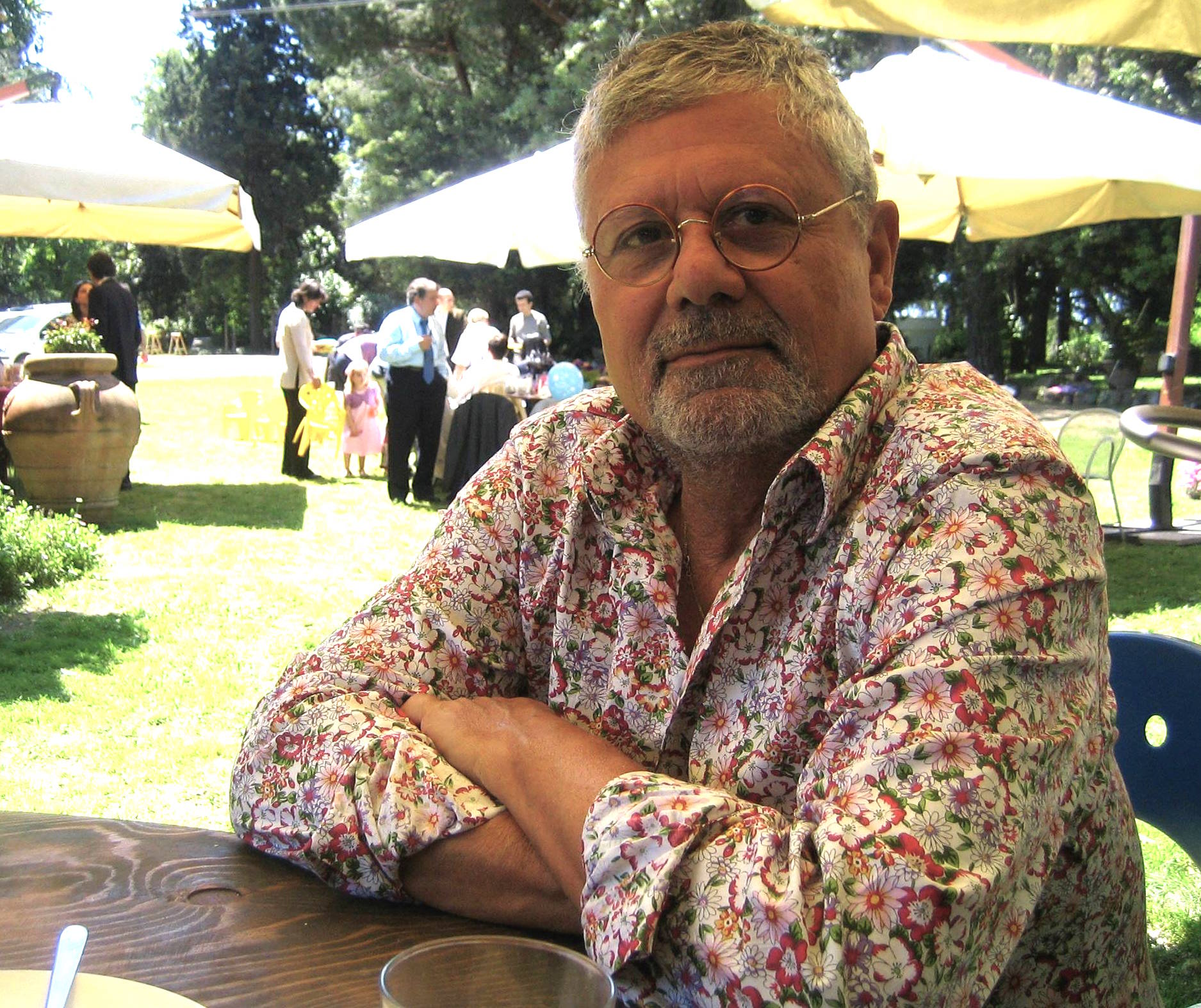
- Bartoloni in 2017
- Born: 26 March 1940; Rome, Italy
- Died: 18 October 2024 (aged 84); Rome, Italy
- Occupations: Journalist; Writer

Bruno Bartoloni (26 March 1940 – 18 October 2024) was an Italian journalist and writer.

== Life and career ==
Born in Rome on 26 March 1940, Bartoloni was the son of journalist Giulio Bartoloni and Marianne Dorn-Warschauer, a German Jew who was the granddaughter of Felix Mendelssohn. He converted to Catholicism to escape deportation by the Nazis, which later led him to become a vaticanist. Growing up, he accompanied his father to the Vatican. Once he finished his secondary school studies, he began working as a journalist and was involved in the premature announcement of the death of Pope Pius XII. He worked as a freelancer before joining Agence France Presse in 1961 where he remained until 1 June 2005, the day before the death of Pope John Paul II. He remained active until his death, writing for Corriere della Sera, Paris Match, France Télévisions, BFM TV, and Radio France Internationale.

Bartoloni died in Rome on 18 October 2024, at the age of 84.

== Works ==
- Le Vatican et ses papes (2008)
- Le roman du Vatican secret (2009)
- Lo Orecchie del Vaticano (2012)
- Le ali di Leonardo sul vento del Bosforo (2013)
- Un juif au Vatican (2018)
