= Rocco Palmo =

American Catholic commentator and writer

- Born: 1973 (age 52–53)
- Education: B.A. University of Pennsylvania
- Occupations: Roman Catholic journalist and blogger
- Political party: Democrat

Rocco Palmo (born 1973) is a Catholic commentator and writer living in Philadelphia, Pennsylvania.

== Education ==
Palmo was raised in a large Italian family in South Philadelphia. He is a great-nephew of the onetime papal Secretary of State Cardinal Pietro Gasparri. He has a B.A. in political science from the University of Pennsylvania. As of 2013, he still lives in South Philadelphia.

== Career ==
Palmo's blog "Whispers in the Loggia" (2004-2021) was focused primarily on Catholic ecclesiastical happenings in North America. Palmo verified all his reports with three sources before publishing. Palmo was previously US correspondent for the London-based Catholic weekly The Tablet, and he is a former columnist for the online magazine Busted Halo.

National Public Radio profiled Palmo, stating that his blog: "...has become a must-read for many Catholics — even some inside the Vatican." Archbishop Emeritus Robert James Carlson of St. Louis is quoted as saying he reads "Whispers in the Loggia" with some regularity. Palmo is frequently cited by major publications including USA Today, The St. Louis Post-Dispatch and the New York Times. He was interviewed by National Public Radio on February 27, 2013, about the papal conclave to name a successor to retiring Pope Benedict XVI.

In April 2011 he was named as one of two chairs of the Vatican's first conference on the blogosphere/social media. In March 2012 Archbishop Charles Chaput, OFM Cap named Palmo a member of a new Archdiocesan Pastoral Council, the first body of its kind to be established in Philadelphia.

A post on X by Palmo on April 14, 2025 about deportations during the second presidency of Donald Trump was reposted by Cardinal Robert Prevost, and was his most recent post on the platform prior to being named as Pope Leo XIV at the 2025 papal conclave.
