= 2025 conclave =

Election of current Catholic pope

Papal conclave May 2025

Dates and location
- 7–8 May 2025; Sistine Chapel, Apostolic Palace, Vatican City

Key officials
- Dean: Giovanni Battista Re
- Sub-dean: Leonardo Sandri
- Camerlengo: Kevin Joseph Farrell
- Protopriest: Michael Michai Kitbunchu
- Protodeacon: Dominique Mamberti
- Secretary: Ilson de Jesus Montanari

Election
- Electors: 133 (list)
- Candidates: See papabili
- Ballots: 4

Elected pope
- Robert Francis Prevost; Name taken: Leo XIV
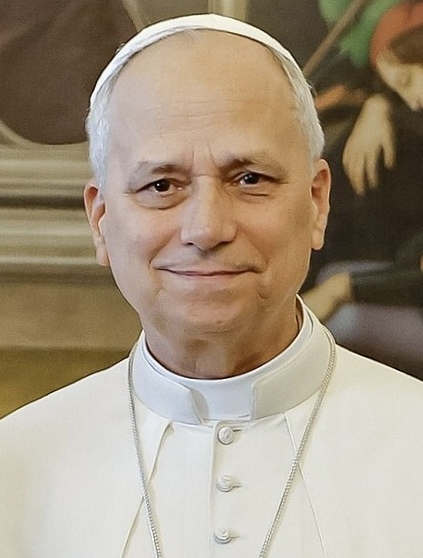

A conclave was held on 7 and 8 May 2025 to elect a new pope to succeed Francis, who had died on 21 April 2025. Of the 135 eligible cardinal electors, all but two attended. On the fourth ballot, the conclave elected Cardinal Robert Francis Prevost, the prefect of the Dicastery for Bishops and president of the Pontifical Commission for Latin America. After accepting his election, he took the name Leo XIV.

== Papal election process ==
The papal election process proper began sixteen days after the 21 April 2025 death of Pope Francis. As in the 2013 conclave, the dean and vice-dean of the College of Cardinals were both over 80 and ineligible to participate. In 2025, these were Giovanni Battista Re and Leonardo Sandri, respectively. The most senior elector under 80, Pietro Parolin, who was also Cardinal Secretary of State, presided over the 2025 conclave.

=== Timing and procedures ===
According to John Paul II's 1996 apostolic constitution Universi Dominici gregis, as amended by Benedict XVI's 2013 apostolic letter Normas nonnullas, the cardinals had at least 15 days after the Holy See became vacant to convene. The cardinals had the discretion to start the conclave earlier or up to 20 days after the pope's cathedra became vacant. On 28 April 2025, two days after Francis's funeral, the fifth general congregation of the cardinals set the conclave to begin on 7 May 2025.

=== Cardinal electors ===
Cardinal electors by region
Graphic with the numbers of cardinal electors in attendance from each region
Region	Number
Italy	17
Rest of Europe	35
North America	20
South America	17
Asia	23
Oceania	4
Africa	17
Total	133

Cardinals aged 80 years or older on the day before the papacy fell vacant were ineligible to participate. At the time of Francis's death, there were 252 cardinals, of whom 135 were under 80 and thus were not precluded from participation and voting in the conclave. Of these potential electors, 108 (80%) had been elevated to the College of Cardinals by Francis; the cardinal electors were also global and more diverse than in any prior conclave – they came from more than 70 countries and in many cases were the first cardinal ever appointed from their country.

Since the 1975 promulgation of Romano Pontifici eligendo by Pope Paul VI and the 1996 apostolic constitution Universi Dominici gregis by Pope John Paul II, the maximum number of cardinal electors had been 'set' at 120. At 133, the 2025 conclave was the largest ever, and the first conclave where this purported limit was exceeded on the day the papacy became vacant. (Note: There have been more than 120 cardinal electors at several other points since 1975 but not at the time of a conclave.) Any cardinal under the age of 80 not having renounced or lost his voting rights has the right to vote in a conclave under Catholic canon law, with no mechanism for excluding otherwise eligible Cardinals, should the limit be exceeded at the time of a conclave. A pope appointing more than 120 eligible cardinal electors effectively renders the 1975 limit void, as popes John Paul II, Benedict XVI, and Francis all did; although in the cases of 2005 and 2013, the 120 limit at the time of the conclave was not surpassed.

On 30 April 2025, the general congregation of cardinals confirmed that all cardinal electors present for the conclave beginning on 7 May could vote. Ineligible cardinals could nevertheless attend the general congregations and participate in discussions preceding the conclave. Although the conclave cardinals have the authority to elect any Catholic male who has been baptized, the last time a non-cardinal was elected was in the 1378 conclave.

==== Non-participating ====
After saying he would try to participate in the conclave, Cardinal Giovanni Angelo Becciu, who had "renounced his rights as a cardinal" in 2020 owing to his involvement in a financial scandal, stated that he would abide by Francis's wish that he refrain from participating. Health problems prevented cardinals Antonio Cañizares Llovera of Spain and John Njue of Kenya from participating in the conclave, reducing the number of potential electors to 133; accordingly, the two-thirds supermajority required to elect the new pope was determined at 89 votes. This was the largest number of cardinal electors ever to participate and vote in a conclave.

== Speculation ==
Francis's hospitalization in February and March 2025 fueled speculation about an impending conclave. Owing to the major international expansion of the membership of the College of Cardinals under Francis to 252, with more than 140 non-European cardinals appointed during his pontificate, some observers had suggested a non-European pope was likely. The 2025 conclave was initially planned to have 135 electors from 71 countries; the 2013 and 2005 conclaves had had 115 electors from 48 and 52 countries, respectively. Some of the participating cardinals did not speak Italian, the working language of the Roman Curia.

Following the Italian saying "fat pope, thin pope", some commentators predicted that Francis's successor would be more conservative. There were also concerns of interference, which had been prohibited in 1996 by John Paul II, and a potential hostile takeover by ultraconservative politicians and Catholics. As of the third and fourth general congregations, there was reportedly a desire among the cardinals for a ten-year pope, someone in his late seventies with experience in the Roman Curia who would be more focused on internal affairs.

Some commentators posited a younger pope as more likely; others felt that cardinals such as Pierbattista Pizzaballa (who had turned 60 the day of Francis's death) and Robert Prevost (then aged 69) were too young. Many cardinals expressed hope for a short conclave, as in 2005 and 2013. Given the complexities and heterogeneity of this conclave, compared to the two-day one that elected Francis in 2013, Cardinal Rainer Woelki expected the 2025 conclave to take longer; and cardinals Louis Raphaël I Sako and Gregorio Rosa Chávez anticipated a short conclave of two or three days, with the latter remarking "maximum three days".

=== Papabili ===
Vaticanologists consider (by a variety of criteria) some cardinals to be more likely to become pope than others – these are the papabili (the plural for papabile), Italian for "pope-able". In practice, however, conclaves have not always chosen one of the papabili. Prior to his election in the October 1978 conclave, John Paul II was not considered to be in the running. This is reflected in the saying "He who enters the conclave as pope, leaves it as a cardinal," although the frontrunner is often elected pope, as was the case in 1939 (Pius XII), 1963 (Paul VI), and 2005 (Benedict XVI). Anna Rowlands, a Vaticanologist, suggested that attempts to predict the conclave's outcome were based in "pure speculation". Media worldwide released papabili analyses on the day of Pope Francis's death. Papabili mentioned in the media included Anders Arborelius, Jean-Marc Aveline, Fridolin Ambongo Besungu, Timothy Dolan, Wim Eijk, Péter Erdő, Fernando Filoni, William Goh, Mario Grech, Claudio Gugerotti, Pietro Parolin, Pierbattista Pizzaballa, Malcolm Ranjith, Robert Sarah, Marcello Semeraro, Luis Antonio Tagle, José Tolentino de Mendonça, Peter Turkson, Lazarus You Heung-sik, and Matteo Zuppi.

Robert Prevost, the eventual elected pope, was speculated on as papabile, being the prefect of the powerful Dicastery for Bishops, an ally of Francis, and a possible compromise candidate; however, he was considered a dark horse, and his American nationality had been regarded as a potential stumbling block to his candidacy, reflecting unease about enhancing the United States's geopolitical power after the re-election of Donald Trump in 2024. Supporters argued that Prevost represented a "dignified middle of the road". Some commentators felt that a non-European pope was likely owing to the increased numbers of African and Asian cardinals, which reportedly ultimately collapsed Parolin's candidacy. By contrast, others felt that a European pope was a more likely outcome, remaining convinced that the reasons for why an American pope had never been elected before, namely the American status as superpower, still applied. James Bretzke, a theology professor at John Carroll University in Ohio, told USA Today that the best possible candidate was one who could be a diplomat, adding: "America's image in the world simply is too powerful – and to be blunt, ugly."

=== Betting ===
Before the announcement of the conclave itself, prediction markets were using market mechanisms to calculate who might be in the running and their putative rankings.

Upon Francis's death, the top five contenders were Tagle, Parolin, Zuppi, Ambongo, and Erdő, all of whom had been cited by Vatican journalists and analysts as papabili. On the day of Prevost's election, the leading candidates on Polymarket were Parolin at 37%, Tagle at 26%, Pizzaballa at 10%, Erdő at 8%, Turkson at 7%, Sarah at 4%, and Zuppi at 3%. Parolin's odds to be named as the new pope jumped to nearly 70% after the white smoke was revealed, with many suspecting that the relatively short four-round conclave indicated a consensus candidate had been chosen.

Fantapapa (Italian for 'Fantasy Pope') was a fantasy league based in Italy for betting nominal sums on papal conclaves. Established by anti-gambling advocates Pietro Pace and Mauro Vanetti specifically for the 2025 conclave, the sole payout was "eternal glory". By 5 May 2025, it had 75,000 players in Italy, where no licensed platform offers gambling on conclaves. Fantapapa players chose from and ranked eleven cardinals; other aspects of the conclave, such as the papal name, language, number of rounds, and the day on which white smoke appears, were also available to bet on. Players gained points in accordance to their team members being "mentioned prominently" in domestic and international media coverage. The fantasy league was open to punters internationally and also offered mini-lessons in the Italian language.

== Pre-conclave events ==
=== Logistical preparations ===
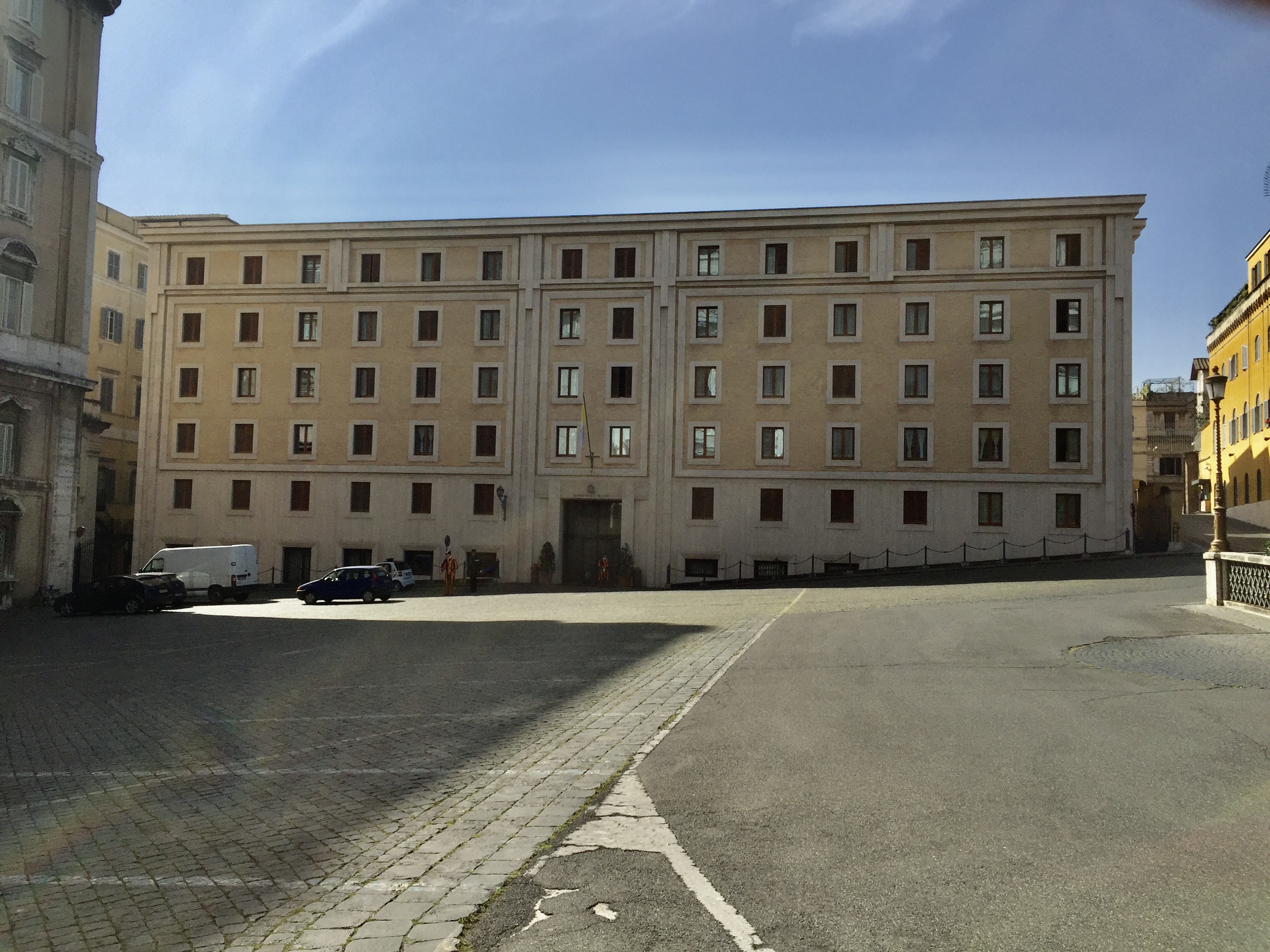
Cardinals participating in the conclave stayed at Domus Sanctae Marthae.

Following the death of Pope Francis, preparations began at Domus Sanctae Marthae for housing the cardinal electors. These included setting up barriers or opaque film at the windows to prevent outside contact and the construction of spaces for the celebration of the Sacrament of Penance, private prayer, and meals. Signal jammers were used to isolate the electors from Bluetooth, Wi-Fi, and mobile networks. Because the building has only 129 bedrooms, it was necessary to provide accommodations for the 133 electors and support personnel, who stayed at Santa Marta Vecchia, next door to the main dormitory.

In the Sistine Chapel, preparations included the addition of tables and chairs in the manner of choir stalls and the covering of windows; the ballot-burning stove and the chimney, which together serve to signal the results to the outside world, were installed, as was a temporary wooden floor which served to protect the marble inlay, provide a more level surface, and hide electronic signal jammers. Both the Domus Sanctae Marthae and the Sistine Chapel were thoroughly inspected in advance of the conclave for any unauthorized devices. On 2 May, Vatican firefighters installed the chimney for the Sistine Chapel.

The Vatican Gendarmerie, under the leadership of Gianluca Gauzzi Broccoletti, faced many counter-espionage challenges in protecting conclave integrity. The Corps of Gendarmerie used the 650 security cameras in the Vatican, encrypted messaging, and endpoint detection and response to secure the conclave. Meals for the 2025 conclave featured simple dishes typical of Lazio and Abruzzo, the regions of Italy nearest the Vatican.

=== General congregations ===
Map of the major venues of the conclave

According to Catholic canon law, general congregations are daily meetings of all cardinals regardless of elector status and begin before all of the elector cardinals arrive in Rome. The initial meetings are focused on the logistics of the papal funeral and the conclave, including physical preparations at the Domus Sanctae Marthae (as a dormitory) and the Sistine Chapel (as a polling place). Later ones, typically the eighth and following, shift to discussions about the needs of the church and the world, and the issues facing the Roman Curia. These later general congregations are guided by the reflections given by two "distinguished and morally authoritative" clerics who are selected by the cardinals. The cardinals are also given the opportunity to make formal remarks regarding the issues facing the church. All of these speeches and discussions are termed interventi ("interventions") in Italian. The general congregations meet in the New Synod Hall, on the first floor of the vestibule of the much larger Paul VI Audience Hall. For the 2025 conclave, the general congregations met every day from 22 April following Francis's death until 6 May, excluding 26–27 April, 1 May, and 4 May, with the beginning of the conclave proper on 7 May.

General congregations allow the cardinals to meet on their own initiative, thereby getting to know each other and exercise their spiritual discernment; many had never met, as Francis did not hold meetings of cardinals before his papal consistories. Furthermore, the cardinals have full access to global media and their diverse analyses and criteria for identifying the papabile. Before leaving for Rome on 24 April, Cardinal Pablo Virgilio David stressed that a conclave is not a political campaign but a religious retreat. He also emphasized that it is a duty of the College of Cardinals to discern each other via prayer, personal letters, and even research on a website with biographical and other information set up for that purpose, and that it is not a matter of candidates. Both the formal and informal discussions are expected to be very substantive in preparation for, and in the hope of, a speedy conclave. The discussions held at cardinals' own initiative—pratiche, or exercises—are the most frank and candid. By canon law, the congregations are bound to the same secrecy as the conclave.

=== Daily summary ===
On 22 April, members of the papal staff and household were asked to vacate their rooms at the Domus Sanctae Marthae following the death of Pope Francis in his suite on the second floor to allow for conclave preparations in that building to begin. The same day, the first of twelve general congregations were held. At the first congregation, the approximately sixty cardinals present listened to Kevin Farrell, the Cardinal Camerlengo, read the will and testament of Francis. The canonization of Carlo Acutis, originally scheduled to take place in Rome on 27 April, was suspended, and the cardinals confirmed the date for the papal funeral. This meeting also dealt with the logistics of the funeral. The attending cardinals took the oath of secrecy concerning their meetings. Despite the fact that general congregations are closed to non-cardinals, Sister Simona Brambilla, a religious sister and the first woman to head a Vatican department (the Dicastery for Institutes of Consecrated Life and Societies of Apostolic Life), was accidentally sent a standard email inviting her to participate. On 23 April, the Vatican Museums announced the closure of the Sistine Chapel beginning on 28 April, owing to the needs of the conclave. At the second congregation, the program for the novendiales, or nine-day period of mourning for the deceased pope, was approved. Cardinal Norberto Rivera Carrera stated to the press that these discussions had been mostly procedural in nature, as many cardinals from around the world were still traveling.

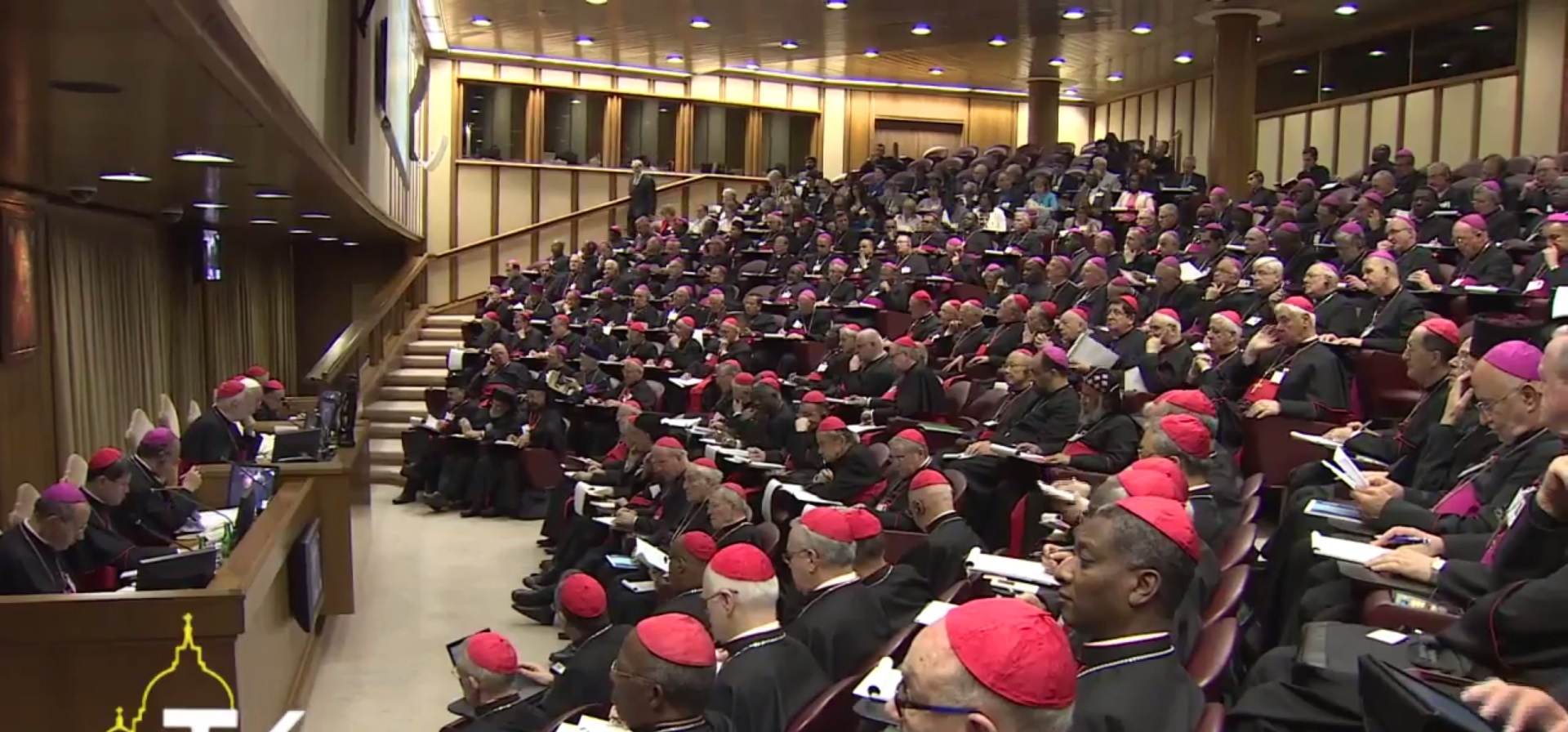
Cardinals and bishops in the New Synod Hall (pictured in 2014), one of the venues for the general congregations

The third congregation on 24 April, with 113 cardinals present, saw the appointment of the two conclave preachers, Donato Ogliari and Cardinal Raniero Cantalamessa. At the fourth general congregation on 25 April, the 149 cardinals in attendance listened to a presentation on Francis's funeral rite. By this time nearly 70 formal speeches, or "interventions", had been given. There was also discussion concerning the status of Giovanni Angelo Becciu as a cardinal elector among the participants, which continued in the following congregations until his 29 April acceptance of his non-elector status.

The fifth general congregation on 28 April determined that the conclave would begin on 7 May, sixteen days following Francis's death. This meeting also discussed the clerical sexual abuse crisis, challenges in evangelization, and ecumenism. Twenty cardinals delivered interventions. Conservative cardinals, such as Gerhard Müller and Francis Arinze (not an elector), were particularly vocal during this session. The next day, at the sixth congregation on 29 April, the start time for the conclave was set at 4:30 p.m., and Cardinal Re was chosen as the celebrant for the opening Mass for the conclave. Donato Ogliari gave his scheduled reflection to the 183 cardinals present, 124 of them being electors, emphasizing the theme of synodality from the Francis papacy.

The seventh congregation on 30 April featured a discussion of the Vatican's financial issues by the 180 cardinals present, 124 of whom were electors. Rainer Woelki stated that the meetings thus far had been "fraternal and cordial ... a very concentrated, calm, factual working atmosphere". Beniamino Stella, not an elector, made a very strongly-worded critique of Francis's decision to allow lay persons to exercise powers of church governance formerly reserved to clergy. This surprised many cardinals, as Stella was viewed as one of Francis's most trusted advisors and a prominent supporter of Parolin.

The general congregation did not meet on 1 May, the feast of Saint Joseph the Worker, a public holiday for the Holy See and an ecclesiastical counterpart to the secular International Workers' Day observed on the same day. The National Catholic Reporter's Rome bureau reported that Prevost was "emerging as a serious frontrunner". At the ninth congregation on 2 May 177 cardinals were present, of whom 127 were electors. Twenty-six cardinals spoke. Among the subjects discussed were: communion (koinonia) within the church and fraternity in and with the world; the hope of some that the next pope would be 'prophetic'; and the 2025 Jubilee. The tenth and eleventh congregations were both held on 5 May and discussed a wide range of church topics. On 6 May, the twelfth and final congregation of the College of Cardinals took place. This congregation witnessed the ceremonial destruction of Francis's symbols of office: his fisherman's ring and lead seal.

== Conclave ==
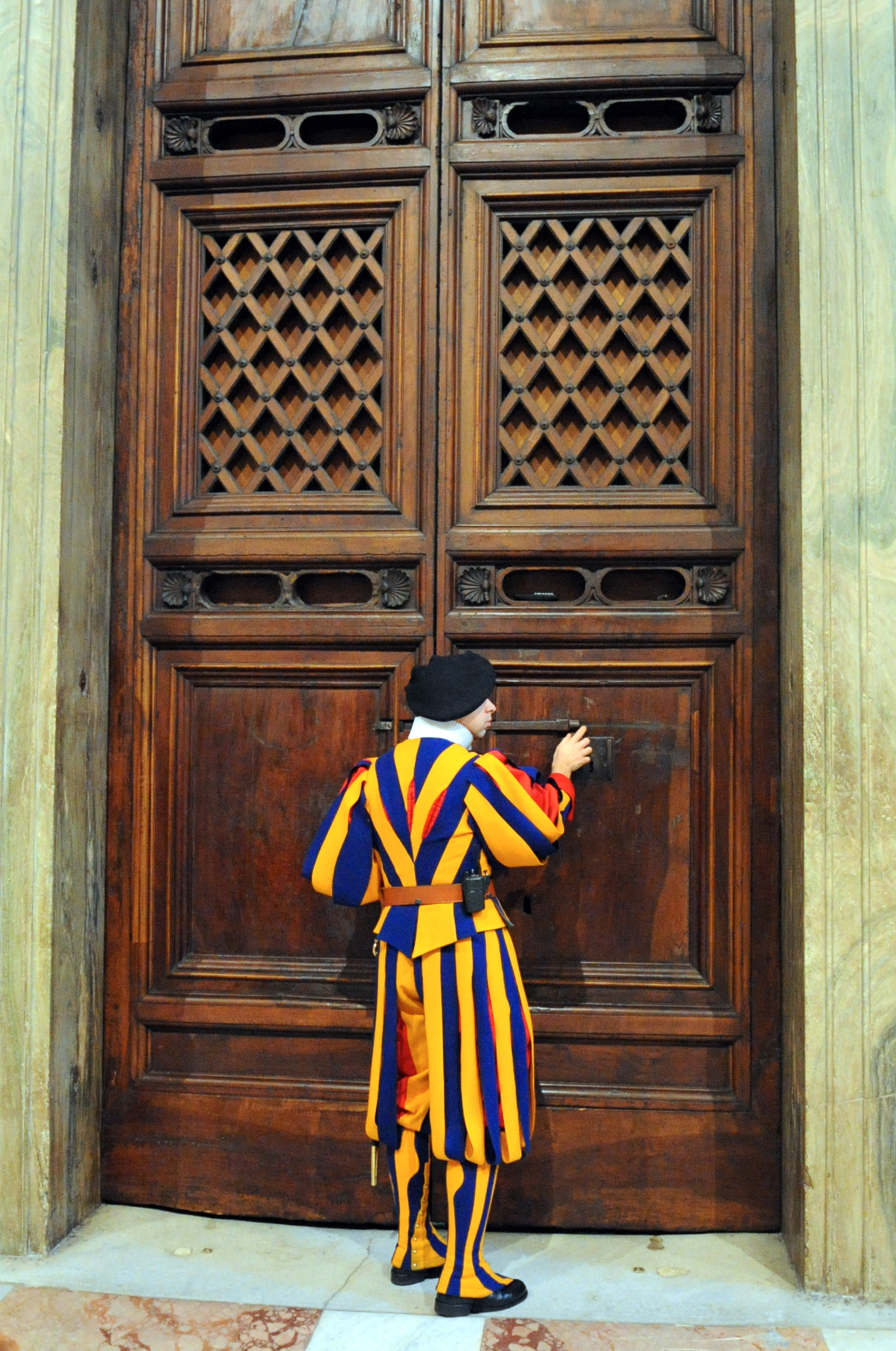
The doors of the Sistine Chapel (pictured in 2014) were shut at 5:46 p.m. on 7 May.

=== Day one ===
On 7 May, the conclave began. It was preceded by Cardinal Giovanni Battista Re, the dean of the College of Cardinals, celebrating the Mass pro eligendo Pontifice (lit. 'for the election of the Pontiff') in St. Peter's Basilica at 10 am CEST (08:00 UTC). All support staff, such as sacristans, medical staff, elevator operators, and the director of security services for the Vatican, along with officers and officials of the conclave, had taken their solemn oath of secrecy on 5 May. At 4:30 pm, the conclave officially began with a prayer service in the Pauline Chapel, at the end of which the electors entered the Sistine Chapel in procession. Once there, the hymn Veni Creator Spiritus ("Come, Creator Spirit") was sung and the 133 cardinal electors then swore themselves to secrecy. Each cardinal elector in order of seniority placed his hands on a Book of the Gospels and made the affirmation aloud in Latin:

Et ego [prænomen] Cardinalis [nomen] spondeo, voveo ac iuro. Sic me Deus adiuvet et haec Sancta Dei Evangelia, quae manu mea tango.

Translation:

And I, [forename] Cardinal [surname], do so promise, pledge, and swear. So help me God and these Holy Gospels, which I touch with my hand.

The Papal master of ceremonies Diego Ravelli then called out the words Extra omnes, a command for everyone who is not a cardinal elector or an official of the conclave to leave the chamber. He then shut the entrance to the Sistine Chapel at 5:46 p.m. Cardinal Raniero Cantalamessa, the longtime Capuchin preacher of the pontifical household, then offered a reflection to the cardinals behind the closed doors. Reportedly, the remarks lasted for more than an hour, delaying the start of the first ballot (and, consequently, the smoke reporting out its results); at one point, Cardinal Parolin asked the assembled cardinal electors if they wanted to postpone the first vote until the next morning – they did not.

Given the conclave had begun in the afternoon, only a single ballot was held on this first day. According to some reports, Parolin, the frontrunner, received more than 40 votes on the first ballot, while the rest of the field was considerably split. According to other reports, Prevost was the most voted candidate in the first ballot, slightly above Parolin, with Péter Erdő, one of the main conservative candidates, in third place. The first day of the conclave ended at 9:00 p.m., after black smoke emerged from the chimney of the Sistine Chapel, signifying that the vote taken had not resulted in the election of a new pope. Vatican Media reported that up to 45,000 people had gathered in St. Peter's Square to await the smoke.

=== Day two ===
White smoke billowing from the Sistine Chapel chimney. Faithful onlookers rejoiced, shouting "Habemus papam!" (Latin for 'We have a pope') and "Viva il papa!" (Italian for 'Long live the pope') in St. Peter's Square.

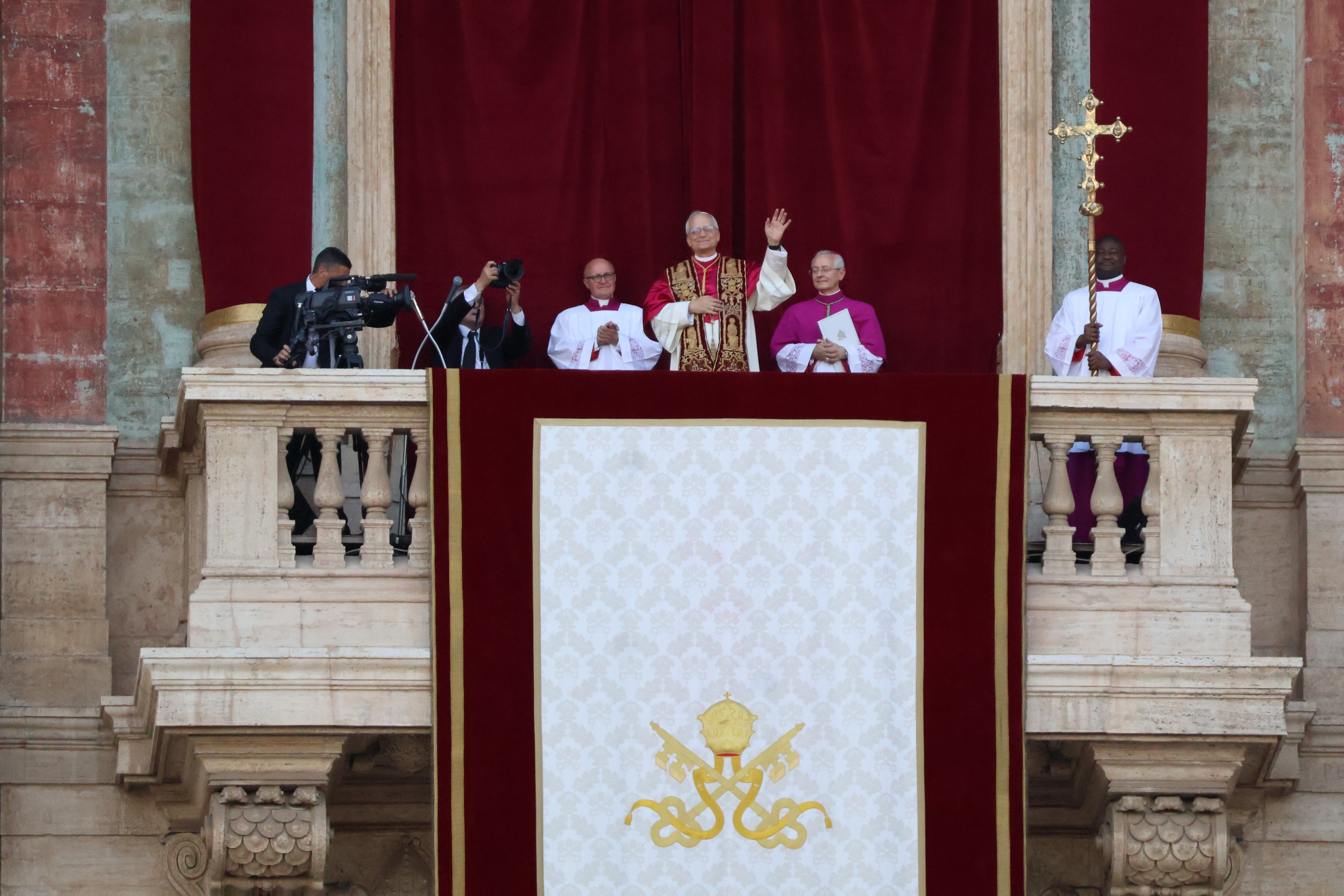
Pope Leo XIV on the loggia of St. Peter's Basilica following his election

The second day of the conclave began with two ballots, concluding at approximately 10:30 a.m. and 11:45 a.m., respectively. Black smoke appeared at 11:51 a.m., again signifying that no pope had been elected. Smoke is not produced after each ballot, but rather only at the end of each session (ballot cards from two unsuccessful votes in a morning session or two votes in an afternoon session are usually burned together once each pair of votes has been completed). According to several reports, during this morning session of day 2, Cardinal Parolin received 40 to 50 votes but failed to pick up support from African and Asian cardinals, some of whom started to support Prevost.

Pope Francis's strongest supporters were divided between Cardinals Jean-Marc Aveline (France) and Mario Grech (Malta), while Asian cardinals were splitting their votes between the two Filipino Cardinals Luis Antonio Tagle and Pablo Virgilio David. Cardinal Prevost enjoyed broad support from South American and Anglosphere cardinals, thanks also to the strong support of Timothy Dolan, who supposedly functioned as something of a kingmaker. The cardinals then returned to the Domus Sanctae Marthae for lunch, where the breadth of support for Prevost became clearer. Cardinals later told the Associated Press that the result was becoming clear by the third ballot, as the votes were moving toward Prevost. Pope Leo XIV later stated that after the third ballot, "I resigned myself to the fact when I saw how things were going and I said 'This could be a reality.'" By the end of the morning session, there were 15,000 people in St. Peter's Square and 5,000 people at the basilica of Santa Maria Maggiore. More were expected during the afternoon session, since in the two most recent conclaves a new pope had been elected on either the fourth or fifth ballot.

After the lunch recess, the cardinals returned to the Sistine Chapel for the next and fourth round of voting. The cardinals' support coalesced around Prevost, who received more than the two-thirds majority of 89 required: he reportedly received more than 100 votes on the fourth (and final) ballot.

Parolin, as the most senior cardinal in the conclave, asked Prevost if he accepted his election as Supreme Pontiff, and by what papal name he would be known. Having quietly accepted his election, Prevost announced to the cardinals his chosen papal name Leo, chosen at least in part to honor Pope Leo XIII. Following the pope's acceptance of his election, the cardinals applauded, and he embraced them. He then exited the Sistine Chapel to the Room of Tears to be robed in the garments prepared there for the new pope.

After the fourth round of voting, white smoke appeared at 6:07 p.m., followed by the ringing of the bells of St. Peter's Basilica, confirming and signifying the election of a new pope. Soon afterwards, the Swiss Guard and members of the Italian Armed Forces, along with the bands of the Gendarmerie Corps of Vatican City State and the Carabinieri, paraded through St. Peter's Square and took up formation beneath the central loggia of St. Peter's Basilica. From there, Cardinal Protodeacon Dominique Mamberti announced the election of Prevost and that he had taken the papal name Leo XIV.

External video
- Announcement of the election of Robert Francis Prevost as Pope Leo XIV

Pope Leo XIV stepped onto the balcony shortly after the official announcement of his election, spoke to the crowd in St. Peter's Square and the world in Italian (while also briefly speaking in Peruvian Spanish to acknowledge the Diocese of Chiclayo, where he previously served as Bishop), expressed gratitude for Francis's legacy, then delivered the Urbi et Orbi blessing. He was accompanied to the central loggia by the Papal master of ceremonies Diego Ravelli, his assistant Marco Agostini, and cross-bearer Jean-Jacques Didier Bouable; and they were joined shortly after by the three senior cardinal electors from each order – Pietro Parolin (senior cardinal bishop), Vinko Puljić (senior cardinal priest), and Dominique Mamberti (senior cardinal deacon).

Immediately after the appearance of white smoke, 40,000 were present in St. Peter's Square; according to Italian law enforcement, by the time of the habemus papam announcement, there were up to 150,000 in the square.

== Post-conclave events ==
The Holy See Press Office announced the schedule of activities and liturgical celebrations following the election of Pope Leo XIV. He celebrated his first Mass as pope with the College of Cardinals in the Sistine Chapel at 11:00 am on 9 May 2025, the day after his election. On 10 May 2025, he met the College of Cardinals in the Synod Hall. In the morning of 11 May, he celebrated a private Mass at the Vatican Grottoes, paying homage to his predecessors, before delivering his first Regina caeli address from the central loggia of St. Peter's Basilica. After the address, Leo broke the seals to the papal apartments of the Apostolic Palace, accompanied by Parolin and Farrell.

Pope Leo XIV celebrated his inauguration Mass on 18 May 2025 at St. Peter's Square. He took canonical possession of the three other major basilicas on 20 May (Basilica of Saint Paul Outside the Walls) and 25 May (Archbasilica of Saint John Lateran and Basilica of St. Mary Major). He had his first general audience on 21 May. On 24 May, he met the Roman Curia and the Vatican City State employees. On 31 May, he conferred his first presbyteral ordination as bishop of Rome to the priests of the Diocese of Rome.

In early 2026, a book authored by spouses and Vatican correspondents Gerard O'Connell and Elisabetta Piqué titled The Election of Pope Leo XIV was released, saying that during conclave, a security breach was caused by a cardinal when he was spotted with a cellphone. According to the authors, security officials detected an active signal of a mobile phone connection as the clerics prepare for their first vote. The cardinal subsequently surrendered his phone after an elder cleric noticed. The book, however, did not name the cardinal. The event occurred inside the Sistine Chapel, where jamming devices are placed to prevent external communications. The Vatican press office neither confirmed nor denied the book's account of the incident.
