= Gaby Vallejo Canedo =

Bolivian writer (1941–2024)

- Born: 24 September 1941; Cochabamba, Bolivia
- Died: 20 January 2024 (aged 82)
- Education: Caro and Cuervo Institute
- Occupation: Writer
- Employer: University of San Simón
- Organization: Academia Boliviana de la Lengua

Gaby Vallejo Canedo (24 September 1941 – 20 January 2024) was a Bolivian writer. With over 40 published works, she dabbled in narrative genres such as novels and children's literature.

== Biography ==
Gaby Vallejo Canedo was born in Cochabamba on 24 September 1941. She studied at the Normal Catholic Institute of Cochabamba, obtaining the title of Professor of Literature, and earned a licentiate in Education Sciences at the University of San Simón. She completed a diploma in Latin American Literature at the Caro and Cuervo Institute in Bogotá.

Vallejo taught at the University of San Simón for 18 years.

Vallejo Canedo was a member of the Academia Boliviana de la Lengua from 27 July 2001, occupying its "H" chair.

Vallejo Canedo died from a heart attack on 20 January 2024, at the age of 82.

== Awards and distinctions ==
- First mention for the Erich Guttentag National Novel Award (1976)
- Erich Guttentag National Novel Award (1977)
- Hans Christian Andersen Honor Roll (Oslo, 1988)
- Named Meritorious Citizen of Cochabamba (1989)
- Dante Aliguieri Award, Accademia Cassentinese, for the Defense of Democracy Through Literature (Venice, 1991)
- Youth Literature Award, Ministry of Education (1996)
- National Prize for Thought and Culture (Sucre, 2001)
- IBBY-ASAHI Reading Promotion Award (2003)
- Golden Flag, granted by the National Senate (2008)
- Cultural Merit Medal (Pro Arte, 2010)
- International Prize of the Hispanic Literary and Cultural Institute (Paraguay, 2011)
- Literary career recognition from the University of San Simón (2013)
- Doctor honoris causa from the University of San Simón (2019)
- Named a Universal Ambassador of Culture by the Tarija Union of Writers and Artists and the UNESCO Latin American Writers' Union (2019)

== Works ==
Vallejo's narrative style has been defined as that of literary realism. Her novel ¡Hijo de opa! was adapted into the 1984 film Los Hermanos Cartagena, directed by Paolo Agazzi. In 2017, her literary output was analyzed by Willy Oscar Muñoz, and the result was published in the book La Narrativa Contestataria y Social de Gaby Vallejo Canedo (ISBN 9789997466273).

=== Novels ===
- Los vulnerables (1973)
- ¡Hijo de opa! (1977)
- Juvenal Nina (1981)
- Mi primo es mi papá (1989)
- La sierpe empieza en cola (1991)
- Con los ojos cerrados (1993)
- Encuentra tu ángel y tu demonio (1998), ISBN 9788483702413
- Amalia desde el espejo del Tiempo (2012), ISBN 9789995469405, biography of Amalia Villa de la Tapia
