= Darío Grandinetti =

Argentine actor (born 1959)

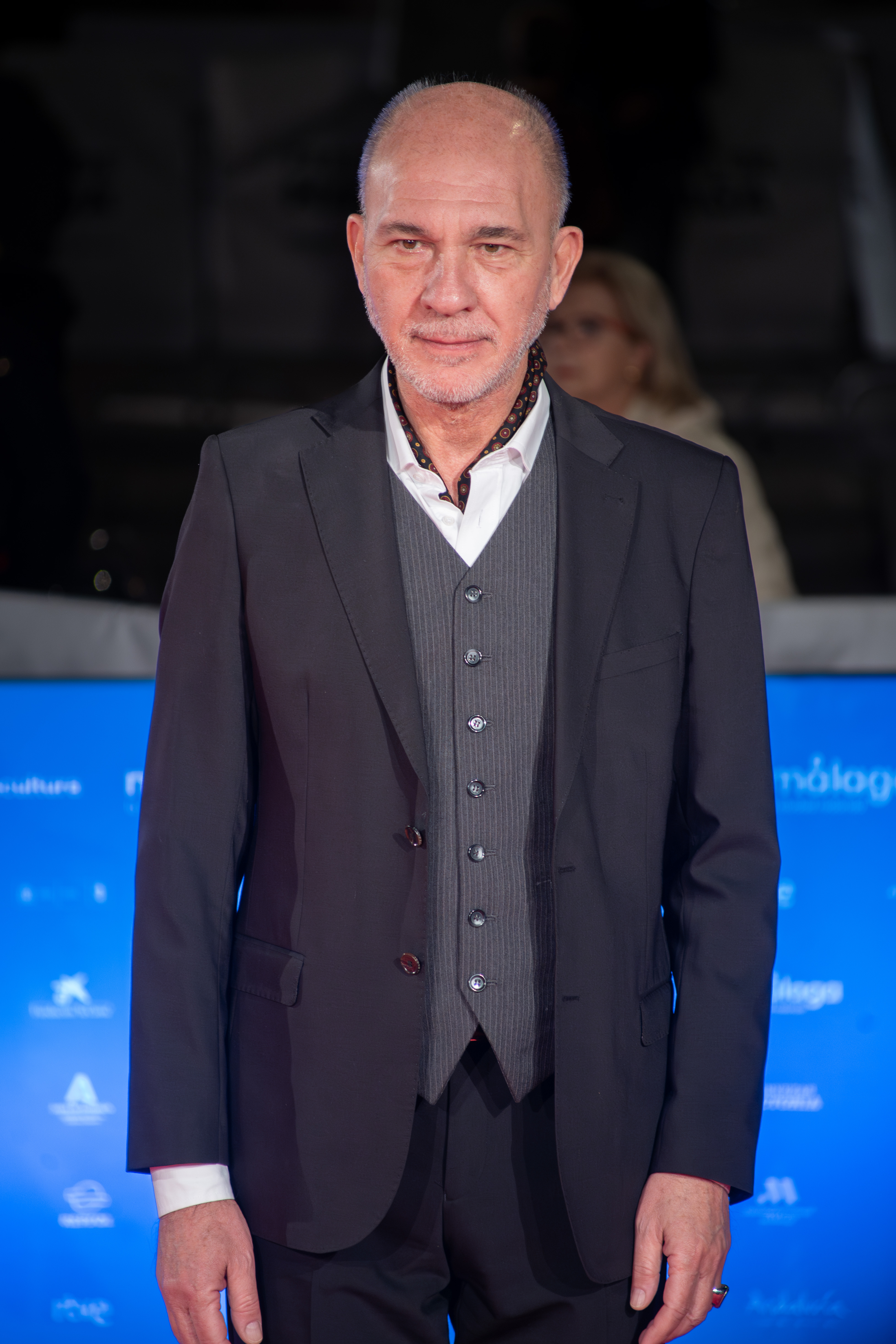
- Grandinetti in 2024
- Born: 5 March 1959 (age 67); Rosario, Santa Fe, Argentina
- Occupation: Actor
- Years active: 1976–present
- Partners: Eulalia Lombarte Llorca (m. 1989; div. 1992) Marisa Mondino (m. 1995; div. 2006) Pastora Vega (2016–2024)
- Children: 4 (1 deceased)

Darío Alejandro Grandinetti (born 5 March 1959) is an Argentine actor. He is known for his numerous roles in television, theater and film, where he participated in films by renowned directors such as Alejandro Doria, Pedro Almodóvar and Damián Szifron.

== Biography ==
Darío Grandinetti was born in the city of Rosario, Santa Fe, Argentina. His father worked in the Junta Nacional de Granos in streets of Mendoza and Sarmiento. When Darío Grandinetti was 17 years old he and his family moved to the small town of Las Rosas where they lived only one year and returned to Rosario. In Rosario, he played in the inferior teams of Newell's Old Boys football club. He began to work in the Junta Nacional de Granos as auxiliary and began studying theater. For reasons of work, he moved to Buenos Aires, Argentina.

== Career ==
Darío Grandinetti started as a television actor and slowly moved towards cinema. His filmography is mainly of Argentine production or co-productions with his country. His first work in a foreign production was the Bolivian El Día que murió el silencio of 1998, and has recently worked in a number of Spanish films, and also participated as guest in Spanish TV series. He is considered one of the most important Argentine actors. In 2012, he won an International Emmy Award for his role in Televisión por la Inclusión.

== Personal life ==
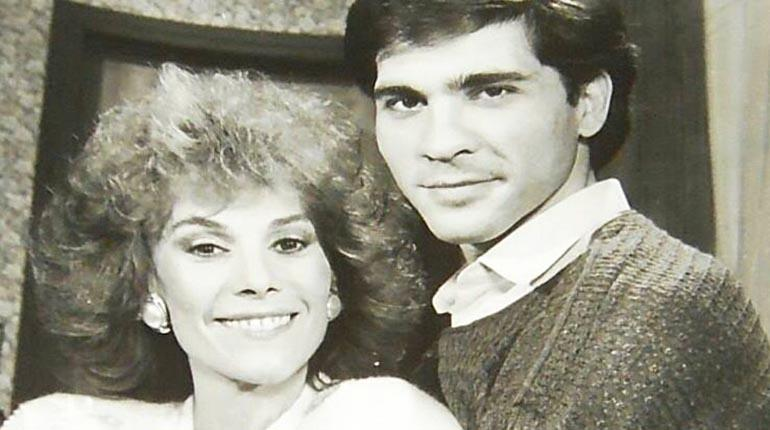
Silvia Montanari and Grandinetti

When he was 24, he had an affair with the 40 year old actor Silvia Montanari. She broke off the relationship saying later that it was because of their age difference.

In 1989, he formalized his relationship with Catalan artist Eulalia Lombarte Llorca with whom he had his first two children, María Eulalia and Juan. The couple ended their relationship in 1992 with much controversy and a legal battle for the possession of their children that ended up favoring Darío. In October 1993, he met ex-model and Argentine actress Marisa Mondino with whom he married in 1995 and had two daughters, Lucía (1996-1997), who died in 1997 of hydrocephalus, and Laura. The couple ended their relationship in 2006. Finally, after several rumors that linked them together, in 2016, Darío Grandinetti made official his relationship with actress Pastora Vega.

== Theater ==
Year	Title	Director
1976	Equus	
1981	El violinista en el tejado	
1982	Hijos del silencio	
1982-1983	Camino negro	
1984	Papi	
1985	Feliz año viejo	
1986	La jaula de las locas	
1986-1987	Los dueños del silencio	
1987-1990	Yepetto	
1993	Errare humanun est	
1995	Los lobos	
1996-1998	Los mosqueteros del rey	
1998-1999	Ya nadie recuerda a Federico Chopin	
2000	El cartero	
2000	Maratón dantesca	
2003	Juana de Arco en la hoguera	
2004	Teatro por la identidad	
2006-2007	Ella en mi cabeza	
2008-2010	Baraka	
2011-2012	Mineros	Javier Daulte
2013	Una relación pornográfica	Philippe Blasband
2014	Personitas	Javier Daulte
2014	Novecento	

== Television ==
Year	Title	Character	Channel
1980	Bianca		ATC
1980	Donde pueda quererte		Canal 11
1980	Señorita Andrea	Roque	ATC
1981	El ciclo de Guillermo Bredeston y Nora Cárpena		Canal 9
1985	Coraje mamá	Máximo	Canal 9
1986	Querido salvaje		Canal 11
1987	Ficciones		ATC
1990	Primera función	Yepetto	TVE
1990	Atreverse	Antonio	Telefé
1992	El oro y el barro	Professor	Canal 9
1993	Apasionada	Patricio Velasco	El Trece
1993	Zona de riesgo	Manager	El Trece
1994	Los machos		El Trece
1998	Los fiscales	Ignacio Castillo	Telefé
1999	La Argentina de Tato		El Trece
1999	Chiquititas	Juan Mazza	Telefé
2000-2002	Tiempo final		Telefé
2006	Algo habrán hecho por la historia argentina	Domingo Faustino Sarmiento	Telefé
2011	Tiempo de pensar	Gustavo	TV Pública
2011	Televisión por la inclusión	Mario	Canal 9
2013	Santos & Pecadores	Detective Fausto Cánovas	Canal 9
2014	En terapia	Carlos	TV Pública
2015-2016	La casa del mar	Inspector Jorge Pelazas	OnDirecTV
2018–present	El lobista	Elián	El Trece
2018–present	Hierro	Díaz	ARTE
2022	Santa Evita	Juan Domingo Perón	Star+
2023	La novia gitana	Miguel Vistas	

== Films ==
Year	Film	Character	Director	Country
1984	Darse cuenta	Juan	Alejandro Doria	Argentina
1985	Esperando la carroza	Cacho	Alejandro Doria	Argentina
1985	La Búsqueda	The mute	Juan Carlos Desanzo	Argentina
1986	Les Longs manteaux	Solder Gaitán	Gilles Béhat	Argentina-France
1986	Seguridad personal		Aníbal Di Salvo	Argentina
1988	Las Puertitas del señor López		Alberto Fischerman	Argentina
1990	Cien veces no debo	Jorge	Alejandro Doria	Argentina
1990	La Pandilla aventurera	Sailor	Miguel Torrado	Argentina
1992	El lado oscuro del corazón	Oliverio	Eliseo Subiela	Argentina-Canada
1994	La Balada de Donna Helena	Car Thief	Fito Páez	Argentina
1995	Las Cosas del querer: Segunda parte	Tullio	Jaime Chávarri	Argentina-Spain
1995	No te mueras sin decirme adónde vas	Leopoldo	Eliseo Subiela	Argentina
1996	El Dedo en la llaga	Tolosa	Alberto Lecchi	Argentina-Spain
1996	Despabílate amor	Ernesto	Eliseo Subiela	Argentina
1997	Sus ojos se cerraron y el mundo sigue andando	Carlos Gardel/Renzo Franchi	Jaime Chávarri	Argentina-Spain
1997	La casa de Tourneur		Jorge Caterbona	Argentina
1998	El Día que Murió el Silencio	Abelardo	Paolo Agazzi	Bolivia
1999	El Amateur	Municipal Official	Juan Bautista Stagnaro	Argentina
1999	Operación Fangio	Juan Manuel Fangio	Alberto Lecchi	Argentina-Spain-Cuba
2001	El lado oscuro del corazón 2	Oliverio	Eliseo Subiela	Argentina-Spain
2002	Hable con ella	Marco Zuluaga	Pedro Almodóvar	Spain
2003	Ilusión de movimiento	Rafael	Héctor Molina	Argentina
2003	Tiempo de tormenta (Stormy Weather)	Oscar	Pedro Olea	Spain
2003	Killing Words	Ramón Díaz	Laura Mañá	Spain
2003	El juego de Arcibel	Arcibel Alegría	Alberto Lecchi	Argentina
2003	Ciudad del sol	Luis	Carlos Galettini	Argentina
2004	El año del diluvio	Aixelá	Jaime Chávarri	France-Spain-Italy
2004	Próxima salida	Carlos Velmar	Nicolás Tuozzo	Argentina
2005	Segundo asalto (Round Two)	Vidal	Daniel Cebrián	Spain
2005	El buen destino		Leonor Benedetto	Argentina
2007	La carta esférica		Imanol Uribe	Spain
2007	¿De quién es el portaligas?	Norman	Fito Páez	Argentina
2007	El frasco	Pérez	Alberto Lecchi	Argentina
2007	Quiéreme	Pancho	Beda Docampo Feijóo	Argentina-Spain
2007	La peli	Diego	Gustavo Postiglione	Argentina-Uruguay
2008	Horizontal/Vertical	Police	Nicolás Tuozzo	Argentina
2009	Haroldo Conti, homo viator	Haroldo Conti	Miguel Mato	Argentina
2009	Días de mayo	Laura's father	Gustavo Postiglione	Argentina
2010	Carne de neón	Chino	Paco Cabezas	Argentina-Spain
2013	Matrimonio	Esteban	Carlos María Jaureguialzo	Argentina
2014	Inevitable	Fabián	Jorge Algora	Argentina-Spain
2014	Relatos salvajes	Salgado	Damián Szifron	Argentina-Spain
2015	Francis: Pray for me	Jorge Bergoglio	Beda Docampo Feijóo	Argentina-Spain
2016	Julieta	Lorenzo Gentile	Pedro Almodóvar	Spain
2016	Horas			Argentina
2018	The Queen of Fear		Valeria Bertuccelli; Fabiana Tiscornia	Argentina-Denmark
2018	El pacto	Alex	David Victori	Spain
2018	Rojo	Claudio Moran	Benjamín Naishtat	Argentina
2023	Empieza el baile	Carlos	Marina Seresesky	Argentina-Spain
2024	Nina	Pedro	Andrea Jaurrieta	Spain
2024	Dismantling an Elephant	Félix	Aitor Echeverría	Spain-France
2025	Um Lobo Entre os Cisnes	Dino Carrera	Marcos Schechtman	Brazil

== TV Programs ==
Year	Title	Channel	Notes
2008	Historia del petróleo en la Argentina	Encuentro	TV Host

== Awards ==
Year	Award	Category	Program	Result
1992	Havana Film Festival	El Lado oscuro del corazón	Best Actor	Winner
1993	Gramado Film Festival	El Lado oscuro del corazón	Best Actor	Winner
1999	Cartagena Film Festival	El Día que Murió el Silencio	Best Actor	Winner
1999	Silver Condor Awards	Sus ojos se cerraron y el mundo sigue andando	Best Actor	Winner
2001	Konex Award		Best Actor	Winner
2004	Fantasporto	Killing Words	Best Actor	Winner
2012	International Emmy Award	Televisión por la inclusión	Best Actor	Winner
