= Jordi Galceran =

Jordi Galceran Ferrer
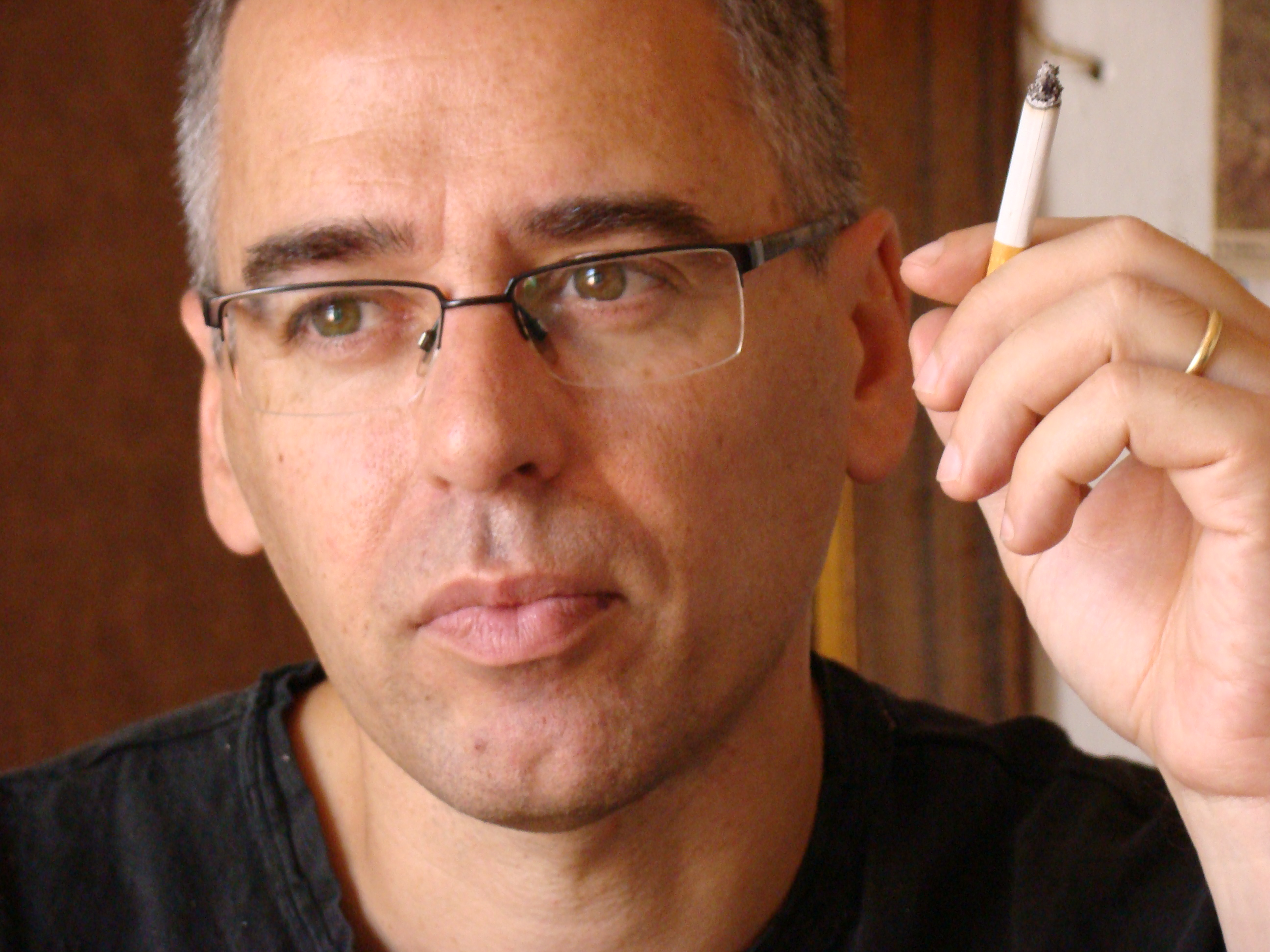
- Born: Jordi Galceran Ferrer; 5 March 1964 (age 62); Barcelona, Catalonia, Spain
- Education: University of Barcelona
- Occupation: Playwright
- Writing career
- Language: Spanish, Catalan
- Notable work: El mètode Grönholm

Jordi Galceran Ferrer (Catalan pronunciation: [ˈʒɔɾði ɣəlsəˈɾan]; born March 5, 1964) is a Catalan playwright, screenwriter and translator, known internationally for his play El mètode Grönholm (The Grönholm Method, 2003). He writes in Catalan.

== Education ==
Galceran studied Catalan Philology at the University of Barcelona and started to write theatrical plays in 1988.

== Career ==
In 1995, with Paraules encadenades (Words in Chains) he won the 20th Born Theatre Award, and in 1996, the Critic's Award Serra d'Or for best work in the Catalan language. His play Dakota (1995) received the Ignasi Iglesias award.

Killing Words, a 2003 film directed by Laura Mañá, is based on Paraules encadenades. Fragile, directed by Jaume Balagueró, is also based on a script co-authored by Galceran, while The Method, directed by Marcelo Piñeyro, is a film adaptation of The Grönholm Method.

== Works ==
- 1994. Surf. Premiere at the Sala Villarroel in Barcelona.
- 1995. Paraules encadenades (Words in Chains)
- 1996. Dakota. Premiere at the Poliorama Theatre.
- 1998. Fuita (Escape). Premiere at the Josep Maria de Sagarra theatre in Santa Coloma de Gramenet; in Barcelona, at the Teatre Principal.
- 2002. Gaudí (a musical), in collaboration with Albert Guinovart
- 2003. El mètode Grönholm (The Grönholm method), premiere at the Teatre Nacional de Catalunya; later at the Poliorama.
- 2005. Carnaval. Premiere at the teatre Borràs in Barcelona.
- 2007. Cancun. Premiere at the teatre Borràs in Barcelona.
- 2013. El crèdit. Premiere at the Villarroel theatre in Barcelona.

== Adaptations ==
- 2009. The Inspector-General by Nikolay Gogol, premiere at the Teatre Nacional de Catalunya.
