= Gerard O'Connell =

Gerard O'Connell may refer to:

- Gerard O'Connell (journalist), Irish journalist in the United States
- Gerard O'Connell, member of the electronic band Ritual
