= Élisabeth Margoni =

French actress

- Born: Mantes-la-Jolie, France
- Occupation: Actress
- Years active: 1968-present

Élisabeth Margoni is a French actress.

== Theatre ==
| Year | Title | Author | Director | Notes |
|---|---|---|---|---|
| 1968 | L'Amour propre | Marc Camoletti | Marc Camoletti | |
| 1969 | L'Ascenseur électrique | Julien Vartet | Roland Piétri | |
| 1971 | Deux Imbéciles heureux | Michel André | Michel André | |
| 1973-74 | Le Médecin malgré lui | Molière | Jean-Louis Thamin | |
| 1976 | Isaac et la sage femme | Victor Haïm | Étienne Bierry | |
| 1977 | Quoat-Quoat | Jacques Audiberti | Georges Vitaly | |
| 1979 | The Bear | Anton Chekhov | Jean-Luc Moreau | |
| 1979 | La Fugue | Francis Lacombrade & Bernard Broca | Jean-Claude Brialy | |
| 1981 | Le Nombril | Jean Anouilh | Jean Anouilh & Roland Piétri | |
| 1988 | Lend Me a Tenor | Ken Ludwig | Jean-Luc Moreau | |
| 1989 | Tempo | Richard Harris | Philippe Ogouz | |
| 1991 | Le Prête-nom | John Chapman | Jean-Luc Moreau | |
| 2004-06 | Sortie de scène | Nicolas Bedos | Daniel Benoin | Nominated - Molière Award for Best Supporting Actress |

== Filmography ==
| Year | Title | Role | Director | Notes |
|---|---|---|---|---|
| 1968 | Au théâtre ce soir | Henriette | Pierre Sabbagh | TV series (1 episode) |
| 1976 | Body of My Enemy | Karine Dupart | Henri Verneuil | |
| 1977 | Pardon Mon Affaire, Too! | Daisy | Yves Robert | |
| 1977 | Madame Rosa | | Moshé Mizrahi | |
| 1977 | Les Borgia ou le sang doré | Sancia | Alain Dhénaut | TV movie |
| 1977 | Un juge, un flic | Julia | Denys de La Patellière | TV series (1 episode) |
| 1978 | Les hommes de Rose | Ottavia | Maurice Cloche | TV series (1 episode) |
| 1978 | Madame le juge | Camille | Claude Barma | TV series (1 episode) |
| 1979 | The Adolescent | Mademoiselle Gaby | Jeanne Moreau | |
| 1979 | Pierrette | Bathilde | Guy Jorré | TV movie |
| 1980 | Extérieur, nuit | Véronique | Jacques Bral | |
| 1980 | Georges Dandin | Claudine | Yves-André Hubert | TV movie |
| 1980 | Les incorrigibles | | Abder Isker | TV mini-series |
| 1980 | L'inspecteur mène l'enquête | | Eddy Naka | TV series (1 episode) |
| 1981 | The Professional | Jeanne Beaumont | Georges Lautner | |
| 1981 | Celles qu'on n'a pas eues | Mathilde | Pascal Thomas | |
| 1981 | Cinq-Mars | Marion Delorme | Jean-Claude Brialy | TV movie |
| 1981 | Susi | Anna | Michael Pfleghar | TV mini-series |
| 1982 | Le bourgeois gentilhomme | Nicole | Roger Coggio | |
| 1982 | Messieurs les jurés | Pascale Baudières | André Michel | TV series (1 episode) |
| 1983 | Par ordre du Roy | Princess Jabirovska | Michel Mitrani | TV movie |
| 1983 | Les brigades du Tigre | Maya | Victor Vicas | TV series (1 episode) |
| 1984 | Emportez-la avec vous | Véronique | Jean Sagols | TV movie |
| 1984 | Opération O.P.E.N. | Mathilde | François Dupont-Midi | TV series (1 episode) |
| 1984 | Emmenez-moi au théâtre | Leda | Claude Barma | TV series (1 episode) |
| 1984 | Les enquêtes du commissaire Maigret | Alice / Aline | Georges Ferraro & Alain Boudet | TV series (2 episodes) |
| 1985 | La baston | Vanessa | Jean-Claude Missiaen | |
| 1986 | Le coeur du voyage | Léontine | François Leterrier | TV movie |
| 1986 | À nous les beaux dimanches | Claudia | Robert Mazoyer | TV movie |
| 1988 | Les amies de Miami | Gina | Philippe Galardi | TV series (1 episode) |
| 1989 | My Best Pals | Monique | Jean-Marie Poiré | |
| 1992 | Secret de famille | Julia | Hervé Baslé | TV mini-series |
| 1992 | Aldo tous risques | Isabella | Michel Wyn | TV series (1 episode) |
| 1993 | Les maîtres du pain | Sylvana | Hervé Baslé | TV mini-series |
| 1993 | Clovis | Rosemonde Burle | François Leterrier | TV series (1 episode) |
| 1995 | The Horseman on the Roof | The farmer's wife | Jean-Paul Rappeneau | |
| 1995 | L'histoire du samedi | Mariette Savigneau | Alain Schwartzstein | TV series (1 episode) |
| 1996 | Antoine | Madame Bombel | Jérôme Foulon | TV movie |
| 1997 | Alors voilà, | Vivianne | Michel Piccoli | |
| 1998 | The Visitors II: The Corridors of Time | Madame Lumeau-Péricard | Jean-Marie Poiré | |
| 1998 | Une semaine au salon | Janine | Dominique Baron | TV movie |
| 1998 | Dossier : disparus | Madame Tisault | Antoine Lorenzi | TV series (1 episode) |
| 1998 | Commandant Nerval | Commissioner Rosemonde | Arnaud Sélignac | TV series (1 episode) |
| 1999 | Singerie | Macha Grouchenka | Claire Aziza | Short |
| 1999 | Julie Lescaut | Seimier | Pascale Dallet | TV series (1 episode) |
| 1999 | P.J. | Madame Hermet | Gérard Vergez | TV series (1 episode) |
| 2000 | Compassionate Sex | Lolita | Laura Mañá | |
| 2000 | Salsa | Madame de Stael | Joyce Buñuel | |
| 2000 | La vocation d'Adrienne | Madame Sébillot | Joël Santoni | TV series (1 episode) |
| 2000 | Docteur Sylvestre | Madame Duperoy | Maurice Frydland | TV series (1 episode) |
| 2001 | L'engrenage | Mario's mother | Frank Nicotra | |
| 2001 | La crim' | Sylvie Nivelle | Denis Amar | TV series (1 episode) |
| 2002 | The Code | Evelyne | Manuel Boursinhac | |
| 2002 | Les filles du calendrier | Françoise | Philippe Venault & Jean-Pierre Vergne | TV movie |
| 2002 | Josephine, Guardian Angel | Claire Mangin | Laurent Dussaux | TV series (1 episode) |
| 2003 | Love Actually | Eleonore | Richard Curtis | |
| 2004 | San-Antonio | The First Lady | Frédéric Auburtin | |
| 2004 | Les filles du calendrier sur scène | Françoise | Jean-Pierre Vergne | TV movie |
| 2004 | Avocats & associés | Catherine Fageol | Christophe Barraud | TV series (1 episode) |
| 2005 | C'est pas tout à fait la vie dont j'avais rêvé | The mistress | Michel Piccoli | |
| 2005 | Le cocon - Débuts à l'hôpital | Solange Ferber | Pascale Dallet | TV mini-series |
| 2006 | Qui m'aime me suive | Monique | Benoît Cohen | |
| 2006 | Jeanne Poisson, Marquise de Pompadour | Madame Poisson | Robin Davis | TV movie |
| 2006 | La tempête | Louise | Bertrand Arthuys | TV movie |
| 2007 | Nos enfants chéris - la série | Mother Martin | Benoît Cohen | TV series (1 episode) |
| 2008 | Le sanglot des anges | Suzy | Jacques Otmezguine | TV mini-series |
| 2010 | Empreintes criminelles | Madame Adélaïde | Christian Bonnet | TV series (1 episode) |
| 2011 | Bienvenue à bord | Gabriella | Éric Lavaine | |
| 2011 | Le grand restaurant II | The amnesic's wife | Gérard Pullicino | TV movie |
| 2011 | Hard | Nadine | Cathy Verney | TV series (1 episode) |
| 2013 | Tiger Lily, quatre femmes dans la vie | Dolores | Benoît Cohen | TV mini-series |
| 2014 | Le juge est une femme | Mattéo's mother | Akim Isker | TV series (1 episode) |
