= Diego Mignone =

Ecuadorian actor

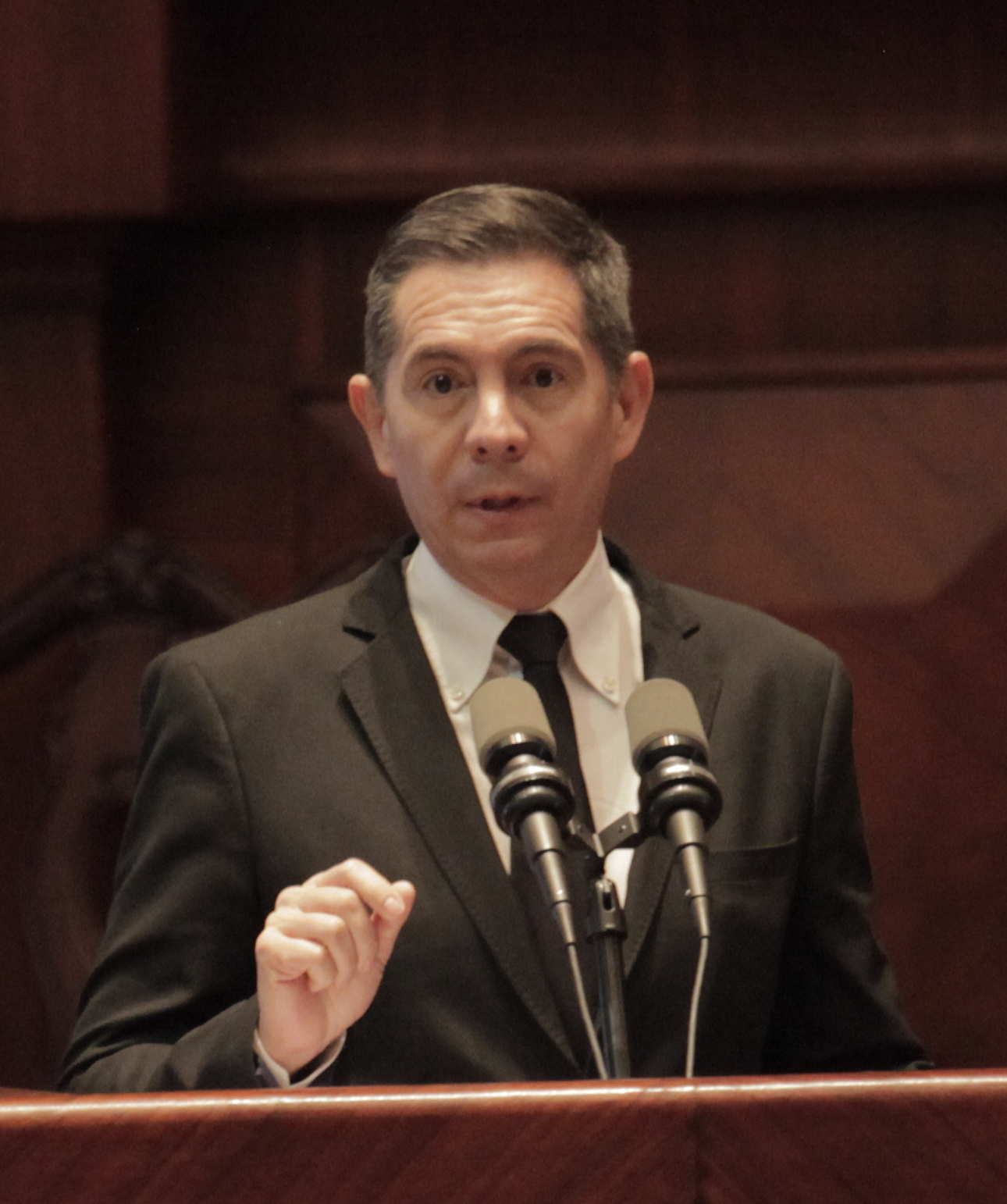
- Mignone in 2015
- Born: 1967 (age 58–59); Quito, Ecuador
- Education: Pontifical Catholic University of Ecuador
- Occupations: Actor; producer; LGBTQ activist

Diego Cornejo Mignone (Quito, b. 1967), known in the artistic world as Diego Mignone, is an Ecuadorian LGBT actor, producer, and activist. He has acted in television series such as La Reina del Sur (2011) and in films including Translucid (2016) and La mala noche (2019). He is also one of the founders of the Union of Audiovisual Artists and Authors of Ecuador (UNIARTE-Collective Management Society) of the Association of Audiovisual Actors of Ecuador (Uniactores).

In the field of activism, he was the creator of the Tolerancia Group, one of the LGBT groups that worked to achieve the decriminalization of homosexuality in Ecuador. The group succeeded in its goal on 25 November 1997, when the Constitutional Tribunal declared that the law that criminalized same-sex relationships was unconstitutional.

== Trajectory ==
=== Artistic career ===
He studied acting at the Inicine Institute in the early 2000s, then traveled to Colombia to continue specializing at the Charlotte Institute. Mignone later decided to continue his acting career in Spain, where he acted in productions such as Cazadores de hombres (2008), which aired on Antena 3; Yo soy Bea, where he played the character of psychologist Diego de la Vega; and in an episode of the series Hospital Central. He also acted in the films Mileuristas (2008), The Sindone (2010), and El archivo Akásico (2012).

In 2010, he traveled to Colombia, where he was contacted by the producers of La Reina del Sur to work on the series. In it, he played the role of Cucho Malaspina, a homosexual journalist who enters the life of the protagonist, Teresa Mendoza, when she suffers an attack. After discovering that Mendoza controlled an international drug trafficking business, Malaspina decides to make her famous and is the one who baptizes her as "the queen of the south." The success of the series was the catalyst that allowed Mignone to make himself known as an actor in his native country and internationalize his career.

Mignone was one of the founders of the Association of Audiovisual Actors of Ecuador (Uniactores) and the Union of Audiovisual Artists of Ecuador (Uniartes), who seek to improve the working conditions of Ecuadorian acting professionals and audiovisual artists. He was also president of both organizations. Due to this position, in 2015, he participated in the discussions in the National Assembly of Ecuador to provide observations to the draft Organic Code of the Social Economy of Knowledge, which the legislature was debating at that time.

In later years, he acted in films such as Translúcido (2016), Agujero negro (2018) and La mala noche (2019).

=== LGBT Activism and Tolerancia Group ===
Mignone entered activism for LGBT rights during a stay in Holland, a country to which he traveled to do a master's degree and where he approached the LGBT organization COC Nederland, since Mignone is homosexual.

Shortly after his return to Ecuador, a police raid on Abanicos, an LGBT bar in Cuenca, occurred in June 1997, and detainees suffered a series of abuses by the authorities. In response, Mignone wrote an anonymous letter in favor of LGBT people published by the newspaper El Comercio. Mignone signed the letter as "Tolerance Group", a name he created at the time of writing.

Alexis Ponce, a member of the Permanent Assembly of Human Rights, contacted Mignone at the email from which he had sent the letter. Mignone then gathered several of his LGBT friends and, under the name of Grupo Tolerancia, they joined the campaign to achieve the decriminalization of homosexuality in Ecuador, which other LGBT organizations were promoting after the Abanicos bar raid.

Among the members of Tolerancia were Roberto Izurieta and Milagros Torres, the only lesbian woman visible in the decriminalization process. Tolerancia members helped in the signature collection process, which was a requirement to impose a lawsuit against the article in the Criminal Code that criminalized homosexual people. Grupo Tolerancia carried out the collection mainly in nightclubs, both heterosexual and LGBT.

Once the lawsuit was filed in the Constitutional Tribunal, under the name Case No. 111-97-TC, members of the Tolerancia Group attended the Court together with members of the Fedaeps foundation, where they met with members of the Court to talk to them about the importance of approving the legal change and educating them about sexual diversity.

On 25 November 1997, the Constitutional Tribunal ruled in favor of the plaintiffs and declared the first paragraph of article 516 of the Criminal Code unconstitutional. This act legalized homosexuality in Ecuador. After the achievement, the members of the Tolerancia Group moved away from activism.

== Filmography ==
=== Movies ===
- Mileuristas (2008)
- The Sindone (2010)
- El archivo Akásico (2012)
- Translúcido (2016)
- Agujero negro (2018)
- La mala noche (2019)

=== Television programs ===
- La Reina del Sur (2011)

== Sources ==
- Lobato, Fredy, ed. (2023). Cuéntame una historia. Despenalización de la homosexualidad en Ecuador (in Spanish). Fundación Ecuatoriana Equidad. ISBN 978-9942-7154-0-1.
