= Sena/Quina, la inmortalidad del cangrejo =

- Directed by: Paolo Agazzi
- Written by: Juan Pablo Piñeiro
- Produced by: Paolo Agazzi, Ute Gumz & Ramiro Fierro
- Starring: Cristian Mercado; Rosendo Paz; José Véliz; Soledad Ardaya
- Cinematography: Guillermo Medrano
- Edited by: Mela Márquez
- Release date: 2005
- Country: Bolivia
- Language: Spanish

Sena/Quina, la inmortalidad del cangrejo is a film written and directed by Paolo Agazzi.

== Synopsis ==
The story of two minor con artists, who survive by deceiving others with small and ingenious scams. Their lives take an unexpected turn when attempting to deceive another victim who turns out to be more cunning than they are.

== Cast ==
- Cristian Mercado as Falso Conejo
- Rosendo Paz as Miami Vaca
- José Véliz as Justo Pascual
- Soledad Ardaya as Alondra
