= Killing Words =

- Spanish: Palabras encadenadas
- Directed by: Laura Mañá
- Written by: Laura Mañá; Jordi Galcerán; Fernando de Felipe
- Produced by: Carlos Fernández; Julio Fernández; Teresa Gefaell
- Starring: Darío Grandinetti; Goya Toledo; Fernando Guillén; Eric Bonicatto
- Cinematography: Xavi Giménez
- Edited by: Luis De La Madrid
- Music by: Francesc Gener
- Release date: 30 April 2003
- Running time: 89 minutes
- Country: Spain
- Language: Spanish

Killing Words (Spanish: Palabras encadenadas) is a Spanish psychological thriller co-written and directed by Laura Mañá which stars Darío Grandinetti and Goya Toledo.

== Plot ==
Ramón, a respected philosophy professor, has kidnapped Laura, a psychiatrist, and claims to be a serial killer. While taping their conversation in his basement, he forces Laura to play word games and psychoanalyze him for her freedom. Intercut with this plotline, Ramon is interrogated by the police for Laura's disappearance. As both conversations progress, it is revealed that Laura is Ramón's ex-wife, who accused him of spousal abuse during their divorce hearings.

Ramón toys with Laura, sometimes changing his stories to appear harmless, then reaffirming his murderous intentions. At one point, he claims that he has lied about his murders in order to force her to admit that her accusations of abuse were false. He continues to express romantic interest in her, and Laura offers to have sex with him for her freedom, but Ramón cannot perform. Ultimately Laura admits to lying during their divorce hearings, but only to save him the humiliation of the truth: that she has discovered his affairs with male students.

During the interview, Ramón admits that he kidnapped Laura in order to scare a confession from her, but his story does not always match up with the events portrayed. He claims that he and his wife are engaging in a cat-and-mouse game, which she has won. When police secretly inspect his home, they discover a doctored telephone message that Ramón has made from the recordings in his basement. The message makes it appear that Laura has faked her death in order to frame Ramón for her murder. The police believe the recording and release Ramón.

When Ramón returns home, he watches a video of the final chapter in his conversation with Laura. On the video, Ramón admits to his affairs with male students and fatally stabs Laura. He fondles Laura's body and begins undressing her before turning off the camera.

== Cast ==
- Darío Grandinetti as Ramón
- Goya Toledo as Laura
- Fernando Guillén as Comisario Espinosa
- Eric Bonicatto as Inspector Sánchez

=== Festivals ===
Listed chronologically:

- Cannes Film Festival
- Fantasy Filmfest
- Muestra Cinematográfica de Preestrenos de España y Francia
- Copenhagen International Film Festival
- Dead by Dawn Horror Film Festival

=== Awards and nominations ===
- Amsterdam Fantastic Film Festival
  - Grand Prize of European Fantasy Film in Gold - Nominated
- Fant-Asia Film Festival
  - AQCC Award - Mention - Won
- Fantasporto
  - Grand Prize of European Fantasy Film in Silver - Won
  - International Fantasy Film Award - Won
  - International Fantasy Film Special Jury Award - Won
  - International Fantasy Film Award - Nominated
- Málaga Spanish Film Festival
  - Silver Biznaga - Won
  - Golden Biznaga - Nominated

== See also ==
- List of Spanish films of 2003
