= The Southern House =

- Theatrical release poster
- Directed by: Carina Oroza Daroca; Ramiro Fierro
- Written by: Carina Oroza Daroca
- Produced by: Carina Oroza Daroca
- Starring: Grisel Quiroga
- Cinematography: Ernesto Fernández Tellería
- Edited by: Ramiro Fierro
- Music by: Alejandro Rivas
- Production company: Kyma Films
- Distributed by: Distrito Pacífico (Colombia)
- Release dates: November 21, 2024 (Colombia); February 6, 2025 (Bolivia)
- Running time: 88 minutes
- Countries: Bolivia; Colombia
- Language: Spanish

The Southern House (Spanish: La casa del sur) is a 2024 drama film directed by Carina Oroza Daroca and Ramiro Fierro in their directorial debut. A co-production between Bolivia and Colombia, the film stars Grisel Quiroga accompanied by Piti Campos, Arwen Delaine, Alejandra Lanza, Cristian Mercado and David Mondacca.

It was selected as the Bolivian entry for the Best International Feature Film at the 98th Academy Awards, but it was not nominated.

== Synopsis ==
After the death of her aunt Lu, Ana returns to Bolivia after 25 years to sell the family home. It's a trip she didn't want to take, due to her and her family's painful past during the last military dictatorship, which forced her into exile as a child. But the return allows her to discover truths she never knew and to reconnect with herself and her home.

== Cast ==
- Grisel Quiroga
- Piti Campos
- Arwen Delaine
- Alejandra Lanza
- Cristian Mercado
- David Mondacca

== Production ==
Principal photography began in February 2019 in Concepción, Tarija.

== Release ==
The film premiered on November 21, 2024, in Colombian theaters, and on February 6, 2025, in Bolivian theaters.

== See also ==
- List of submissions to the 98th Academy Awards for Best International Feature Film
- List of Bolivian submissions for the Academy Award for Best International Feature Film
