= Compassionate Sex =

- Spanish: Sexo por compasión
- Directed by: Laura Mañá
- Written by: Laura Mañá
- Produced by: Julio Fernández; Miguel Torrente
- Starring: Élisabeth Margoni; Álex Angulo; Pilar Bardem; Juan Carlos Colombo; Mariola Fuentes; Carmen Salinas; Leticia Huijara; Damián Alcázar; José Sancho
- Cinematography: Henner Hofmann
- Music by: Francesc Gener
- Release dates: 30 June 2000 (Spain); 5 February 2003 (Mexico)
- Running time: 109 minutes
- Countries: Spain; Mexico
- Language: Spanish

Compassionate Sex (Spanish: Sexo por compasión) is a 2000 Spanish-Mexican comedy film directed by Laura Mañá.

== Cast ==
- Élisabeth Margoni as Lolita
- Álex Angulo as Pepe
- Pilar Bardem as Berta
- Juan Carlos Colombo as Padre Anselmo
- Carmen Salinas as La madame
- Mariola Fuentes as Floren
- Leticia Huijara as Leocadia
- Damián Alcázar as Hombre virgen

== Release ==
The film screened at the Málaga Film Festival, winning the Best Film and the People's Choice awards. Due to distribution complications, the Mexican theatrical release date was delayed to 5 February 2003.

== See also ==
- List of Spanish films of 2000
- List of Mexican films of 2003
