= Catholic Encyclopedia =

English-language encyclopedia on Catholicism

- Cover of the 1913 Catholic Encyclopedia, Volume 1
- Publisher: Robert Appleton Company
- Publication date: 1907
- Pages: 860
- Followed by: New Catholic Encyclopedia
- Text: Catholic Encyclopedia at Wikisource

The Catholic Encyclopedia: An International Work of Reference on the Constitution, Doctrine, Discipline, and History of the Catholic Church, also referred to as the Old Catholic Encyclopedia and the Original Catholic Encyclopedia, is an English-language encyclopedia about Roman Catholicism, published in the United States. It was designed "to give its readers full and authoritative information on the entire cycle of Catholic interests, action and doctrine".

The first volume of the Catholic Encyclopedia appeared in March 1907 and the last three volumes appeared in 1912, followed by a master index volume in 1914 and later supplementary volumes. Its successor, the New Catholic Encyclopedia, was first published by the Catholic University of America in 1967.

The Catholic Encyclopedia was published by the Robert Appleton Company (RAC) in New York City. RAC was a publishing company incorporated in February 1905 for the express purpose of publishing the encyclopedia. The five members of the encyclopedia's editorial board also served as the RAC directors. In 1912, the company changed its name to The Encyclopedia Press. Publication of the encyclopedia's volumes was the sole business conducted by Encyclopedia Press during the project's lifetime.

== Purpose ==
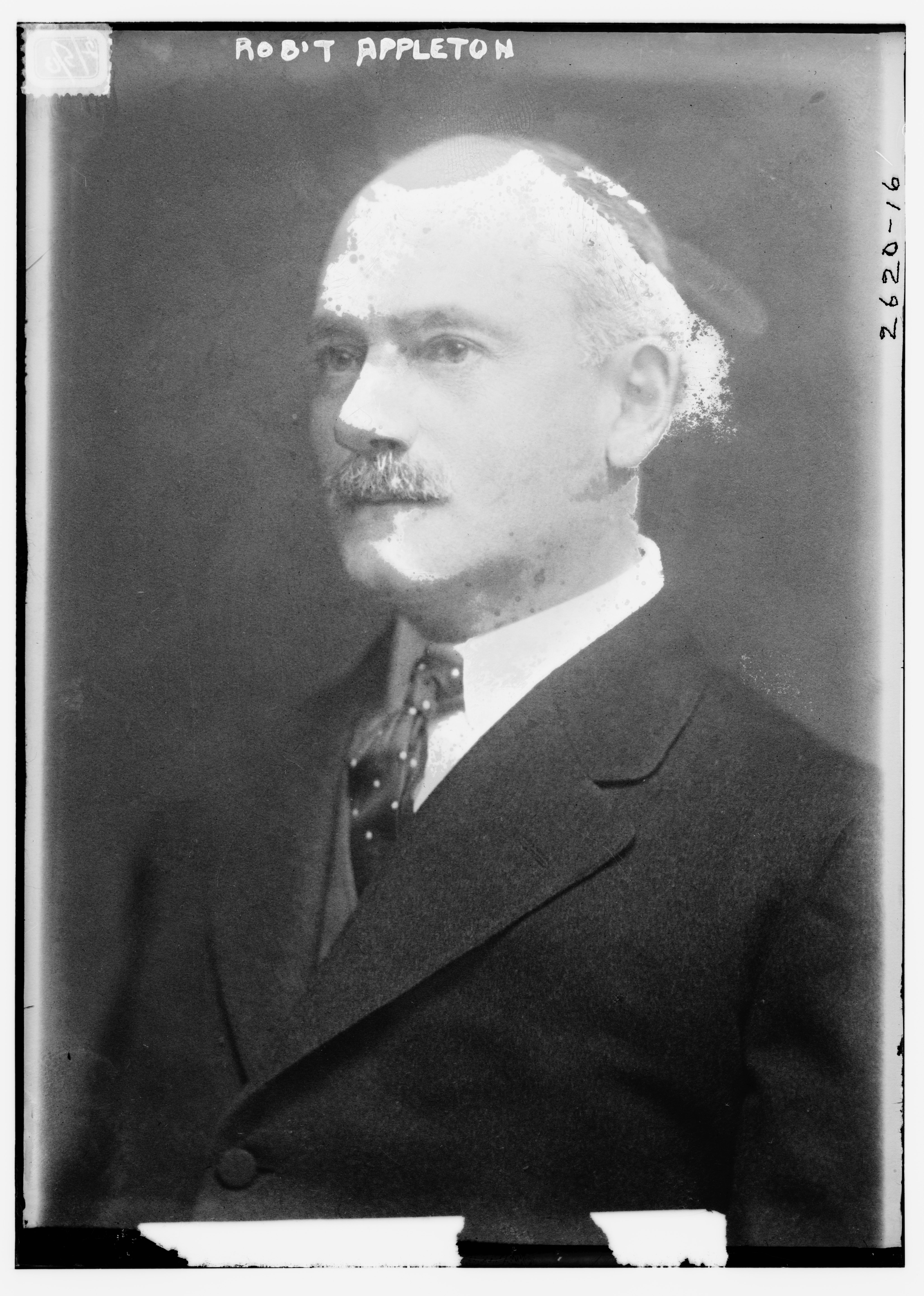
Robert Appleton

The Catholic Encyclopedia was designed to serve Roman Catholics in North America and other readers in the Anglophone world who wanted information about the Church from the Roman Catholic point of view. The encyclopedia records the accomplishments of Roman Catholics and others in nearly all intellectual and professional pursuits, including the arts, education, and science. While more limited in focus than other general encyclopedias, it was far broader in scope than previous efforts at comprehensive Roman Catholic encyclopedias, which covered only internal Church affairs.

The Catholic Encyclopedia offers in-depth portrayals of historical and philosophical ideas, persons, and events, from a Roman Catholic perspective, including issues that divide Roman Catholicism from Protestantism and other religious communities. Since the encyclopedia was first published starting in 1907 and has never been updated (versus the New Catholic Encyclopedia), many of its entries may be out of date either with respect to the wider culture or to the Roman Catholic ecclesiastical world. In particular, it predates the creation of the Vatican City State (1929) and the Second Vatican Council (1962–1965), which introduced changes to Roman Catholic doctrine and practices.

== History ==
The writing of the Catholic Encyclopedia began in 1905, under the supervision of five editors:

- Charles G. Herbermann, professor of Latin and librarian of the College of the City of New York
- Reverend Edward A. Pace, professor of philosophy at the Catholic University of America in Washington, D.C.
- Condé B. Pallen, editor and poet
- Reverend Thomas J. Shahan, professor of Church history at the Catholic University of America
- Thomas F. Woodlock, a member of the board of directors for the project and contributor of several articles within it
- Reverend John J. Wynne, S.J., editor of the Messenger of the Sacred Heart periodical

RAC published the first edition of the Catholic Encyclopedia. It released the volumes sequentially, the first two in 1907 and the last three in 1912:

| Volume | Entries | Year first pub. | Chief editor |
|---|---|---|---|
| 1 | Aachen–Assize | 1907 | Charles George Herbermann |
| 2 | Assize–Brownr | 1907 | Charles George Herbermann |
| 3 | Brow–Clancy | 1908 | Charles George Herbermann |
| 4 | Cland–Diocesan | 1908 | Charles George Herbermann |
| 5 | Diocese–Fathers | 1909 | Charles George Herbermann |
| 6 | Fathers–Gregory | 1909 | Charles George Herbermann |
| 7 | Gregory–Infallibility | 1910 | Charles George Herbermann |
| 8 | Infamy–Lapparent | 1910 | Charles George Herbermann |
| 9 | Laprade–Mass | 1910 | Charles George Herbermann |
| 10 | Mass–Newman | 1911 | Charles George Herbermann |
| 11 | New Mexico–Philip | 1911 | Charles George Herbermann |
| 12 | Philip–Revalidation | 1911 | Charles George Herbermann |
| 13 | Revelation–Simon Stock | 1912 | Charles George Herbermann |
| 14 | Simony–Tournely | 1912 | Charles George Herbermann |
| 15 | Tournon–Zwirner | 1912 | Charles George Herbermann |

The five editors of the encyclopedia convened their first editorial meeting at the offices of the Messenger of the Sacred Heart in Manhattan, New York City. In addition to frequent informal conferences and constant communication by letters, the editors held 134 formal meetings to consider the plan, scope and progress of the multi-volume reference work. This review process may have been accelerated by the reuse of older authorized publications. The editors received a nihil obstat, a declaration of no objection, from Remy Lafort, an official Church censor, on November 1, 1908. Archbishop John M. Farley of New York then gave the first volumes of the encyclopedia his imprimatur.

Publication of the Catholic Encyclopedia began in 1907 with Volume 1 Aachen–Assize. It ended with Volume 15, Tournon–Zwirner, published in 1913. A first supplement was published nine years later in 1922; a second supplement in nine loose-leaf sections was published by the Gilmary Society three decades later, between 1950 and 1958.

In 1912, a special completely illustrated, commemorative volume was awarded to those patrons who contributed to the start of the enterprise in 1907 by buying multiple encyclopedia sets early on.

There was controversy over the presence of the Catholic Encyclopedia on the shelves in public libraries in the United States, with nativist protests that this violated the separation of church and state proclaimed in the U.S. Constitution, including a successful court appeal in Belleville, New Jersey.

The original Catholic Encyclopedia was updated during the 1960s by the faculty of the Catholic University of America. The university published the New Catholic Encyclopedia in 1967, followed by several supplements over the next three decades. Catholic University published a revised second edition of the New Catholic Encyclopedia in 2002, followed by more supplements.

=== Authors and sources ===
The Catholic Encyclopedia and Its Makers states that:

The work is entirely new, and not merely a translation or a compilation from other encyclopedic sources. The editors have insisted that the articles should contain the latest and most accurate information to be obtained from the standard works on each subject.

However, "from standard works" allows that some of the articles from European contributors such as Pierre Batiffol (French) and Johann Peter Kirsch (German) had previously been published in whole or in part in Europe and were translated and edited for the Encyclopedia. Those who wrote new articles in English include Anthony Maas and Herbert Thurston.

== Online versions ==
Under the copyright law of the United States, all works published in the United States before 1928 are considered in the public domain. In 1993, Kevin Knight, a 26-year-old resident of Denver, Colorado, decided, during the visit of Pope John Paul II (1920–2005, served 1978–2005), to that city for World Youth Day, to launch a project to republish the 1907–1913 original edition of the Catholic Encyclopedia on the Internet. Knight founded the Web site New Advent to host the undertaking. Volunteers from several countries, including the United States, Canada, France, and Brazil helped in the transcription of the original text material. The site first went online two years later in 1995, and transcription work ended after four years efforts in 1997.

In 2007, Catholic Answers internet website published a watermarked version derived from page scans. This version has since been replaced with a transcription of the Encyclopedia similar to that found at the New Advent web site. The Catholic Answers transcription, however, is an exact transcription of the original text, whereas the New Advent version at times modernizes certain usages (e.g., using the titles of Old Testament books found in several Protestant versions of the Holy Bible (used in Protestant churches / denominations), such as "1 & 2 Chronicles" and "Obadiah", in place of the titles traditionally used differently in the Vulgate (Latin) / Douay–Rheims (Roman Catholic) Bible versions, (such as titles of "1 & 2 Paralipomenon" and "Abdias") and Biblical citation formatting (i.e., the Catholic Answers version retains the original's usage of Roman numerals for chapter numbers [e.g., Genesis I,1], while the New Advent version uses Arabic numerals throughout [e.g., Genesis 1:1]).

Another transcription is hosted by Catholic Online internet website. Similarly to the Catholic Answers transcription, it uses an exact rendition of the original text.

Scanned copies of the 1907-1913 Encyclopedia are available on Google Books, at the Internet Archive, and at Wikimedia Commons. Wikisource also hosts a transcription project backed by the scans hosted at Commons. (Note: Volume / Names / Year first pub. / Wikisource (Incomplete) / Internet Archive / Google Books / Chief editor; 1 / Aachen–Assize / 1907 / Wikisource 1 / Internet Archive 1 / Google Books 1 / Charles George Herbermann; 2 / Assize–Brownr / 1907 / Wikisource 2 / Internet Archive 2 / Google Books 2 / Charles George Herbermann; 3 / Brow–Clancy / 1908 / Wikisource 3 / Internet Archive 3 / Google Books 3 / Charles George Herbermann; 4 / Cland–Diocesan / 1908 / Wikisource 4 / Internet Archive 4 / Google Books 4 / Charles George Herbermann; 5 / Diocese–Fathers / 1909 / Wikisource 5 / Internet Archive 5 / Google Books 5 / Charles George Herbermann; 6 / Fathers–Gregory / 1909 / Wikisource 6 / Internet Archive 6 / Google Books 6 / Charles George Herbermann; 7 / Gregory–Infallibility / 1910 / Wikisource7 / Internet Archive 7 / Google Books 7 / Charles George Herbermann; 8 / Infamy–Lapparent / 1910 / Wikisource 8 / Internet Archive 8 / Google Books 8 / Charles George Herbermann; 9 / Laprade–Mass / 1910 / Wikisource 9 / Internet Archive 9 / Google Books 9 / Charles George Herbermann; 10 / Mass–Newman / 1911 / Wikisource 10 / Internet Archive 10 / Google Books 10 / Charles George Herbermann; 11 / New Mexico–Philip / 1911 / Wikisource 11 / Internet Archive 11 / Google Books 11 / Charles George Herbermann; 12 / Philip–Revalidation / 1911 / Wikisource 12 / Internet Archive 12 / Google Books 12 / Charles George Herbermann; 13 / Revelation–Simon Stock / 1912 / Wikisource 13 / Internet Archive 13 / Google Books 13 / Charles George Herbermann; 14 / Simony–Tournely / 1912 / Wikisource 14 / Internet Archive 14 / Google Books 14 / Charles George Herbermann; 15 / Tournon–Zwirner / 1912 / Wikisource 15 / Internet Archive 15 / Google Books 15 / Charles George Herbermann; 16 / Index / 1914 / Wikisource 16 / Internet Archive 16 / Google Books 16 / Charles George Herbermann; 17 / Supplement I / 1922 / Wikisource 17 / Internet Archive 17 / Google Books 17 / Charles George Herbermann; 18 / Supplement II / / / / Google Books 18 / Charles George Herbermann; 19 / Supplemental Year Books / / / Supplemental Year Books 1912–1922 / / Charles George Herbermann)

The 1922 supplement to the Catholic Encyclopedia is also in the public domain and is available online. The New Catholic Encyclopedia of 1967, also is available online at some academic and public libraries.

== See also ==
- Catholic Bible
- Catholic Directory
- Encyclopaedia Biblica
- Encyclopaedia Judaica
- The Jewish Encyclopedia
- Lexikon für Theologie und Kirche
- Lists of encyclopedias
- New Catholic Encyclopedia
- Orthodox Encyclopedia
- Twentieth Century Encyclopedia of Catholicism

| Volume | Names | Year first pub. | Wikisource (Incomplete) | Internet Archive | Google Books | Chief editor |
| 1 | Aachen–Assize | 1907 | Wikisource 1 | Internet Archive 1 | Google Books 1 | Charles George Herbermann |
| 2 | Assize–Brownr | 1907 | Wikisource 2 | Internet Archive 2 | Google Books 2 | Charles George Herbermann |
| 3 | Brow–Clancy | 1908 | Wikisource 3 | Internet Archive 3 | Google Books 3 | Charles George Herbermann |
| 4 | Cland–Diocesan | 1908 | Wikisource 4 | Internet Archive 4 | Google Books 4 | Charles George Herbermann |
| 5 | Diocese–Fathers | 1909 | Wikisource 5 | Internet Archive 5 | Google Books 5 | Charles George Herbermann |
| 6 | Fathers–Gregory | 1909 | Wikisource 6 | Internet Archive 6 | Google Books 6 | Charles George Herbermann |
| 7 | Gregory–Infallibility | 1910 | Wikisource7 | Internet Archive 7 | Google Books 7 | Charles George Herbermann |
| 8 | Infamy–Lapparent | 1910 | Wikisource 8 | Internet Archive 8 | Google Books 8 | Charles George Herbermann |
| 9 | Laprade–Mass | 1910 | Wikisource 9 | Internet Archive 9 | Google Books 9 | Charles George Herbermann |
| 10 | Mass–Newman | 1911 | Wikisource 10 | Internet Archive 10 | Google Books 10 | Charles George Herbermann |
| 11 | New Mexico–Philip | 1911 | Wikisource 11 | Internet Archive 11 | Google Books 11 | Charles George Herbermann |
| 12 | Philip–Revalidation | 1911 | Wikisource 12 | Internet Archive 12 | Google Books 12 | Charles George Herbermann |
| 13 | Revelation–Simon Stock | 1912 | Wikisource 13 | Internet Archive 13 | Google Books 13 | Charles George Herbermann |
| 14 | Simony–Tournely | 1912 | Wikisource 14 | Internet Archive 14 | Google Books 14 | Charles George Herbermann |
| 15 | Tournon–Zwirner | 1912 | Wikisource 15 | Internet Archive 15 | Google Books 15 | Charles George Herbermann |
| 16 | Index | 1914 | Wikisource 16 | Internet Archive 16 | Google Books 16 | Charles George Herbermann |
| 17 | Supplement I | 1922 | Wikisource 17 | Internet Archive 17 | Google Books 17 | Charles George Herbermann |
| 18 | Supplement II | | | | Google Books 18 | Charles George Herbermann |
| 19 | Supplemental Year Books | | | Supplemental Year Books 1912–1922 | | Charles George Herbermann |

== General bibliography ==
- Charles B. Herbermann; Edward A. Pace; Conde E. Pallen (1907). The Catholic encyclopedia; an international work of reference on the constitution, doctrine, discipline and history of the Catholic Church. Vol. 14 voll. New York: Robert Appleton Company – via archive.org.
