= Pope Francis: Life and Revolution =

2013 biography of Pope Francis by Elisabetta Piqué

- First edition
- Original title: Francisco: Vida y revolución
- Language: English
- Subject: Pope Francis
- Published: November 2013
- Publisher: La Esfera de los Libros
- Publication place: Argentina
- Pages: 328 (paperback)
- ISBN: 978-0-8294-4217-5

Pope Francis: Life and Revolution is a 2013 biography of Pope Francis, written by Elisabetta Piqué, Vatican correspondent for the La Nación Argentine newspaper.

== Content ==
According to the book, a voting of the 2013 Papal conclave had to be annulled, as a cardinal inadvertently included a blank paper alongside the vote. The final result included 116 votes from 115 cardinals, and the extra vote could not be identified. All the ballots were burnt, and a new voting session replaced the failed one.

== Release ==
The book was released on November 19, 2013, at the El Ateneo Grand Splendid bookstore. The presentation was attended by rabbi Abraham Skorka, academic Julio Bárbaro, Mariano Fazio from the Opus Dei, and priest Gustavo Carrara. The title uses the word "revolution" both to describe the unusual way in which Francis was appointed Pope, and the reactions to his papacy.

== Reception ==
Loyola Press considers that this biography stands out from other biographies of Francis because it is based on interviews with 75 people, including both religious people and people close to Bergoglio. They praise the research and investigation invested in the book, and that the author had the advantage of a close friendship with the subject since 2001.

The 2015 film Francis: Pray for me is based on this biography.
