= El Día que Murió el Silencio =

1997 film by Paolo Agazzi

El día que murió el silencio (The Day Silence Died) is a 1998 Bolivian drama film directed by Paolo Agazzi.

== Synopsis ==
A handsome and mysterious stranger, played by Darío Grandinetti, walks into the town square of Villaserena one day and strategically places loudspeakers around the town, blaring a variety of musical tunes. Soon, he begins to sell airtime to the various locals, who broadcast their own personal love dedications and (more frequently) insults for all to hear.

A subplot evolves between Abelardo (the stranger), Celeste (a young woman who is chained inside her father's house to stop her running away), and José (a young man).
