= Cristian Mercado =

Bolivian theater and film actor

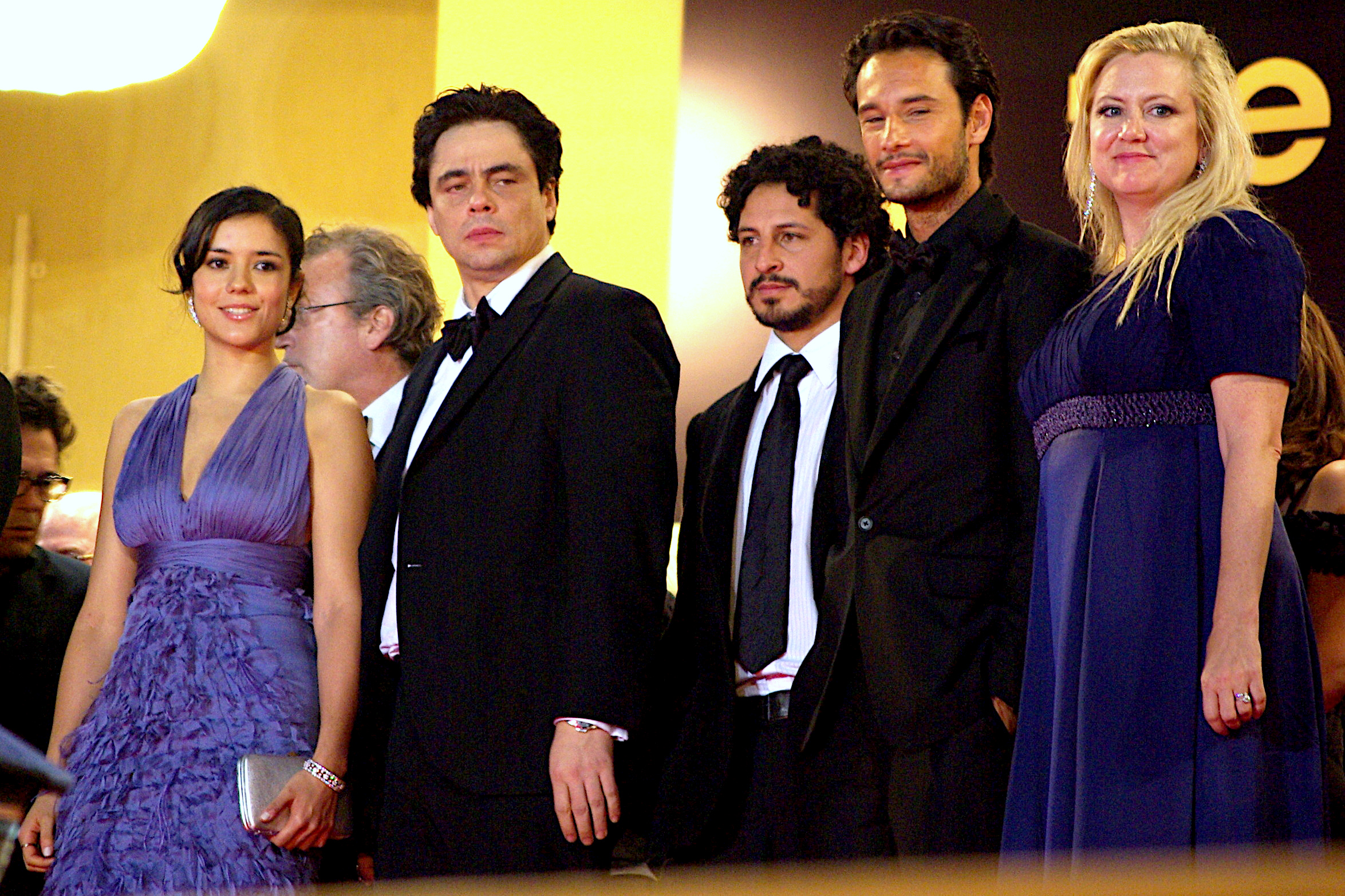
- Mercado (center, right of Benicio Del Toro
- Born: December 29, 1974 (age 51); La Paz, Bolivia
- Occupations: Theater and film actor

Cristian Mercado is a Bolivian theater and film actor.

On film, he is known for his lead role as Falso Conejo in Sena/Quina, la inmortalidad del cangrejo and as Miguel, a fisherman in Undertow (Spanish title Contracorriente) alongside Manolo Cardona, a film that won Audience Award for World Cinema Drama at Sundance Film Festival in 2010. and his role as Inti Peredo in Che: Part Two. He also co star in films as The 33 of San Jose, movie based on the true storie of the 33 miners trapped in the landslide in Chile. He was also second assistant director in Los Andes no creen en Dios (The Andes Don't Believe in God (2007).

On theater, he was part of Teatro de los Andes group and found La Oveja Negra theater in 2005. He worked in France with "Theatre Athenor", in Chile with Teatro Camino company, and with Teatro de ciertos habitantes in Mexico.

== Awards ==
- 2011: Won Best Actor Award at Rapa Nui Film Festival in Chile.
- 2014: Won Best theater actor Eduardo Abaroa Plurinational Price Bolivia

== Filmography ==
=== Directing ===
- 2007: Los Andes no creen en Dios (second assistant director)

=== Acting ===
- 2004: El atraco as Ivo
- 2005: Sena/Quina, la inmortalidad del cangrejo as Falso Conejo
- 2007: Los Andes no creen en Dios as Paco
- Desde el fondo . Best Latinamerican short film award of the United States film Directors Association 2008.
- 2008: Che: Part Two as Inti (Guido Peredo Liegue)
- 2009: Undertow (Spanish title Contracorriente) as Miguel
- 2010: The 33 of San Jose as Quechua
- 2011: Blackthorn as Bolivian Official
- 2019: Santa Clara as cowboy
- 2019: The Longest Night as Ivan
- 2024: The Southern House

Shorts

- 2008: Desde el fondo as Antonio (short)
- 2011: El último paso as Mateo (short)
