= John J. Wynne =

American Jesuit writer (1859–1948)

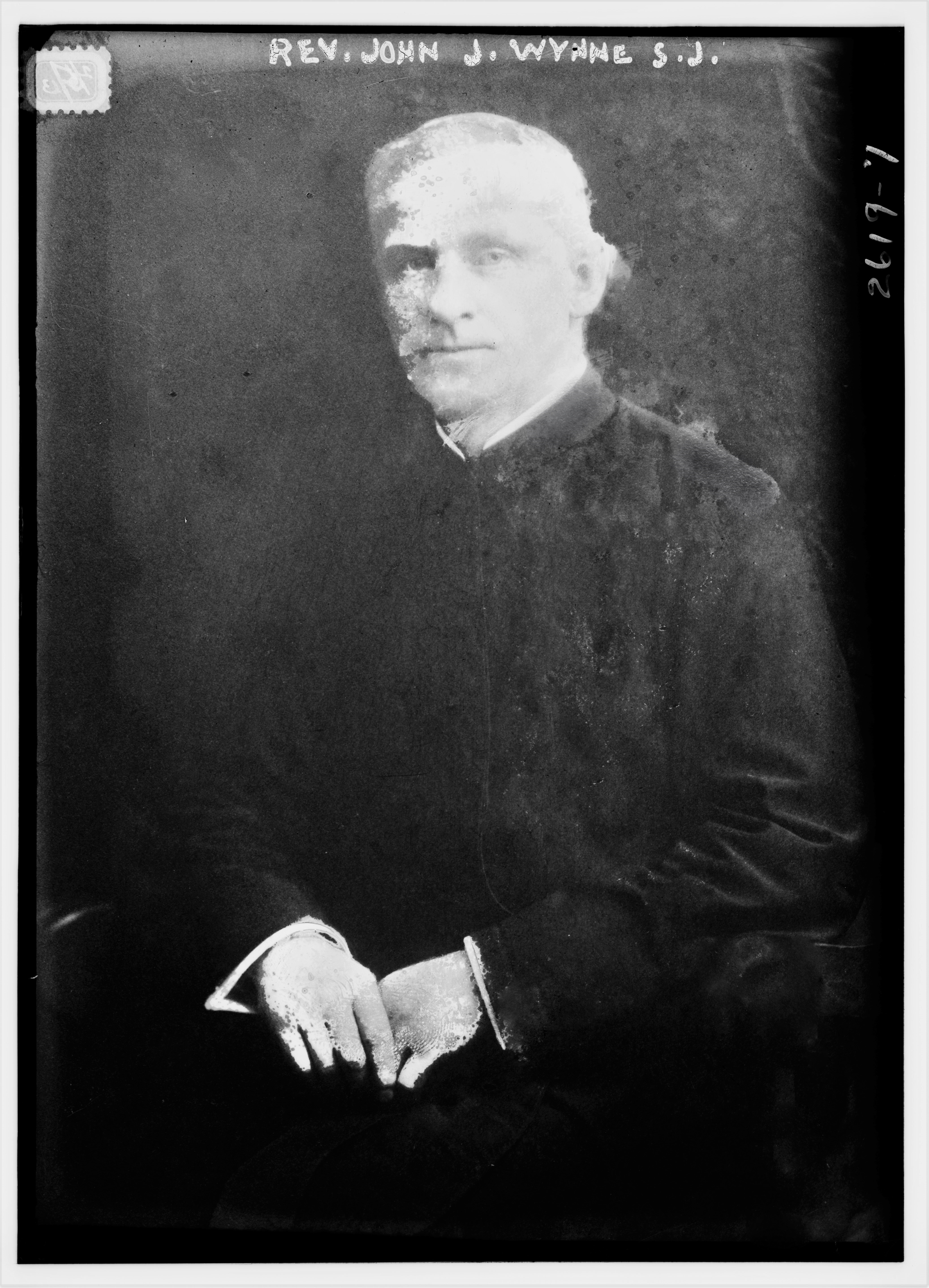
Image of Rev. John J. Wynne

John Joseph Wynne (1859–1948) was an American Jesuit priest. A prolific writer and editor, he became a leader in Catholic intellectual life in the early 20th century. He played a major role in starting America, the Jesuit weekly magazine, and the Catholic Encyclopedia. Wynne was a historian, commentator, editor and educator who worked to promote Catholic scholarship and intellectual engagement with contemporary issues.

== Career ==
He was educated at St. Francis Xavier College (BA 1876) then joined the Jesuits and studied for the priesthood at Woodstock College (1879-1882). He taught history at several Jesuit colleges, including St. Francis Xavier College (1879-1882) and Boston College (1886-1887). Ordained in 1890, he joined the staff of The Messenger and devoted his career to editing. In 1903 he organized The Catholic Encyclopedia and was its chief editor. He was the first editor of the Jesuit weekly magazine America, in 1909–1910. He founded the American Catholic Historical Association and served as its first president. He was coeditor of The Catholic Encyclopedia: An International Work of Reference on the Constitution, Doctrine, Discipline, and History of the Catholic Church (Vol 1-15 and Index. New York: Robert Appleton Company, 1907–1914), and of two supplements. He was coeditor of several large reference works in the 1920s.

Wynne was a proponent of "inculturation," the idea that Catholicism should adapt to and engage with American culture and society. He believed that American Catholics should be active participants in the social and political life of the country, and he worked to promote a Catholic social ethic that emphasized social justice and the common good.

Wynne was a key figure in the Catholic response to the modernist crisis, a theological controversy that rocked the Church in the early 20th century. He defended traditional Catholic teaching against modernist challenges, but he also sought to find a middle ground between the extremes of traditionalism and modernism.
