= My Friend (film) =

1983 film

- Directed by: Paolo Agazzi
- Written by: Paolo Agazzi
- Starring: David Sàntalla
- Cinematography: Héctor Ríos
- Release date: July 1983
- Running time: 83 minutes
- Country: Bolivia
- Language: Spanish

My Friend (Spanish: Mi socio) is a 1983 Bolivian drama film directed by Paolo Agazzi. It was entered into the 13th Moscow International Film Festival.

== Cast ==
- Guillermo Barrios as Cura
- Juana Fernández as Doña Sabasta
- Susana Hernández as Matilde
- Hugo Pozo as Mecanico
- Mariel Rivera as Arminda
- Carlos Sandallo as Novio
- Gerardo Suárez as Brillo
- David Sàntalla as Don Vito
- Blanca Irene Uría as Betty
- Miriam Villagómez as Novia
