= Elisabetta Piqué =

Argentine journalist (born 1967)

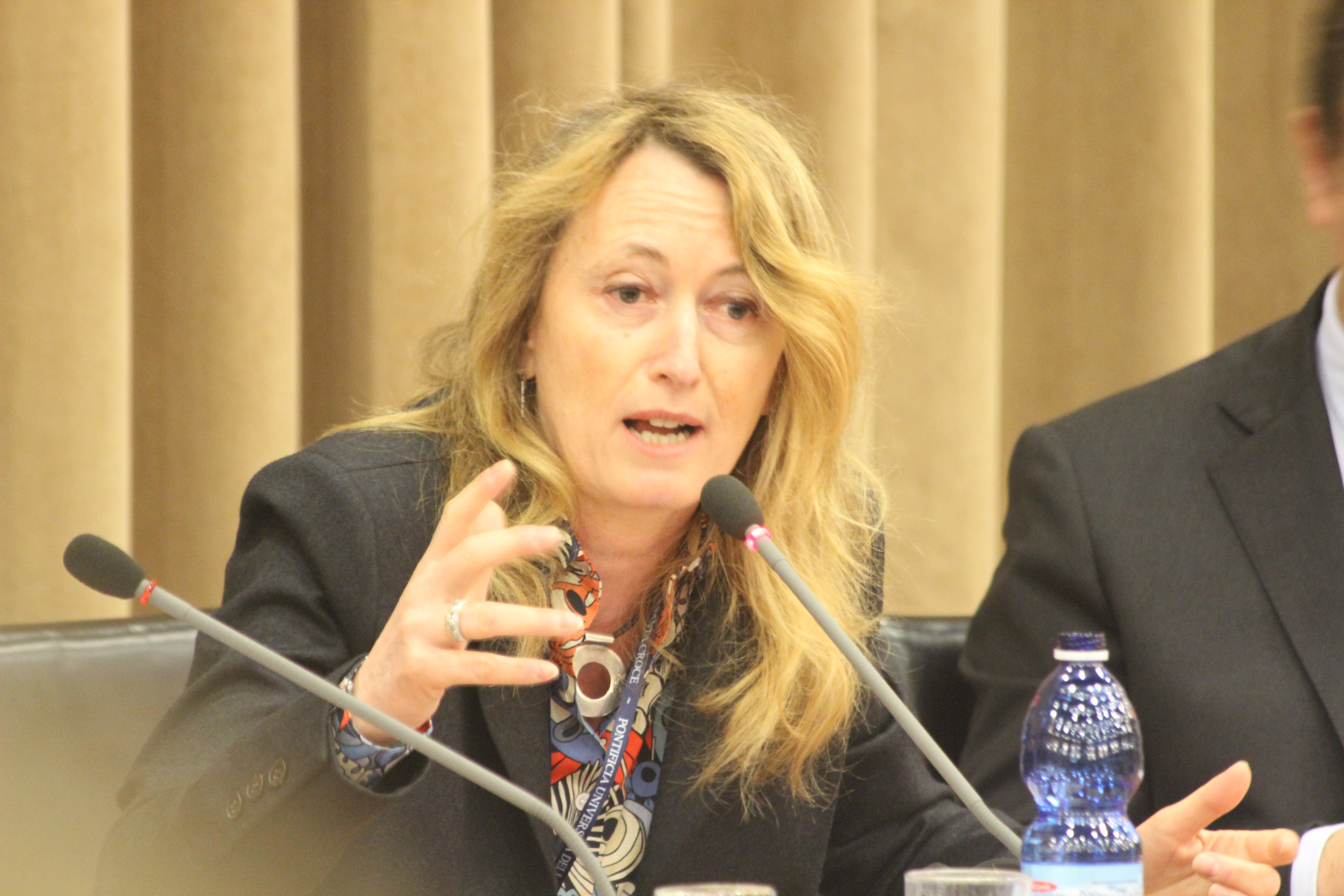
- Piqué during a conference in Rome in 2014
- Born: 1967 (age 58–59); Florence, Italy
- Occupation: Journalist
- Spouse: Gerard O'Connell

Elisabetta Piqué is an Italian-born Argentine journalist and Vatican correspondent for the newspaper La Nación. She wrote the biography Pope Francis: Life and Revolution (2013). The film Francis: Pray for Me is based on her book, and the character played by the actress Silvia Abascal is based on Piqué. She is married to America correspondent Gerard O'Connell.

Piqué co-authored the 2026 book The Election of Pope Leo XIV: The Last Surprise of Pope Francis with her husband Gerard O'Connell.
