= Francis: Pray for Me =

2015 film about Pope Francis

Francis: Pray for me
- Argentine theatrical release poster
- Francisco – El Padre Jorge
- Directed by: Beda Docampo Feijóo
- Screenplay by: César Gomez Copello; Beda Docampo Feijóo
- Based on: Pope Francis: Life and Revolution by Elisabetta Piqué
- Produced by: Agustin Bossie; Pablo Bossi
- Starring: Darío Grandinetti
- Cinematography: Kiko de la Rica
- Edited by: Mapa Pastor
- Music by: Frederico Jusid
- Distributed by: Disney Media Distribution (Argentina); Wanda Visión S.A. (Spain); Pioneer Films (Philippines)
- Release date: September 10, 2015 (Argentina)
- Running time: 104 minutes
- Country: Argentina
- Language: Spanish

Francis: Pray for me (Spanish: Francisco – El Padre Jorge, lit. 'Francis – Father Jorge') is a 2015 Argentine film, starring Darío Grandinetti as Pope Francis. The film is based on the 2013 book, Pope Francis: Life and Revolution, which was written by Francis' close friend Elisabetta Piqué who is also a correspondent for the Argentine newspaper, La Nación in Italy and the Vatican since 1999. The film was released as Papa Francisco: The Pope Francis Story in the Philippines.

== Plot ==
The story narrates the life of Jorge Mario Bergoglio (Darío Grandinetti), the man who would later become Pope Francis in the perspective of a Spanish journalist named Ana (Silvia Abascal), who first met the future pope at the 2005 Papal conclave, until the naming of Bergoglio as pope at the 2013 Papal conclave.

== Cast ==
- Darío Grandinetti as Jorge Bergoglio
- Silvia Abascal as Ana
- Leticia Brédice as Cecilia
- Laura Novoa as Regina Bergoglio
- Leonor Manso as Rosa Margherita Vasallo Bergoglio
- Jorge Marrale as José Bergoglio
- Gabriel Gallichio as Jorge Bergoglio (young)
- Alejandro Awada as Luis
- Carola Reyna as Agustina
- Marta Beláustegui as Carmen

== Production ==
The script is based on the 2013 book Pope Francis: Life and Revolution, written by journalist Elisabetta Piqué. Productor Pablo Bossi met Piqué in November 2013, and announced his intention to shoot the film. She met the script writer Beda Docampo Feijóo in January 2014, and he soon wrote the first script for the film. The actor Darío Grandinetti visited the Vatican and had a brief interview with Francis, studying him to make an accurate play. Shooting for the film began in January 2015 in Buenos Aires, Argentina.

== Release ==
The film was first released in Argentina on 10 September 2015 and was later released in Spain on 18 September 2015. In the Philippines, the film was released on theaters nationwide under the title Papa Francisco: The Pope Francis Story on 30 September 2015 with Pioneer Films as distributor.

== Reception ==
Horacio Bilbao, from the Clarín newspaper considered it a below-average film. The biography of Francis is treated like a hagiography, and the controversial aspects of his life are treated in a simplistic way. For instance, it is unclear if the character played by Alejandro Awada is supposed to be based on Horacio Verbitsky, who would be the woman asking him to ignore the political corruption scandals, and the truthfulness in the depiction of the meeting of Bergoglio and Massera.

== See also ==
- Chiamatemi Francesco, 2015 Italian film about Pope Francis
