= Los hermanos Cartagena =

- Directed by: Paolo Agazzi
- Release date: 1984
- Country: Bolivia
- Language: Spanish

Los hermanos Cartagena (English: The Cartagena Brothers) is a 1984 Bolivian film directed by Paolo Agazzi.

== Description ==
The film portrays the 1952 revolution and 1980 coup in Bolivia through the lives of two brothers, Juan José and Martín. Juan José, the legitimate son of Luís, is transformed, by his experiences as a youth in 1950s, to become a boss of one of the groups of paramilitaries during the 1980 coup. Martín, the illegitimate son of Luís and an indigenous peasant, becomes a trade union leader during that period. The film details the process by which the brothers' divergent childhood situation drives them towards the definitive clash.
