= America (magazine) =

American Jesuit Catholic magazine

America Magazine
- Editor: Sam Sawyer, S.J.
- Former editors: Drew Christiansen; Thomas J. Reese
- Categories: Catholicism
- Frequency: Monthly
- Circulation: 45,000
- Publisher: American Jesuits
- Founded: 1909
- Company: America Media
- Country: United States
- Based in: Midtown Manhattan, New York City
- Language: English
- Website: www.americamagazine.org
- ISSN: 0002-7049
- OCLC: 3612717

America is a monthly Catholic magazine published by the Jesuits of the United States and headquartered in midtown Manhattan. It contains news and opinion about Catholicism and how it relates to American politics and cultural life. It has been published continuously since 1909, and is also available online.

With its Jesuit affiliation, America has been considered a liberal-leaning publication, and has been described by The Washington Post as "a favorite of Catholic liberal intellectuals".

== History ==
The Jesuit provinces of the US founded America in New York City in 1909 as a weekly printed magazine and continue to publish the magazine in its contemporary iterations. Francis X. Talbot was editor-in-chief from 1936 to 1944.

In 2009, under the leadership of Drew Christiansen, the editorial board gave support to an invitation for US president Barack Obama to receive an honorary degree at the University of Notre Dame. This was controversial, since the United States Conference of Catholic Bishops had discouraged Catholic universities from honoring politicians and activists who supported abortion legalization.

Matt Malone became the fourteenth editor-in-chief on 1 October 2012, the youngest in the history of the magazine. In September 2013, the magazine published an interview of Pope Francis with his fellow Jesuit Antonio Spadaro.

From 1998, when Thomas J. Reese became editor-in-chief, the magazine became controversial for publishing articles and opinion pieces at variance with the teaching of the Holy See on homosexuality, priestly celibacy, birth control, the debate about induced abortion, and other matters. The Congregation for the Doctrine of the Faith proposed a committee of censors to review the magazine content. Reese resigned in May 2005. The National Catholic Reporter asserted that Reese's resignation was forced by the Vatican, although America and the Jesuit generalate in Rome denied this.

In the spring of 2014, Malone announced that America would open a bureau in Rome with Gerard O'Connell as correspondent.

On February 28, 2017, America launched a podcast, Jesuitical, targeted at young Catholics. The magazine also has an electronic presence with several publication options that include a daily newsletter.

With the July 2020 issue, the publication went from 28 issues to 14 issues per year. The magazine changed publication frequency again with the July 2022 issue, going from 14 issues to 11, with the July-August issue as a double issue.

In 2022, Matt Malone concluded his editorship after ten years.

In late 2022, Sam Sawyer became the fifteenth editor.

== See also ==
- John J. Wynne
