= The Longest Night (2019 film) =

2019 film

- Film poster
- Directed by: Gabriela Calvache
- Written by: Gabriela Calvache
- Produced by: Gabriela Calvache; Geminiano Pineda
- Starring: Noëlle Schönwald; Cristian Mercado; Jaime Tamariz; Ariana Freire; Nadine Muñoz Cervantes
- Cinematography: Gris Jordana
- Edited by: Andrea Chignoli; Amaia Merino
- Music by: Quincas Moreira
- Release date: 9 March 2019 (SXSW)
- Running time: 95 minutes
- Country: Ecuador
- Language: Spanish

The Longest Night (Spanish: La mala noche) is a 2019 Ecuadorian drama film directed by Gabriela Calvache. It was selected as the Ecuadorian entry for the Best International Feature Film at the 92nd Academy Awards, but it was not nominated. The Longest Night was Calvache's feature film debut.

== Plot ==
Dana, a prostitute, is deeply in debt and needs money to pay for her daughter's medication and for her own addiction to narcotics. After encountering a young girl, Dana resolves to help her avoid the same fate.

== Cast ==
- Noëlle Schönwald as Dana
- Cristian Mercado as Julián
- Jaime Tamariz as Nelson
- Ariana Freire as Lulu

== Production ==
During filming, Calvache deliberately sought out women to fill department head positions for the production, resulting in 80% of her crew being made up of women. The film was a co-production between Calvache’s Cineatica Films and Geminiano Pineda’s Cine Canibal of Mexico.

== Reception ==
The film had its world premiere at the 2019 South by Southwest (SXSW) festival. In an interview ahead of SXSW, Calvache stated that the making of the film was "one of the most painful experiences" of her life.

In August 2019, the Ecuadorian Academy of Visual and Cinematographic Arts selected The Longest Night as Ecuador's submission for both the Academy Awards and the Goya Awards. The film won Best International Film at the 25th New York Latino Film Festival.

Jessica Kiang, writing for Variety, praised Schönwald's "excellent, necessarily physical performance" as Dana and praised Calvacante depicting "the banality of ostensibly outlandish events" but opined that these scenes were undermined by the "deterministic swerve into genre late in the film." Kiang also questioned the ambivalent note of the film's ending, observing that the film draws attention to but does not grapple with the moral issue of human trafficking. Contrarily, while writing for Remezcla, Monica Castillo praised the film's "stunning ending" and opined that the statistics of sex trafficking displayed during the end credits helped to lend Dana's suffering with purpose by raising awareness of the problem. Castillo called the film "unflinchingly bleak" and praised the film for not fetishizing or sensationalizing its depictions of sex work.

== See also ==
- List of submissions to the 92nd Academy Awards for Best International Feature Film
- List of Ecuadorian submissions for the Academy Award for Best International Feature Film
