= Paolo Agazzi =

Italian film director

- Born: 5 May 1946 (age 80); Motta Baluffi, Italy
- Occupations: Film director Screenwriter
- Years active: 1983-present

Paolo Agazzi Sacchini (born 5 May 1946) is an Italian film director. He has resided in Bolivia since 1975. He studied political science and economics in the State University of Milan as well as directing and writing at Superior Institute of Cinematography in Milan. He was born in Motta Baluffi.

Agazzi was assistant director of Chuquiago (film) and Executive Producer of Amargo Mar, both of which were directed by Antonio Eguino. In 1979 he wrote, edited and directed the short subject Hilario Condori. In 1982 he directed the film Mi Socio, the screenplay being based on an original concept of Oscar Soria. The film was entered into the 13th Moscow International Film Festival. He wrote and directed Los Hermanos Cartagena released in 1986. After about twelve years he returned in 1997 to direct the film El Día que Murió el Silencio, his third feature film, released in 1998.

In 2005 he directed Sena/Quina, la inmortalidad del cangrejo.

Agazzi is currently working as a director in a new project to air a TV series called Sigo Siendo El Rey

== Filmography ==
As director

- Mi socio (1982)
- Los Hermanos Cartagena (1985)
- El Día que Murió el Silencio (1998)
- El Atraco (2004)
- Sena/Quina, la inmortalidad del cangrejo (2005)

As producer

- American Visa Dir. Juan Carlos Valdivia (2006)
- Escríbeme postales a Copacabana Dir. Thomas Kronthaler (2009)
