= Gerard O'Connell (journalist) =

Irish-born journalist in the United States

Gerard O'Connell is an Irish-born journalist who serves as the associate editor and Vatican correspondent for the Catholic magazine, America, published by the Jesuits in the United States.

He is the author of the book The Election of Pope Francis: An Inside Story of the Conclave That Changed History.

He is married to Elisabetta Piqué, the Vatican correspondent for the Argentine newspaper La Nación.

In March 2026 O'Connell published his book The Election of Pope Leo XIV: The Last Surprise of Pope Francis written with his wife Elisabetta Piqué.
