= Laura Mañá =

Spanish actress and director

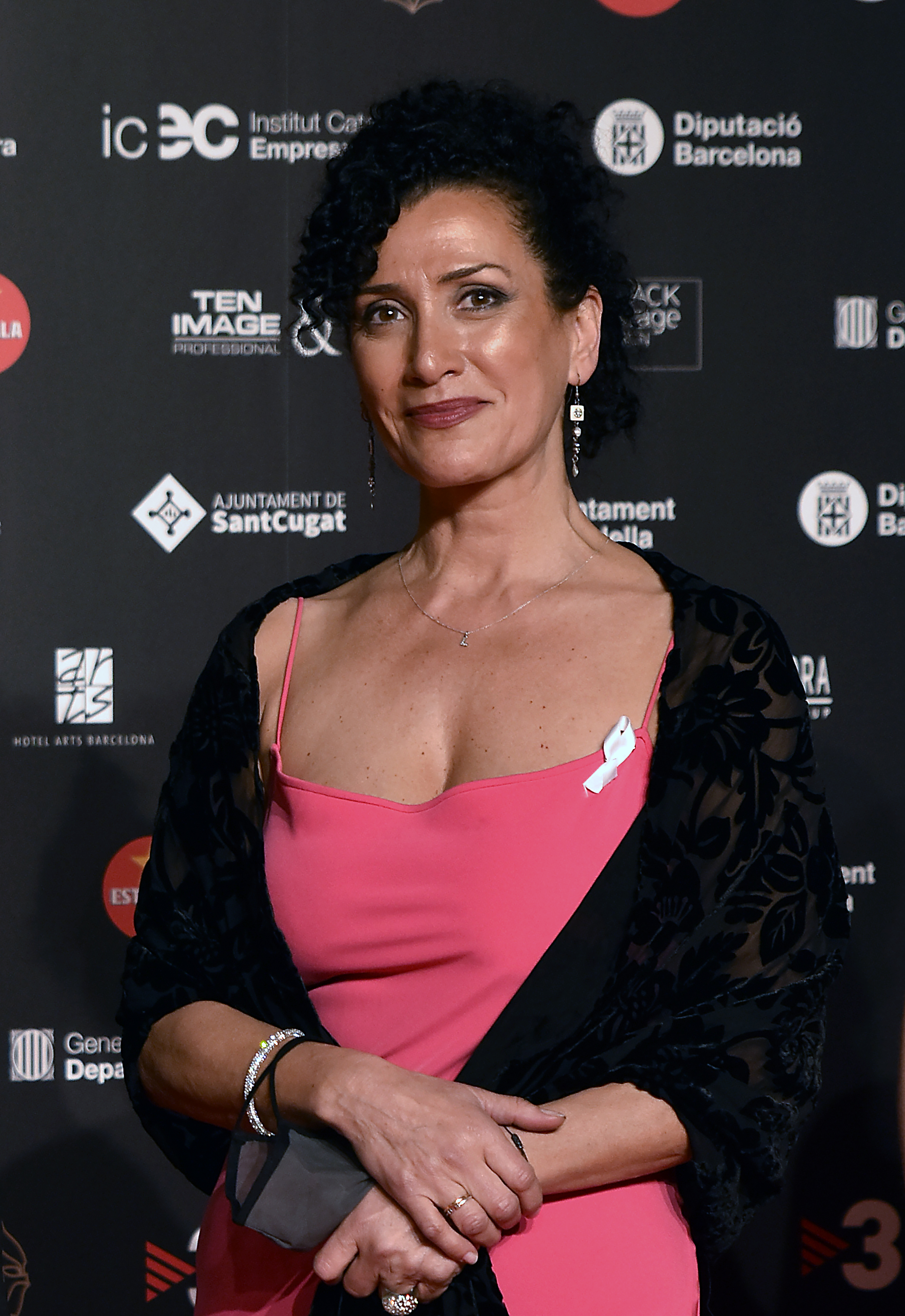
- Attending the 14th Gaudí Awards (2022)
- Born: Laura Mañá Alvarenga; 12 January 1968 (age 58); Barcelona, Spain
- Occupations: Film director; screenwriter; actress

Laura Mañá Alvarenga (born 12 January 1968) is an actress, film director and screenwriter. She was born in Barcelona. As an actress, she has worked for directors such as Bigas Luna or Vicente Aranda. In 1997 she directed Paraules, her first short film and in 2000 her first feature film, Sexo por compassion, selected at the Sundance and Toronto film festivals and awarded at the Malaga Film Festival (Best Film and Audience Award) and at the Festival de Miami (Best Screenplay), among others.

== Filmography ==
=== As a director and screen writer ===
- Paraules, 1997
- Sexo por compasión, 2000
- Killing Words, 2003
- Morir en San Hilario, 2005
- Te quiero, imbécil, 2020
- Un novio para mi mujer, 2022

=== As an actress ===
- Lolita al desnudo, 1991
- La Teta y la luna, 1994
- Pizza Arrabbiata, 1995
- Libertarias, 1996
- Romasanta, 2004
- El cuerpo en llamas, 2023
