= Cabinet of Mamerto Urriolagoitía =

Bolivian presidential administration and ministerial cabinet from 1949 to 1951

Urriolagoitía cabinet
- 121st–125th Cabinet of the Republic of Bolivia
- 1949–1951
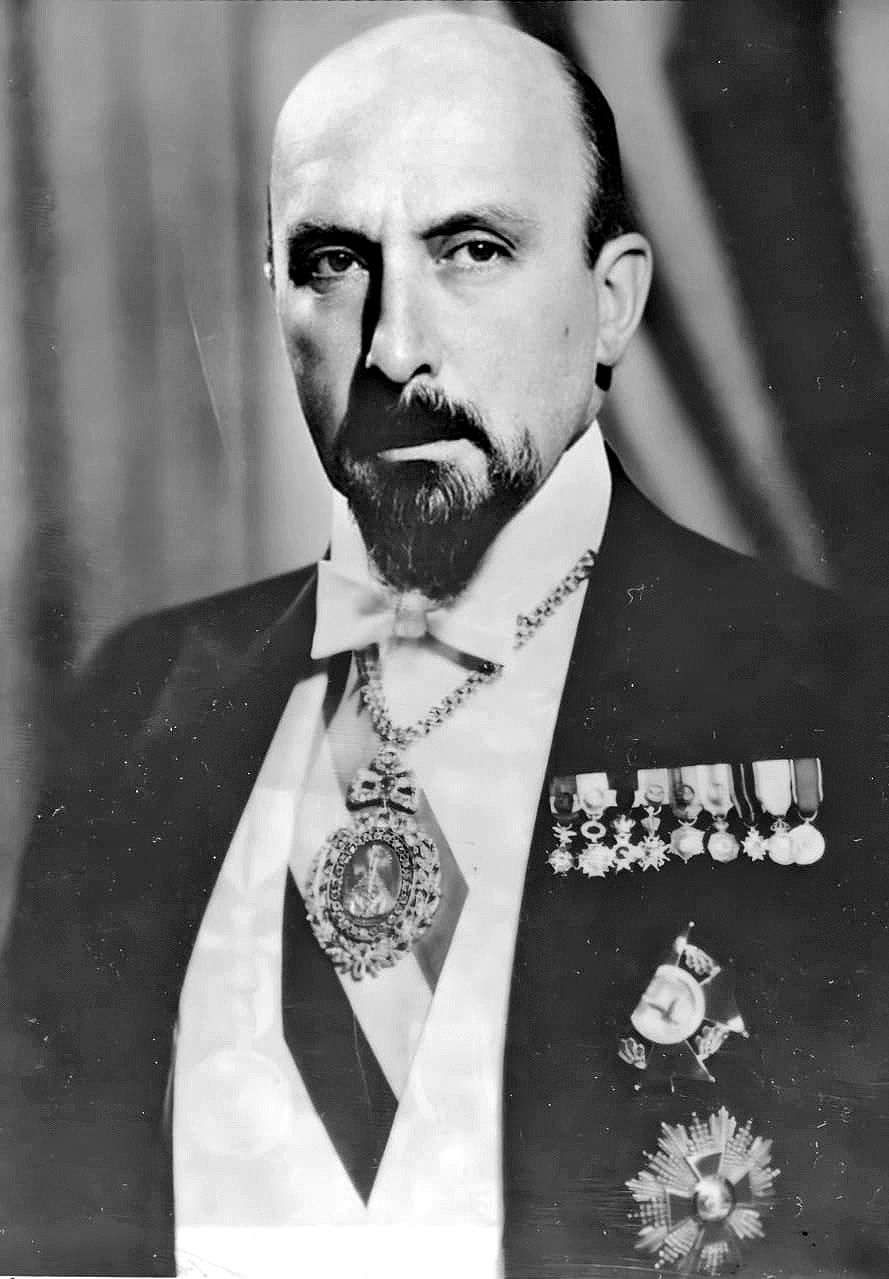
- Date formed: 20 May 1949 (Note: While Urriolagoitía's presidency officially began on 24 October 1949, he had been acting president since 7 May, forming his own cabinet on 20 May.)
- Date dissolved: 16 May 1951

People and organisations
- President: Mamerto Urriolagoitía
- Vice President: Vacant
- No. of ministers: 10 (on 16 May 1951)
- Total no. of members: 40 (including former members)
- Member party: Republican Socialist Unity Party (PURS)
- Status in legislature: Majority government

History
- Legislature term: 1949–1951
- Predecessor: Cabinet of Enrique Hertzog
- Successor: Cabinet of Hugo Ballivián

Mamerto Urriolagoitía assumed office as the 43rd President of Bolivia on 24 October 1949, and his term was terminated upon his resignation in a self-coup on 16 May 1951. The vice president of Enrique Hertzog, Urriolagoitía had already been serving as acting president since 7 May 1949 but officially took office after Hertzog presented his resignation on 22 October.

Urriolagoitía formed three cabinets during his 18-month presidency, constituting the 123rd to 125th national cabinets of Bolivia. A further two cabinets, constituting the 121st and 122nd national cabinets, were formed while he was still acting president during the term of his predecessor Enrique Hertzog but are generally regarded as his first and second cabinets rather than Hertzog's eight and ninth.

== Cabinet ministers ==
Cabinet of Bolivia Presidency of Mamerto Urriolagoitía, 1949–1951
| Office | | Minister | Party | Prof. | Term | Days | N.C (Note: Denoting which national cabinet the minister was originally a part of.) | P.C (Note: Denoting which presidential cabinet the minister was originally a part of.) |
|---|---|---|---|---|---|---|---|---|
| President | | Mamerto Urriolagoitía | PURS | Law. | 24 October 1949 – 16 May 1951; Acting: 7 May 1949 – 24 October 1949 | 569 | – | – |
| Vice President | | Office vacant throughout presidency | | | | | – | – |
| Minister of Foreign Affairs and Worship (Chancellor) | | Waldo Belmonte Pool | PURS | Law. | 20 May 1949 – 2 August 1949 | 74 | 121 | 1 (Note: Member of the first cabinet of Mamerto Urriolagoitía as acting president.) |
| Minister of Foreign Affairs and Worship (Chancellor) | | Alberto Saavedra Nogales | PURS | Law. | 2 August 1949 – 28 January 1950 | 179 | 122 | 2 (Note: Member of the second cabinet of Mamerto Urriolagoitía as acting president and first Urriolagoitía cabinet as president.) |
| Minister of Foreign Affairs and Worship (Chancellor) | | Pedro Zilveti | PURS | Law. | 28 January 1950 – 16 May 1951 | 473 | 123 | 3 |
| Minister of Foreign Affairs and Worship (Chancellor) | | Pedro Zilveti | PURS | Law. | 28 January 1950 – 16 May 1951 | 473 | 124 | 4 |
| Minister of Foreign Affairs and Worship (Chancellor) | | Pedro Zilveti | PURS | Law. | 28 January 1950 – 16 May 1951 | 473 | 125 | 5 |
| Minister of Government, Justice, and Immigration | | Alfredo Mollinedo | PURS | Dr. | 11 September 1947 – 14 April 1950 | 946 | 120 (Note: Originally a member of the 116th–120th national cabinets of Bolivia) | 7 (Note: Originally a member of the Hertzog ministerial cabinet.) |
| Minister of Government, Justice, and Immigration | | Alfredo Mollinedo | PURS | Dr. | 11 September 1947 – 14 April 1950 | 946 | 121 | 1 |
| Minister of Government, Justice, and Immigration | | Alfredo Mollinedo | PURS | Dr. | 11 September 1947 – 14 April 1950 | 946 | 122 | 2 |
| Minister of Government, Justice, and Immigration | | Jorge Rodriguez | Military | Mil. | 14 April 1950 – 29 June 1950 | 76 | 123 | 3 |
| Minister of Government, Justice, and Immigration | | Ciro Félix Trigo | PURS | Law. | 29 June 1950 – 10 August 1950 | 42 | 124 | 4 |
| Minister of Government, Justice, and Immigration | | Luís Ponce Lozada | PURS | Law. | 10 August 1950 – 15 February 1951 | 189 | 124 | 4 |
| Minister of Government, Justice, and Immigration | | José Saavedra Suárez | PURS | – | 15 February 1951 – 16 May 1951 | 90 | 125 | 5 |
| Minister of National Defense | | Vicente Leyton | – | – | 20 May 1949 – 2 August 1949 | 74 | 121 | 1 |
| Minister of National Defense | | Manuel Diez Canseco (Note: Acting Foreign Minister in the absence of Alberto Saavedra Nogales from 2 to 17 August 1949.) | PURS | Law. | 2 August 1949 – 28 January 1950 | 179 | 122 | 2 |
| Minister of National Defense | | Hugo Ernst Rivera | PURS | Dip. | 28 January 1950 – 29 June 1950 | 152 | 123 | 3 |
| Minister of National Defense | | Juan Rivero Torres | Ind. | Eng. | 29 June 1950 – 16 October 1950 | 109 | 124 | 4 |
| Minister of National Defense | | Alfredo Gutiérrez Salgar | – | – | 16 October 1950 – 15 February 1951 | 122 | 124 | 4 |
| Minister of National Defense | | Luís Ponce Lozada | PURS | Law. | 15 February 1951 – 16 May 1951 | 90 | 125 | 5 |
| Minister of Finance and Statistics | | Alfredo Alexander Alvestegui | – | Law. | 20 May 1949 – 2 August 1949 | 74 | 121 | 1 |
| Minister of Finance and Statistics | | Rafael Parada Suarez | – | – | 2 August 1949 – 28 January 1950 | 179 | 122 | 2 |
| Minister of Finance and Statistics | | Ernesto Fricke Lemoine | – | – | 28 January 1950 – 29 June 1950 | 152 | 123 | 3 |
| Minister of Finance and Statistics | | José Romero Loza | – | Law. | 29 June 1950 – 9 September 1950 | 72 | 124 | 4 |
| Minister of Finance and Statistics | | Julio Alvarado | – | Law. | 9 September 1950 – 16 May 1951 | 249 | 124 | 4 |
| Minister of Finance and Statistics | | Julio Alvarado | – | Law. | 9 September 1950 – 16 May 1951 | 249 | 125 | 5 |
| Minister of Economy | | Alberto Sarti Peláez | – | – | 20 May 1949 – 2 August 1949 | 74 | 121 | 1 |
| Minister of Economy | | José Romero Loza | – | – | 2 August 1949 – 28 January 1950 | 179 | 122 | 2 |
| Minister of Economy | | Raul Gutiérrez Granier | PL | Law. | 28 January 1950 – 10 April 1950 | 152 | 123 | 3 |
| Minister of Economy | | Luis Nardín Rivas | – | – | 10 April 1950 – 5 May 1951 | 231 | 124 | 4 |
| Minister of Economy | | Domingo L. Ramírez | – | Law. | 5 May 1951 – 16 May 1951 | 90 | 125 | 5 |
| Minister of Public Works and Communications | | Guillermo Gutiérrez; Vea Murguía | PURS | – | 28 January 1949 – 25 June 1949 | 148 | 120 (Note: Originally a member of the 119th–120th national cabinets of Bolivia) | 7 |
| Minister of Public Works and Communications | | Guillermo Gutiérrez; Vea Murguía | PURS | – | 28 January 1949 – 25 June 1949 | 148 | 121 | 1 |
| Minister of Public Works and Communications | | Office vacant 25 June 1949 – 2 August 1949 | | | | 38 | 121 | 1 |
| Minister of Public Works and Communications | | Alfredo Gutiérrez Salgar | – | – | 2 August 1949 – 16 October 1950 | 440 | 122 | 2 |
| Minister of Public Works and Communications | | Alfredo Gutiérrez Salgar | – | – | 2 August 1949 – 16 October 1950 | 440 | 123 | 3 |
| Minister of Public Works and Communications | | Lucio Zabalaga | – | – | 16 October 1950 – 15 February 1951 | 122 | 124 | 4 |
| Minister of Public Works and Communications | | Augusto Salamanca | – | Eng. | 15 February 1951 – 16 May 1951 | 90 | 125 | 5 |
| Minister of Work and Social Security | | Germán Zegarra Caero | – | – | 20 May 1949 – 2 August 1949 | 74 | 121 | 1 |
| Minister of Work and Social Security | | Eduardo del Grando | – | – | 2 August 1949 – 28 January 1950 | 179 | 122 | 2 |
| Minister of Work and Social Security | | Ernesto Monasterioes | – | – | 28 January 1950 – 14 April 1950 | 76 | 123 | 3 |
| Minister of Work and Social Security | | Antenor Ichazo | Military | Mil. | 14 April 1950 – 29 June 1950 | 76 | 123 | 3 |
| Minister of Work and Social Security | | Roberto Pérez Paton | – | Law. | 29 June 1950 – 16 May 1951 | 321 | 124 | 4 |
| Minister of Work and Social Security | | Roberto Pérez Paton | – | Law. | 29 June 1950 – 16 May 1951 | 321 | 125 | 5 |
| Minister of Health and Hygiene | | Juan Manuel Balcázar | PURS | Dr. | 4 March 1949 – 2 August 1949 | 151 | 120 (Note: Originally a member of the 120th national cabinet of Bolivia) | 7 |
| Minister of Health and Hygiene | | Juan Manuel Balcázar | PURS | Dr. | 4 March 1949 – 2 August 1949 | 151 | 121 | 1 |
| Minister of Health and Hygiene | | Agustín Benavides | – | – | 2 August 1949 – 28 January 1950 | 179 | 122 | 2 |
| Minister of Health and Hygiene | | Felix Veintemillas | Ind. | Med. | 28 January 1950 – 16 May 1951 | 473 | 123 | 3 |
| Minister of Health and Hygiene | | Felix Veintemillas | Ind. | Med. | 28 January 1950 – 16 May 1951 | 473 | 124 | 4 |
| Minister of Health and Hygiene | | Felix Veintemillas | Ind. | Med. | 28 January 1950 – 16 May 1951 | 473 | 125 | 5 |
| Minister of Education and Indigenous Affairs | Minister of Fine Arts | Elizardo Pérez | Ind. | Tch. | 20 May 1949 – 2 August 1949 | 74 | 121 | 1 |
| Minister of Education | – | Abraham Valdez | – | – | 2 August 1949 – 29 June 1950 | 331 | 122 | 2 |
| Minister of Education | – | Abraham Valdez | – | – | 2 August 1949 – 29 June 1950 | 331 | 123 | 3 |
| Minister of Education | Minister of Fine Arts | Vicente Ardaya | – | – | 29 June 1950 – 15 February 1951 | 231 | 124 | 4 |
| Minister of Education | Minister of Fine Arts | Vicente Mendoza López | Ind. | Eco. | 15 February 1951 – 16 May 1951 | 90 | 125 | 5 |
| Minister of Agriculture, Livestock, and Colonization | | Gilfredo Cortés Candia | PURS | Wri. | 20 May 1949 – 28 January 1950 | 253 | 121 | 1 |
| Minister of Agriculture, Livestock, and Colonization | | Gilfredo Cortés Candia | PURS | Wri. | 20 May 1949 – 28 January 1950 | 253 | 122 | 2 |
| Minister of Agriculture, Livestock, and Colonization | | Ciro Félix Trigo | PURS | Law. | 28 January 1950 – 29 June 1950 | 152 | 123 | 3 |
| Minister of Agriculture, Livestock, and Colonization | | Carlos Gonzalo de Saavedra | PURS | Law. | 29 June 1950 – 15 February 1951 | 231 | 124 | 4 |
| Minister of Agriculture, Livestock, and Colonization | | José Gil Soruco | PURS | Law. | 15 February 1951 – 16 May 1951 | 90 | 125 | 5 |

== Gallery ==
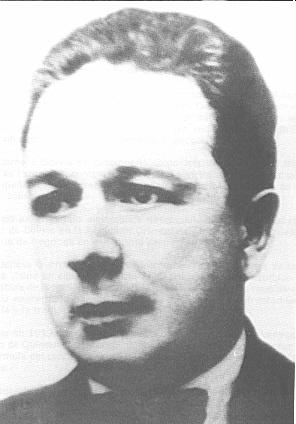
Waldo Belmonte Pool – Minister of Foreign Affairs (PURS)

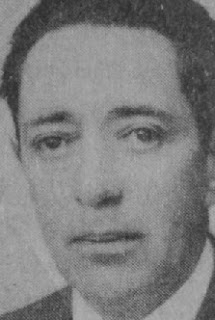
Alberto Saavedra Nogales – Minister of Foreign Affairs (PURS)

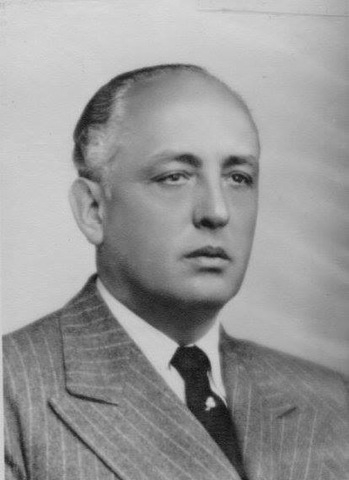
Pedro Zilveti – Minister of Foreign Affairs (PURS)

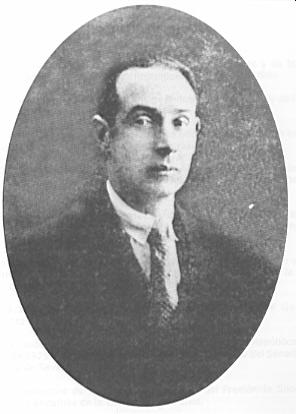
Manuel Diez Canseco – Minister of National Defense (PURS)

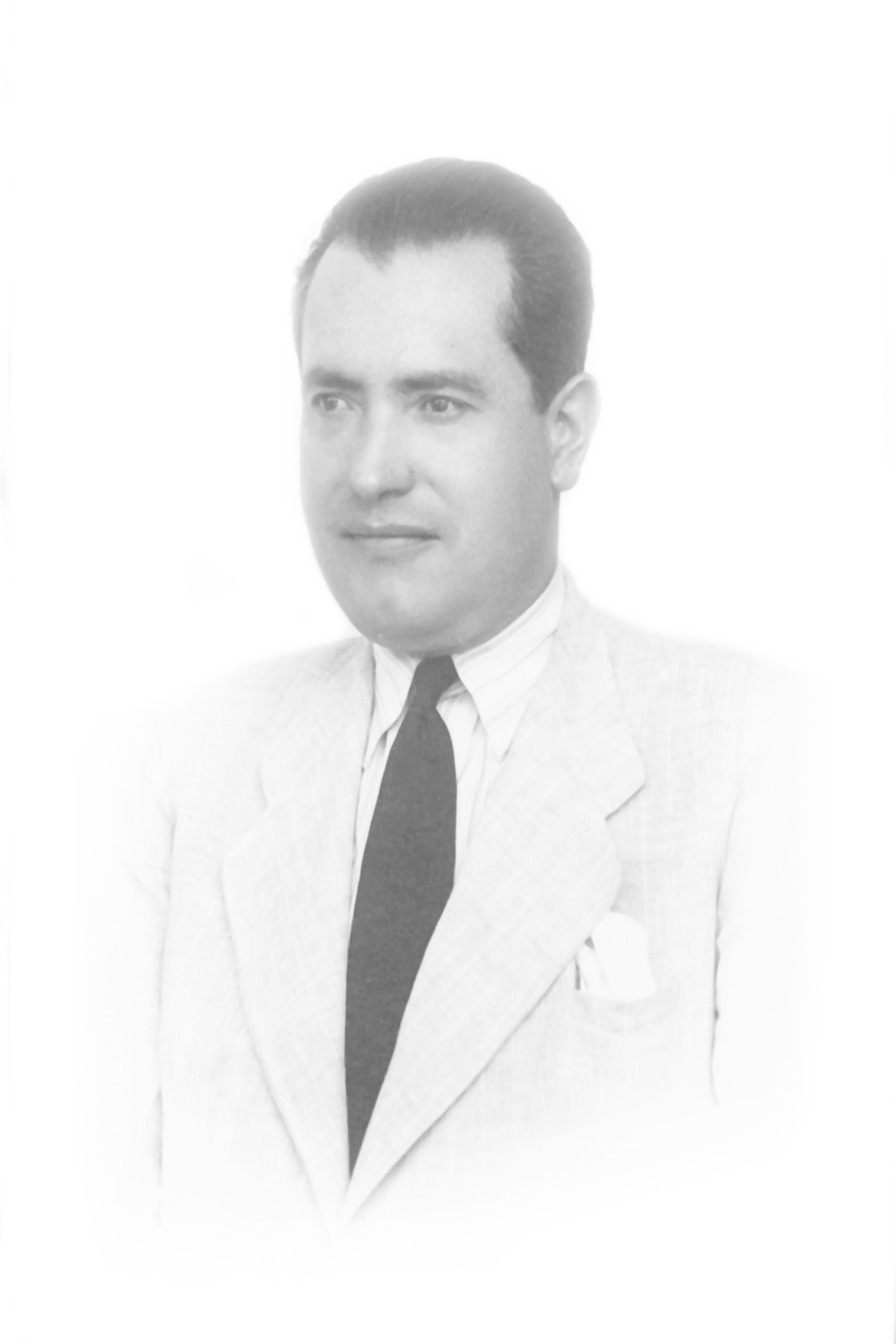
Juan Rivero Torres – Minister of National Defense

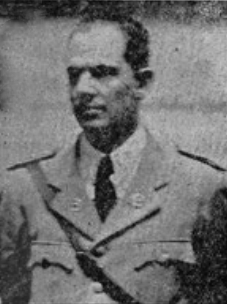
Antenor Ichazo – Minister of Work

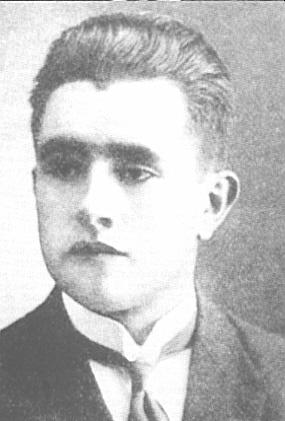
Juan Manuel Balcázar – Minister of Health (PURS)

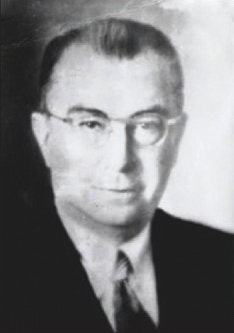
Felix Veintemillas – Minister of Health

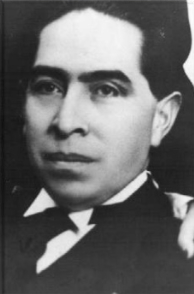
Vicente Mendoza López – Minister of Education

== Bibliography ==
- Gisbert, Carlos D. Mesa (2003). Presidentes de Bolivia: entre urnas y fusiles : el poder ejecutivo, los ministros de estado (in Spanish). Editorial Gisbert. pp. 350–352.
