= Frankowski =

Frankowski (Polish pronunciation: [franˈkɔfski]; feminine: Frankowska; plural: Frankowscy) is a Polish-language surname. It may refer to:

- Krzysztof Frankowski (born 1959), Polish footballer
- Leo Frankowski (1943–2008), American writer
- Mariusz Frankowski (born 1978), Polish politician
- Przemysław Frankowski (born 1995), Polish footballer
- Rosie Frankowski (born 1991), American skier
- Stefan Frankowski (1887–1940), Polish Navy officer
- Tomasz Frankowski (born 1974), Polish footballer
- Wacław Frankowski (1903–1981), Polish labour activist
