= Seminar on the Acquisition of Latin American Library Materials =

Library association for promoting Latin American academia

SALALM
- Seminar on the Acquisition of Latin American Library Materials
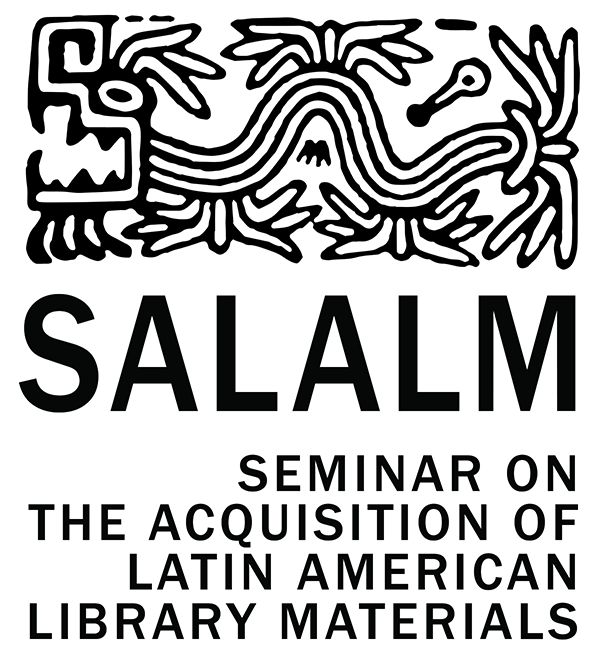
- Formation: 1956; 70 years ago
- President: Laura Martin
- Co-Executive Director: Jill Baron
- Co-Executive Director: Angela Carreño
- Website: https://salalm.org/

The Seminar on the Acquisition of Latin American Library Materials (SALALM) is the oldest professional Area Studies library organization for academic librarians, archivists, book vendors, scholars, and students who specialize in Latin American and Caribbean Studies. Members are from at least 20 different countries. SALALM promotes better library services and purchasing power among individual members and member libraries. With the Secretariat based at New York University, it is an international non-profit professional organization with three official languages: English, Spanish, and Portuguese. SALALM is an affiliate of the American Library Association. As of May 2015, the organization had 242 personal and 84 institutional members including librarians, archivists, book dealers, vendors, and university libraries.

== History ==
SALALM had its first meeting in 1956 with approximately 30 librarians and professors and one international bookseller met in Florida at Chinsegut Hill in a meeting convened by the Pan-American Union. Their discussions were “concerned with the selection, acquisition, and processing of library materials from the Latin American nations and the dependent territories of the Caribbean.” Although participants thought this meeting would be a one-time occurrence, they agreed there was a need for more study of the challenges with acquisitions and to continue the discussion by meeting for annual seminars held at the invitation of an institution or organization. Each conference has a theme, like the 57th annual conference theme, "Popular Culture: Arts and Social Change in Latin America," and plenary sessions may discuss the theme, present new research or projects related to Latin American Librarianship, or share committee reports.

Since the 1960s, SALALM has published a number of serials and monograph series including a newsletter, conference proceedings, progress reports, and bibliographies. Conference proceedings cover topics like "The Handbook of Latin American Studies: Its Automated History and a Comparison of Available Formats." The archival records of the organization are held at the Benson Latin American Collection at the University of Texas at Austin.

Since 1956, SALALM has provided a unique national and international forum that focuses on library collection development and services related to Latin American resources. SALALM was incorporated as a nonprofit organization in 1968, and the members adopted a constitution and bylaws and elected A. Curtis Wilgus as the first president. An Executive Board administers SALALM from the Secretariat, which, as of July 2023, is headquartered at the New York University Center for Latin American and Caribbean Studies (previously at the Latin American Library at Tulane University). The operational aspects are managed by several Executive Board committees. Program committees take care of intellectual and technical activities related to the resources and services of libraries with Latin American collections. The SALALM Secretariat is typically housed for three to five year periods at institutions that have strong Latin American programs. Jill Baron and Angela Carreño are the current Co-Executive Directors.

=== Locations of past conferences and presidents ===
SALALM has held conferences is North and South America, Europe, and the Caribbean. In the table below, Presidents are listed with institutional affiliations, if applicable, at the time of their service during the year the end of their terms.

Table showing the ordinal number, year, institution, and location of past SALALM Conferences.
Number	Year	Host Institution	Location	SALALM President, and Institution
I	1956	University of Florida	Chinsegut Hill, Florida, USA	*
II	1957	The University of Texas at Austin	Austin, Texas, USA	*
III	1958	University of California, Berkeley	Berkeley, California, USA	*
IV	1959	Library of Congress	Washington, DC, USA	*
V	1960	New York Public Library	New York, New York, USA	*
VI	1961	Southern Illinois University	Carbondale, Illinois, USA	*
VII	1962	University of Miami	Coral Gables, Florida, USA	*
VIII	1963	University of Wisconsin–Madison	Madison, Wisconsin, USA	*
IX	1964	Washington University in St. Louis	St. Louis, Missouri, USA	*
X	1965	Wayne State University	Detroit, Michigan, USA	*
XI	1966	Columbia University	New York, New York, USA	*
XII	1967	University of California, Los Angeles	Pasadena, California, USA	*
XIII	1968	University of Kansas	Lawrence, Kansas, USA	(the first president elected—term ends in 1969)
XIV	1969	University of Puerto Rico	San Juan, Puerto Rico	A. Curtis Wilgus, unaffiliated
XV	1970	University of Toronto	Toronto, Ontario, Canada	Carl Deal, U. of Illinois at Urbana-Champaign
XVI	1971		Puebla, Mexico	Nettie Lee Benson, U. of Texas at Austin
XVII	1972	University of Massachusetts	Amherst, Massachusetts, USA	Glenn Read, Cornell U.
XVIII	1973	University of the West Indies	Port-of-Spain, Trinidad	Donald Wisdom, Library of Congress
XIX	1974	University of Texas at Austin	Austin, Texas, USA	Rosa Q. Mesa, U. of Florida
XX	1975		Bogotá, Colombia	Emma Simonsen, Indiana U.
XXI	1976	Indiana University	Bloomington, Indiana, USA	Rosa Abella, U. of Miami
XXII	1977	University of Florida	Gainesville, Florida, USA	Mary Ruth Magruder Brady, U. of Saskatchewan
XXIII	1978	Institute of Latin American Studies, University of London	London, England	William V. Jackson, U. of Texas at Austin
XXIV	1979	University of California, Los Angeles	Pasadena, California, USA	Alma T. Jordan, U. of West Indies
XXV	1980	University of New Mexico	Albuquerque, New Mexico, USA	Ludwig "Larry" Lauerhass Jr., U. of California Los Angeles
XXVI	1981	Tulane University	New Orleans, Louisiana, USA	Laura Gutiérrez-Witt, U. of Texas at Austin
XXVII (joint meeting with LASA)	1982	Library of Congress	Washington, DC, USA	Barbara Valk, U. of California Los Angeles
XXVIII	1983	University of Kansas & University of Costa Rica	University of Kansas & Universidad de Costa Rica, San José, Costa Rica, USA	Jane Garner, U. of Texas at Austin
XXIX	1984	University of North Carolina at Chapel Hill	Chapel Hill, North Carolina, USA	John Hébert, Library of Congress
XXX	1985	Princeton University	Princeton, New Jersey, USA	Dan C. Hazen, unaffiliated (formerly at Stanford U.)
XXXI	1986	Ibero-American Institute	Berlin, Germany	Iliana Sontag, San Diego State U.
XXXII (joint meeting with ACURIL)	1987	University of Miami	Coral Gables, Florida, USA	Mina Jane Grothey, U. of New Mexico
XXXIII	1988	University of California, Berkeley & Stanford University	Berkeley, California, USA	Paula Covington, Vanderbilt U.
XXXIV	1989	University of Virginia	Charlottesville, Virginia, USA	Barbara Jon Robinson, U. of Southern California
XXXV	1990	Library of Congress Office, Rio & Fundação Getúlio Vargas	Rio de Janeiro, Brazil	Ann Hartness, U. of Texas at Austin
XXXVI	1991	San Diego State University & University of California, San Diego	San Diego, California, USA	Deborah Jakubs, Duke U.
XXXVII	1992	The University of Texas at Austin	Austin, Texas, USA	David Block, Cornell U.
XXXVIII	1993	Feria Internacional del Libro & Instituto de Bibliotecas, Universided de Guadalajara	Guadalajara, Jalisco, Mexico	Patricia Noble, U. of London
XXXIX	1994	Brigham Young University	Salt Lake City, Utah, USA	Nelly Sfeir González, U. of Illinois at Urbana-Champaign
XL	1995	University of Georgia	Athens, Georgia, USA	Robert A. McNeil, Oxford U. (England)
XLI	1996	New York University, New York Public Library, Columbia University	New York, New York, USA	Peter Stern, Rutgers U.
XLII	1997	Library of Congress, Oliveira Lima Library, and University of Maryland	Rockville, Maryland, USA	Mark Grover, Brigham Young U.
XLIII	1998	University of Puerto Rico	San Juan, Puerto Rico	Gayle Ann Williams, U. of Georgia
XLIV	1999	Vanderbilt University	Nashville, Tennessee, USA	Richard Phillips, U. of Florida
XLV	2000	University of California, Los Angeles	Long Beach, California, USA	César Rodríguez, Yale U.
XLVI	2001	Arizona State University	Tempe, Arizona, USA	Victor Federico Torres, Universidad de Puergo Rico
XLVII	2002	Cornell University	Ithaca, New York, USA	Denise A. Hibay, New York Public Library
XLVIII	2003	Banco de la República, Biblioteca Luis Ángel Arango	Cartagena, Colombia	Darlene Hull, U. of Connecticut
XLIX	2004	University of Michigan	Ann Arbor, Michigan, USA	Angela Carreño, New York U.
L	2005	University of Florida	Gainesville, Florida, USA	Pamela Howard-Reguindin, Library of Congress
LI	2006	Stanford University	Santo Domingo, Dominican Republic	Adán Griego, Stanford U.
LII	2007	University of New Mexico	Albuquerque, New Mexico, USA	Molly Molloy, New Mexico State U.
LIII	2008	Tulane University	New Orleans, Louisiana, USA	John Wright, Brigham Young U.
LIV	2009	Ibero-American Institute	Berlin, Germany	Pamela Graham, Columbia U.
LV	2010	Brown University	Providence, Rhode Island, USA	Fernando Acosta-Rodríguez, Princeton U.
LVI	2011	University of Pennsylvania and Temple University	Philadelphia, Pennsylvania, USA	Nerea Llamas, U. of Michigan
LVII	2012	University of the West Indies, St Augustine, The National Library and Information System Authority of Trinidad and Tobago, Trinidad and Tobago and the Library Association of Trinidad and Tobago	Trinidad and Tobago	Lynn Shirey, Harvard U.
LVIII	2013	University of Miami Libraries and Florida International University Libraries	Coral Gables, Florida, USA	Martha Mantilla, U. of Pittsburgh
LIX	2014	Brigham Young University	Salt Lake City, Utah, USA	Robert Delgadillo, U. of California Davis
LX	2015	Princeton University	Princeton, New Jersey, USA	Luis A. González, Indiana U.
LXI	2016	University of Virginia	Charlottesville, Virginia, USA	Paloma Celis Carbajal, U. of Wisconsin-Madison
LXII	2017	University of Michigan	Ann Arbor, Michigan, USA	Daisy V. Domínguez, The City College of New York (CUNY)
LXIII	2018	El Colegio de México	Mexico City, Mexico	Suzanne Schadl, U. of New Mexico
LXIV	2019	The University of Texas at Austin	Austin, Texas, USA	Melissa Guy, U. of Texas at Austin
LXV (All but business meetings postponed due to COVID-19 pandemic)	2020	University of California, Davis	Sacramento, California, USA	Sarah Buck-Kachaluba, U. of California San Diego
LXVI (Remote due to COVID-19 pandemic)	2021	New York University and New York Public Library	New York, New York, USA	Sócrates Silva, Columbia U.
LXVII	2022	Biblioteca Nacional de Colombia, Biblioteca Luis Ángel Arango, and Instituto Caro y Cuervo	Bogotá, Colombia	Antonio Sotomayor, University of Illinois Urbana-Champaign
LXVIII	2023	Dumbarton Oaks, Georgetown University, and Library of Congress	Washington, DC, USA	Anne Barnhart, University of West Georgia
LXIX	2024	Tulane University	New Orleans, LA, USA	Christine Hernandez, Tulane University
LXX	2025	New York University, New York Public Library, City University of New York, and Columbia University	New York, NY, USA	David Woken, University of Chicago
LXXI	2026	University of Wisconsin-Madison	Madison, WI, USA	Laura Martin, University of Wisconsin-Madison
LXXII	2027	Instituto Cervantes, the New York City International Book Fair (FILNYC), Residencia de Estudiantes, and the Unión de Editoriales Universitarias Españolas (UNE)	Madrid, Spain	Nelson Santana, CUNY Bronx Community College

*Note: 1st SALALM President elected at 13th conference.

== Purpose ==
SALALM's primary mission revolves around the control and dissemination of bibliographic information about all types of Latin American publications and the development of library collections of Latin Americana in support of educational research. SALALM also promotes cooperative efforts to achieve better library service. SALALM is a forum for the unique challenges of Latin American and Caribbean Studies Librarians and with related professional development. In collaboration with REFORMA, SALALM also provides library materials for the Spanish and Portuguese-speaking populations in the United States. SALALM shares and disseminates the work of its member through an annual conference proceeding.

== Awards and scholarships ==
SALALM currently sponsors a series of Awards and Scholarships including the SALALM Conference Attendance Scholarship, the Dan C. Hazen SALALM Fellowship, Enlace Travel Awards, the José Toribio Medina Award, and the SALALM Award for Institutional Cooperation. SALALM also awards honorary memberships to retired members who have a long record of service to the organization combined with professional achievements.

Since 1986, SALALM has sponsored the Enlace Travel Awards, which provides funding for librarians and information professionals from Latin American and the Caribbean to attend SALALM's annual meetings. To date, the awards have funded conference attendance opportunities from every Spanish-speaking country in the Americas in addition to Brazil, Guyana, Jamaica, Trinidad and Tobago, and the Basque Country in Spain.

Since 2011, SALALM has provided scholarships to students enrolled in ALA-accredited library and information science programs. Originally a general scholarship, the scholarship now funds attendance at the group's annual conference.

== Jose Toribio Medina Award Winners ==
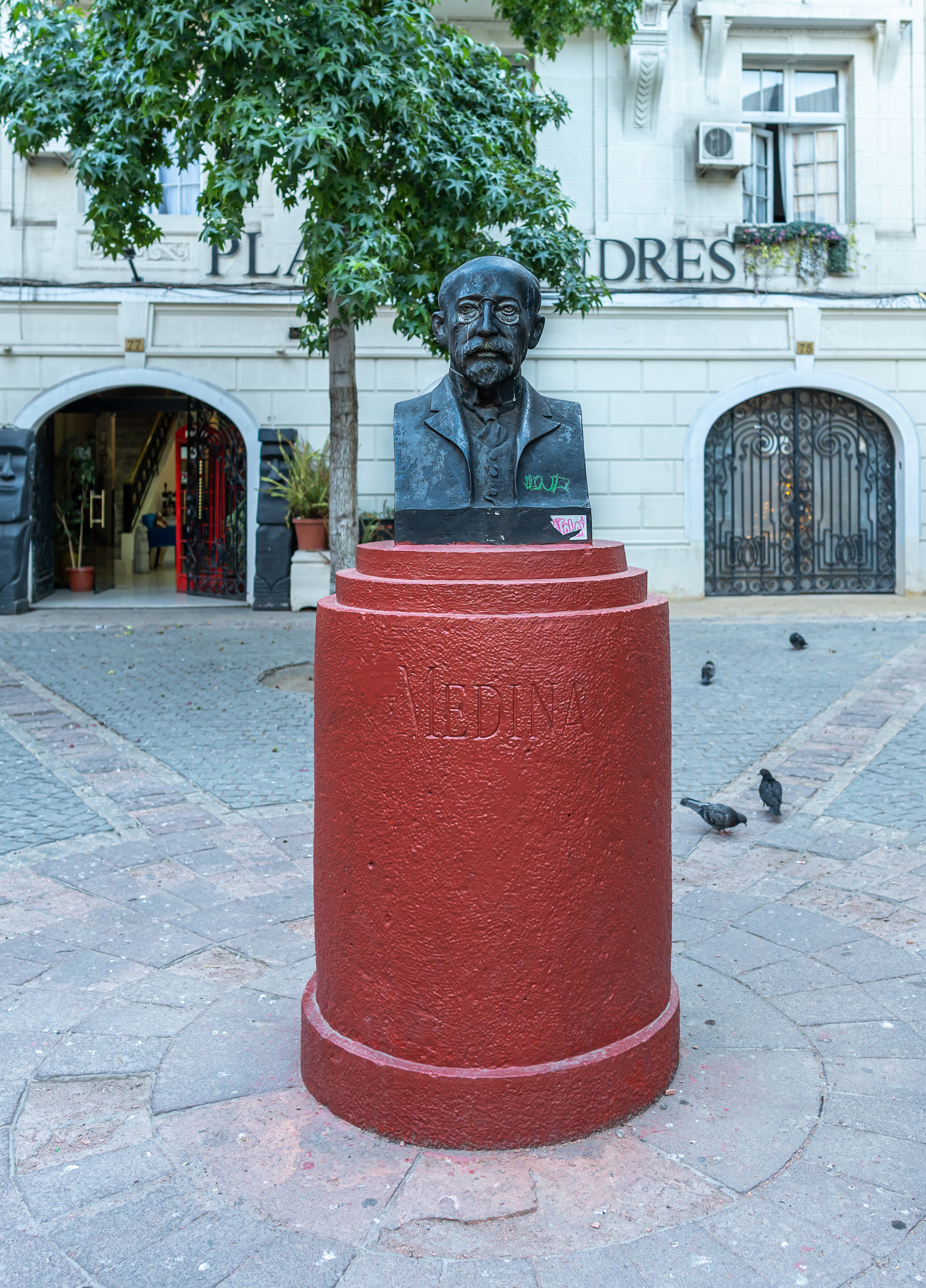
Jose Toribio Medina Monument Santiago, Chile, Plaza Brasil.

SALALM 2025

- Silberberg, Eric. "Teachers’ Reactions to the Bans and Biblioclasm of Mexico’s National Free Textbooks in 2023: A Descriptive Qualitative Study." Diálogos sobre educación. Temas actuales en investigación educativa, vol. 30, no. 15, 2024, doi:10.32870/dse.v0i30.1452

SALALM 2024

- Dyck, Jason, transcription and introduction: Francisco de Florencia. Vidas de los varones ilustres. El tercer volumen de la Historia de la Provincia de la Compañía de Jesús de Nueva España. Mexico: ITESO, Universidad Iberoamericana León and Universidad Iberoamericana, 2023.

SALALM 2023

- Aponte, Sarah. La presencia dominicana en el periódico Las Novedades, 1876-1918: De breve mención a propietarios en la ciudad de Nueva York. Santo Domingo, Dominican Republic; New York: Biblioteca Nacional Pedro Henríquez Ureña; CUNY Dominican Studies Institute.

SALALM Virtual Conference 2022

- Cid Carmona, Víctor. Ciudad Letrada: La Gazeta de México y la difusión de la cultura impresa durante el siglo XVIII. Biblioteca Daniel Cosío Villegas. El Colegio de México.

SALALM 2021

- Gardinier, Lisa and Manuel Ostos. "Spanish-language Print Materials Within Academic Consortia: Assessing the Impact of Resource Sharing in Two Academic Libraries." The Journal of Academic Librarianship 44, no. 2 (March 2018): 295-299.

SALALM Virtual Conference 2020

- Tarragó, Rafael E. The Ignored Contender: A Select Annotated Bibliography of the Cuban Autonomist Party (1878-1898). SALALM Secretariat, The Latin American Library, Tulane University, 2017.

2019 LXIIII Austin, Texas

- Gayle Ann Williams and Jana Lee Krentz, editors. Latin American Collection Concepts: Essays on Libraries, Collaborations, and New Approaches. Jefferson, North Carolina: McFarland & Company, Inc., Publishers, 2019.

2018 LXIII Mexico City, Mexico

- Marisol Ramos, Jennifer Snow & Charles Venator-Santiago. “The Puerto Rican Citizenship Archives Project: A History of the Extension of U.S. Citizenship to Puerto Rico”

2017 LXII, Ann Arbor, MI

- Sotomayor, Antonio. The Sovereign Colony: Olympic Sport, National Identity, and International Politics in Puerto Rico (Lincoln: University of Nebraska Press, 2016).

2016 LXI, Charlottesville, VA

- Urzáiz Rodríguez, Eduardo. 2016. Eugenia : A Fictional Sketch of Future Customs. Edited by Sarah A. Buck Kachaluba and Aaron Dziubinskyj. Critical edition. Madison, Wisconsin: The University of Wisconsin Press.
- Schadl, Suzanne M., and Marina Todeschini. “Cite Globally, Analyze Locally: Citation Analysis from a Local Latin American Studies Perspective”. College & Research Libraries (2014): crl13-442.

2014 LIX, Salt Lake City, Utah

- Sarah Aponte. Autores dominicanos de la diáspora: apuntes bio-bibliográficos (1902-2012) co-authored with Franklin Gutiérrez. (Santo Domingo, Dominican Republic: Biblioteca Nacional Pedro Henríquez Ureña, 2013)

2012 LVII Port of Spain, Trinidad and Tobago

- Molly Molloy. Frontera List for Mexico and Border News. (2009-current)

2009 LIV, Berlin, Germany

- Víctor Federico Torres. Diccionario de Autores puertorriqueños contemporáneos (San Juan, P.R.: Editorial Plaza Mayor, 2009)

2007 LII, Albuquerque, NM

- Cid Carmona, Víctor Julián., and Biblioteca Nacional (Spain). 2004. Repertorio de Impresos Mexicanos En La Biblioteca Nacional de España, Siglos XVI-XVII. 1. ed. México, D.F.: Colegio de México, Biblioteca Daniel Cosío Villegas.

2006 LI, Santo Domingo, DR

- Richard D. Woods. Autobiographical Writings on Mexico: an annotated bibliography of primary sources (Jefferson, NC: McFarland, 2005)

2005 L, Gainesville, FL

- Ana María Cobos. Latin American Studies: an annotated bibliography of core works (Jefferson, NC: McFarland, 2002)

2004 XLIX, Ann Arbor, MI

- Tony A. Harvell. Latin American Dramatists since 1945: a bio-bibliographical guide (Westport, CN: Praeger, 2003)

2003 XLVIII, Cartagena, Colombia

- Torres, Victor F. 2001. Narradores PuertorriqueñOs Del 70 : Guía BiobibliográFica. San Juan, P.R.: Editorial Plaza Mayor.

2002 XLVII, Ithaca, NY

- Gayle Williams. Index Guide to Latin American Journals (Austin, TX: SALALM Secretariat, Benson Latin American Collection. The University of Texas at Austin, 1999)

2001 XLVI, Tempe, AZ

- Iliana Sonntag Blay. Twentieth Century Poetry from Spanish America: An Index to Spanish Language and Bilingual Anthologies (Lanham, Maryland: Scarecrow Press, 1998)

2000 XLV, Long Beach, CA

- Eileen Oliver. Afro-Brazilian Religions: A Selective Bibliography 1990-1997 (Austin, TX.: SALALM Secretariat, Benson Latin American Collection. The University of Texas at Austin, 1998)

1999 XLIV, Nashville, TN

- Cecilia Puerto. Latin American Women Artists, Kahlo and Look Who Else: a selective, annotated bibliography* (Westport, CN: Greenwood Press, 1996)

1998, XLIII, San Juan, PR

Peter A. Stern. Sendero Luminoso:an annotated bibliography of the Shining Path guerrilla movement, 1980-1993 (Albuquerque, NM: SALALM, 1995)

1997, XLII, Rockville, MD

- Barbara Tennenbaum. Encyclopedia of Latin American History and Culture (New York: C Scribner’s Sons, 1996)

1996, XLI, New York

- Library of Congress, Hispanic Division. Handbook of Latin American Studies Compact Disk (Austin: University of Texas Press, 1995)

1995, XL, Athens, GA

- Nelly Sfeir González. Bibliographic Guide to Gabriel García Márquez, 1986-1992 (Westport, CT: Greenwood Press, 1994)

1994, XXXIX, Salt Lake City

- C. Jared Loewenstein. A Descriptive Catalogue of the Jorge Luis Borges Collection in the University of Virginia Library (Charlottesville, VA: University Press of Virginia, 1993)

1993, XXXVIII, Guadalajara

- A. Covington. Latin America and the Caribbean: A Critical Guide to Research Sources(New York: Greenwood Press, 1992)

1992, XXXVII, Austin

- Robert A. McNeil and Barbara G. Valk. Latin American Studies: A Basic Guide to Sources (2d ed., revised and enlarged; Metuchen, New Jersey and London: Scarecrow Press, 1990)

1991, XXXVI, San Diego

- Carole Travis. A Guide to Latin American and Caribbean Census Material: A Bibliography and Union List (London: British Library, 1990)

1990, XXXV, Rio de Janeiro

- Martha Davidson. Picture Collections, Mexico: A Guide to Picture Sources in the United Mexican States (Metuchen: Scarecrow Press, 1988)

And

- Lionel V. Loroña. A Bibliography of Latin American Bibliographies, 1980-1984: Social Sciences and Humanities (Metuchen: Scarecrow Press, 1987)

1989, XXXIV, Charlottesville

- Barbara Valk. Borderline: A Bibliography of the United States-Mexico Borderlands (Los Angeles: UCLA Latin American Center Publications, 1988)

1988, XXXIII, Berkeley

- George F. Elmendorf. Nicaraguan National Bibliography, 1800-1978 (Redlands: Latin American Bibliographic Foundation, 1987)

1987, XXXII, Miami

- Nelly Sfeir González and Margaret E. Fau. Bibliographic Guide to Gabriel García Márquez, 1979-1985(Westport, Conn.: Greenwood Press, 1986)

1986, XXXI, Berlin

Alma Jordan and Barbara Comissiong. The English-speaking Caribbean: A Bibliography of Bibliographies (Boston: G.K. Hall, 1984)

1985, XXX, Princeton

- Werner Guttentag. Bio-bibliografía boliviana (Cochabamba: Los Amigos del Libro, 1975- )

And

- Paula Covington. Indexed Journals: a Guide to Latin American Serials (Madison, WI: Seminar on the Acquisition of Latin American Library Materials, Memorial Library, University of Wisconsin-Madison, 1983)

1984, XXIX, Chapel Hill

- Robin M. Price. An Annotated Catalogue of Medical Americana in the Library of the Wellcome Institute for the History of Medicine: Books and Printed Documents, 1557-1821, from Latin America and the Caribbean Islands and Manuscripts from the Americas, 1575-1927 (London: The Institute, 1983)

1983, XXVIII, Costa Rica

- Dolores Moyano Martin. Handbook of Latin American Studies (Gainesville: University of Florida Press, 1935- )

And

- Sara de Mundo Lo. Index to Spanish American Collective Biography (Boston: G.K. Hall, 1981- )

1982, XXVII, Washington, D.C.

- Barbara Valk. HAPI, Hispanic American Periodical Index (Los Angeles: UCLA Latin American Center Publications, University of California, 1976- )

Multiple people have won the Jose Toribio Medina award more than once: Paula Covington (1985 & 1993), Nelly Sfeir Gonzalez (1987 & 1995), Barbara Valk (1982, 1989 & 1992), Gayle Ann Williams (2002 & 2019).

== Honorary Memberships ==
Name and year elected

Felix Reichman, elected 1970*

Arthur Gropp, elected 1972*

Nettie Lee Benson, elected 1977*

Emma Simonson, elected 1977*

Irene Zimmerman, elected 1977*

Marietta Daniels Shepard, elected 1978*

A. Curtis Wilgus, elected 1980*

Alice Ball, elected 1984

Peter de la Garza, elected 1989

Donald F. Wisdom, elected 1991*

Pauline Collins, elected 1997*

Carl Deal, elected 1997

Suzanne Hodgman, elected 1997*

Rosa Q. Mesa, elected 1997*

Iliana Sonntag, elected 1997*

Laurence Hallewell, elected 1998

Juan Risso, elected 1998

Alma T. Jordan, elected 1999*

Dolores M. Martin, elected 1999*

Jane Garner, elected 2005

Laura Gutiérrez-Witt, elected 2005

Peter Johnson, elected 2005

Barbara Valk, elected 2006*

Robert McNeil, elected 2006*

Ann Hartness, elected 2008

Nelly Sfeir González, elected 2009*

César Rodríguez, elected 2013

Mark Grover, elected 2014

David Block, elected 2015*

Dan Hazen, elected 2015*

Richard Phillips, elected 2015

Scott Van Jacob, elected 2016*

Sonia T.D.G. Silva, elected 2017

Georgette Dorn, elected 2019*

Angela Carreño, elected 2020

Pamela Reguindin, elected 2021

John Wright, elected 2024*

Rafael Tarragó, elected 2024

Laura Shedenhelm, elected 2024

Paula A Convington, elected 2025

Gayle Williams, elected 2025

- deceased

== Additional information ==
As of 2019, SALALM has held 64 annual conferences around the world. The 2020 in-person conference has been postponed because of the COVID-19 crisis but business meetings will be held remotely as scheduled.

SALALM's outreach efforts include an extensive bibliography on Latin American, US Latinx, and Iberian Studies librarianship.

== Affinity groups ==
SALALM has both regional and topical/working groups that function through member participation but are outside of the SALALM organizational structure.

=== Regional groups ===
- LANE is the Latin American North East Libraries Network. LANE is the oldest of the regional groups and includes participants from academic and research libraries.
- LASER is the Latin American Studies Southeast Region.
- MOLLAS stands for the Midwest Organization of Libraries for Latin American Studies.
- CALAFIA is the California Cooperative Latin American Collection Development Group which also includes members from Oregon, Washington, and Utah.

=== Topical/working groups ===
- ALZAR: Academic Latina/o Zone of Activism & Research
- DíScoLA: Digital Scholarship in Latin America. DíScoLA was founded in 2015 during a no-host lunch at Princeton University during the SALALM annual conference for three purposes: to explore what digital scholarship means in Latin American Studies, to build skills and share knowledge about projects, tools and methods within the SALALM community, and to raise SALALM's profile in this emergent area.
- HAPI: Hispanic American Periodicals Index. HAPI evolved out of The SALALM Committee on Bibliography.
- LAIPA: Latin American and Indigenous Peoples of the Americas Subject Authority Cooperative Program Funnel
- LAMP: Latin American Materials Project
- LARRP: Latin Americanist Research Resources Project
- Libreros (book vendors)

== Similar organizations ==
REFORMA is the National Organization to Promote Library & Information Services to Latinos and the Spanish Speaking and is based in Anaheim, CA with 21 chapters. Latin American Studies Association or LASA has over 13,000 members. SALALM members are active in both REFORMA and LASA. The Bolivian Studies Journal was founded by SALALM members.
