= Gunnar Ring Amundsen =

Norwegian engineer and businessperson

Gunnar Ring Amundsen (12 July 1894 – 11 December 1972) was a Norwegian engineer and businessperson.

He was born in Vestre Aker as a son of Axel Amundsen (1856–1939) and Caroline Cathrine Marie Ring (1869–1949). He underwent schooling at Thunes Mekaniske Verksted from 1913 to 1915, then later in Ilmenau, at the Massachusetts Institute of Technology and in Brazil from 1921 to 1922. In 1922 he married Alice Eisenbach, the eldest daughter of Brazilian factory owner Yorge Eisenbach.

In 1922 he was hired at Vulkan Jernstøberi og Mekaniske Verksted. He worked as the chief executive officer of the company from 1939 to 1964. He was also a delegate to the United Nations Economic and Social Council in 1946. He chaired the employers' association Mekaniske verksteders landsforening from 1947 to 1951, having been a board member since 1930, and chaired Støperienes landsforening from 1929 to 1938 and 1946 to 1948. In the national Norwegian Employers' Confederation he was a central board member from 1938 to 1959, then deputy chairman from 1964 to his death. In the national Federation of Norwegian Industries he was a board member from 1937 to 1942 and 1948 to 1952.

He was the chairman of Vulkan from 1939 to his death, of Norges Standardiseringsforbund from 1948 to 1962 (board member since 1931), of Osterhausgates Trevarefabrikk from 1944 to 1957, of Industrikontroll from 1948 to 1965, of Elektrisk Bureau from 1955 to 1965 (board member since 1949), of Norsk Kabelfabrik from 1955 to 1965.

He was decorated as a Knight of the Brazilian Order of the Southern Cross. He died in December 1972 and was buried in Vår Frelsers gravlund.
