= Order of the Southern Cross =

Brazilian order of chivalry

National Order of the Southern Cross
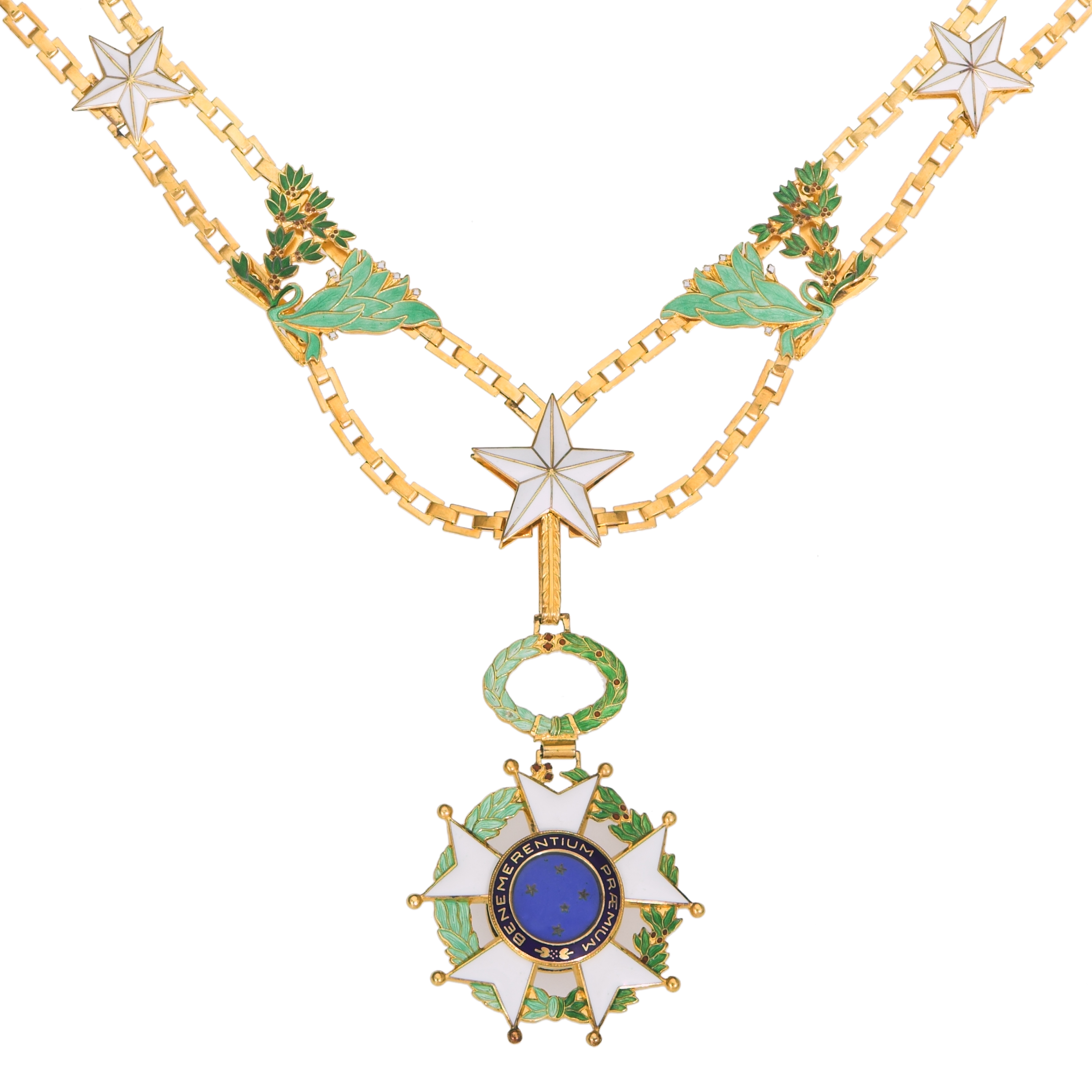
- Grand Collar of the National Order of the Southern Cross

Awarded by the Government of Brazil
- Type: National Order
- Motto: Benemerentium Præmium
- Eligibility: Foreign nationals
- Awarded for: "As a token of gratitude and recognition for those who have rendered significant service to the Brazilian nation."
- Status: Currently awarded
- Founder: Pedro I of Brazil
- Grand Master: The President of Brazil (the national order)
- Chancellor: The Minister of Foreign Affairs
- Grades: Grand Collar; Grand Cross; Grand Officer; Commander; Officer; Knight

Statistics
- First induction: December 1, 1822
- Ribbon bar of the National Order of the Southern Cross

The National Order of the Southern Cross (Portuguese: Ordem Nacional do Cruzeiro do Sul) is a Brazilian order of chivalry and Brazil's main decoration of honour awarded exclusively to foreign nationals.

Founded by Emperor Pedro I on 1 December 1822 and reinstated in its current form by president Getúlio Vargas in 1932, its name derives from the constellation of the Southern Cross, visible from the Southern Hemisphere and in Brazil in particular.

== History ==
Emperor Pedro I of Brazil commissioned the establishment of the Imperial Order of the Cross (Portuguese: Ordem Imperial do Cruzeiro) on the day of his coronation, 1 December 1822. On the same date, the first knights of the order were appointed, to commemorate the crowning of the Empire's first monarch; it was the first Brazilian Order.

After the fall of the monarchy, Brazil's first republican Constitution, enacted on 24 February 1891, abolished all titles of nobility and all Imperial Orders and decorations. The Order was later re-established by the government of Getúlio Vargas on December 5, 1932, as the National Order of the Southern Cross.

During the Old Republic period (from the Proclamation of the Republic until the Revolution of 1930), National Orders did not exist and the Brazilian State bestowed only military medals. Restored in 1932, the Order of the Southern Cross was the first Order to be created in the re-established, republican honours system. It is considered the senior Brazilian National Order.

Just as the Emperor of Brazil was ex officio the Grand Master of the Imperial Order, the Presidents of Brazil is ex officio the Grand Master of the successor National Order. Accordingly, President Luiz Inácio Lula da Silva is the Order's current Grand Master.

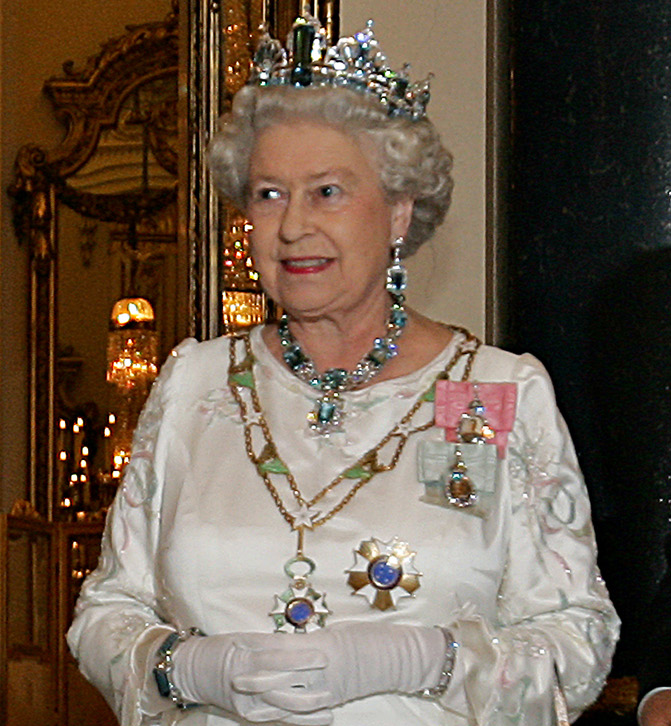
Queen Elizabeth II displays the "Grand Collar" and star of the National Order of the Southern Cross, 2006

== Criteria ==
Unlike the Imperial Order, which was awarded to Brazilians and foreigners alike, the republican National Order is awarded to foreigners only. When the Order was re-established by presidential decree on January 13, 1932, it was restricted to foreigners only, with the stipulation that all awards of the Order constitute an act of foreign relations on the part of the Brazilian Government.

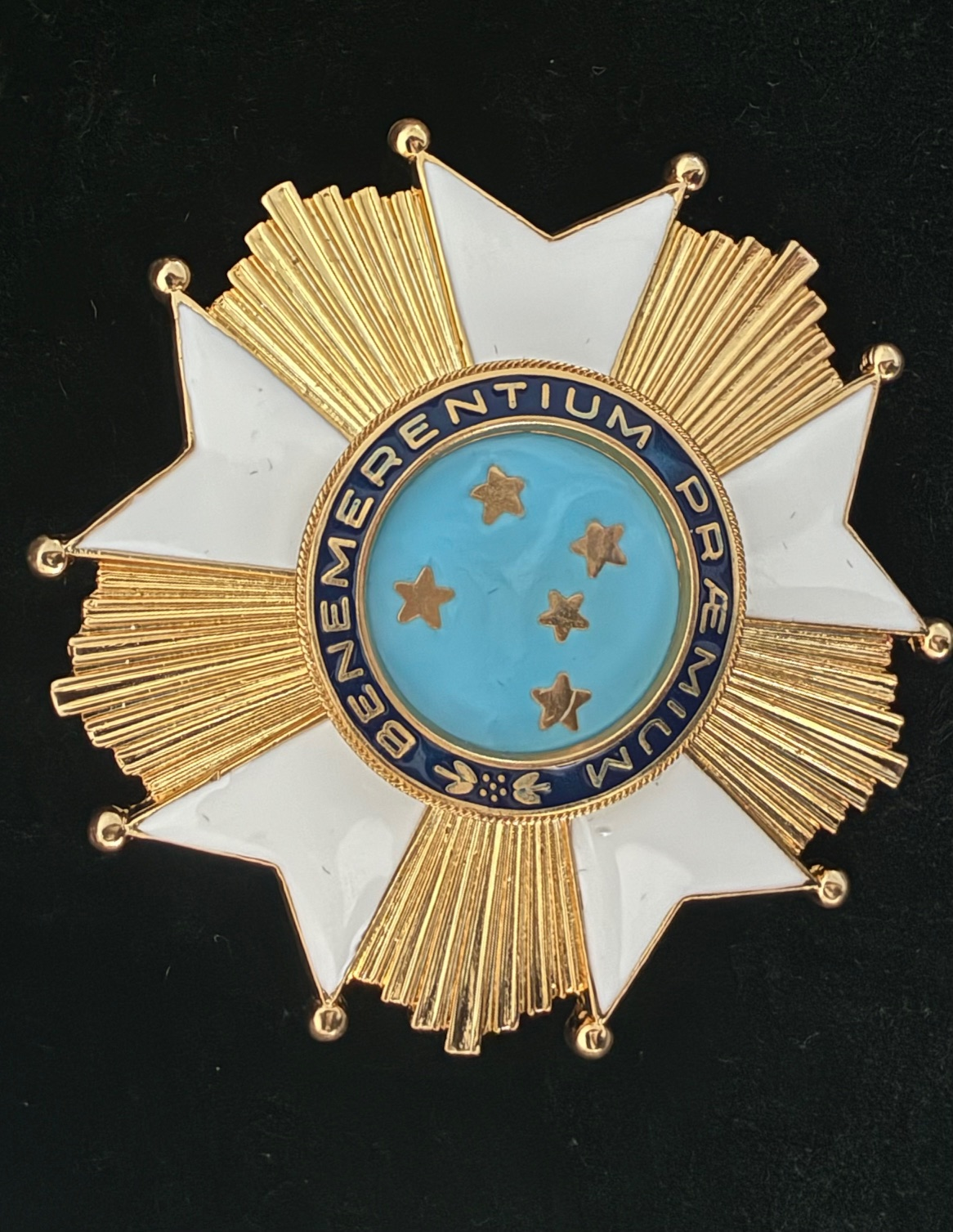
Brazil's National Order of the Southern Cross, portraying the five main stars of the Southern Cross constellation, also known as Crux

Brazilians were excluded deliberately. In the Old Republic, the State regarded Orders and decorations as contrary to the principles of republicanism, and thus maintained no honours system; the creation of an Order that would admit Brazilians to its ranks was a step too far. However, the Brazilian State also resented the lack of a decoration with which to honour foreign dignitaries, as is sometimes almost required by diplomatic protocol. For instance, during the celebrations of the Centennial of Brazilian Independence in 1922, several foreign dignitaries, including the King and Queen of the Belgians, came to Brazil for the celebrations. The King of the Belgians bestowed Belgian honours on some Brazilians. Brazilian nationals needed authorization from the Government to accept foreign titles of honour, or else faced loss of citizenship, and under normal circumstances permission to accept appointment to an Order of Chivalry would not have been granted. While the government of Brazil relaxed its practice and authorized both accepting induction into foreign Orders and the wearing of foreign insignia, it lacked any decorations with which to reciprocate the Belgian gesture. The National Order of the Southern Cross was intended as an Order that would fill that gap. Today, accepting foreign honours and insignia without the need of prior Government approval is allowed, and several Brazilian Orders have been established to which Brazilians may be admitted, starting with the National Order of Merit (Ordem Nacional do Mérito), created in 1946. Even so, the governing statutes of the National Order of the Southern Cross have never been reformed, and it thus remains unavailable to Brazilians. Paradoxically, therefore, the Order's Grand Master — the sitting President of the Republic — is never a member of the Order he or she oversees, and the President's connection with the Order is severed once the President leaves office.

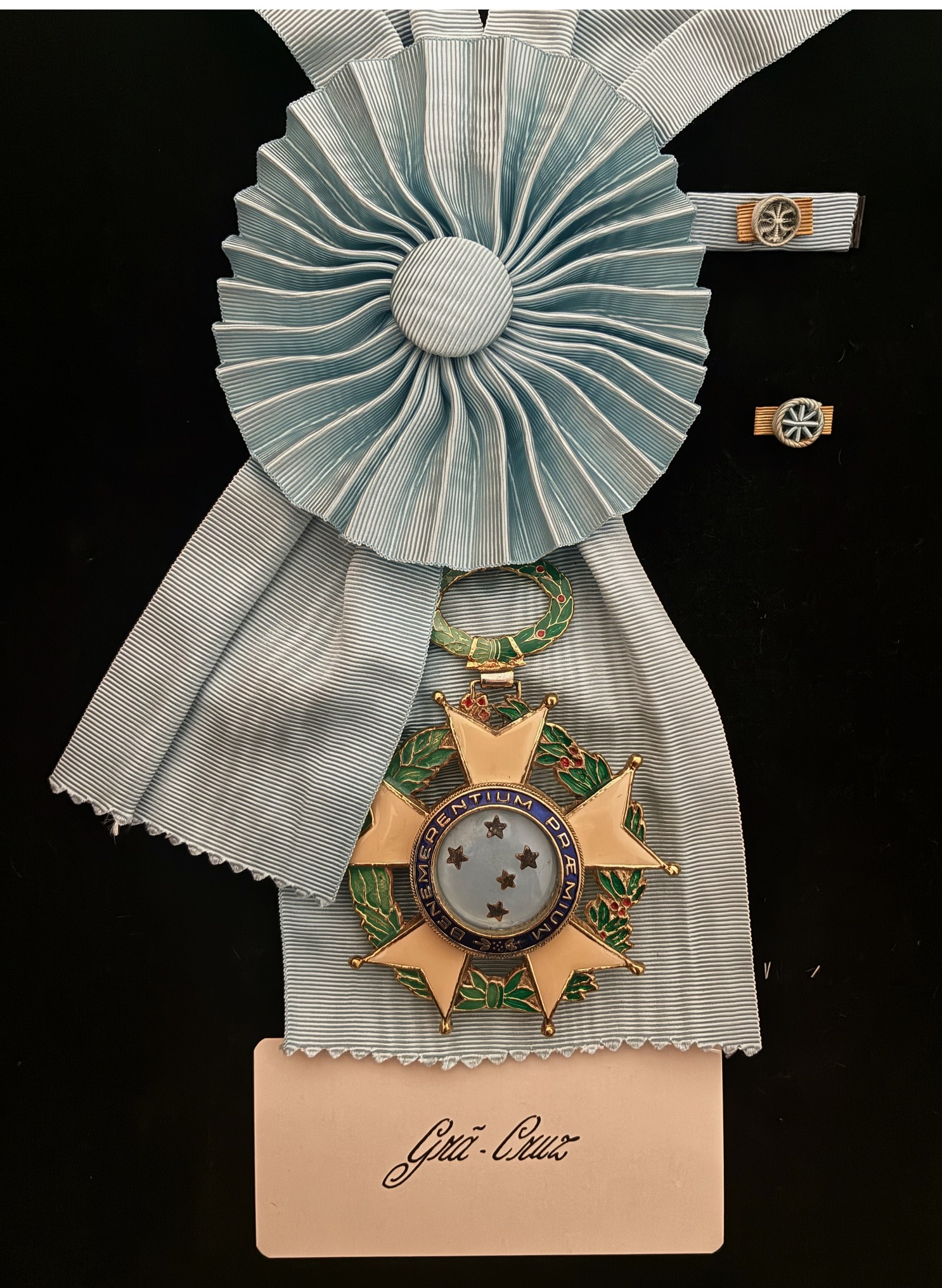
The Grand Cross (second highest level) of Brazil's National Order of the Southern Cross

The Decree that re-created the Order (Decree 22.165, signed by Vargas on 5 December 1932) does not mention the creation of a new Order, but rather the reestablishment of the former Order of the Southern Cross, which had been "created upon the advent of the political independence of Brazil". This was done to improve the prestige of the Order by linking it with the past, that is, by associating it with an Order that had been created more than a century earlier.

In 1932, the republican version of the Order had the same five grades as the old imperial version. In 1939, by a statute issued on 17 July of that year, the additional grade of the Grand Collar was created. Until the creation of the Grand Collar, awards of which are restricted to Heads of State, the Grand Cross was the Order's highest rank.

Awards of, and promotions in, the National Order of the Southern Cross are made by decree of the President of the Republic, in his capacity as the Order's Grand Master. The decree of appointment or promotion is, like all presidential decrees, published in the Federal Government's Official Journal, and, as per the Order's regulations, the appointment or promotion is also recorded in a book kept by the Order's secretary.

The Brazilian Minister of Foreign Affairs (currently Ambassador Mauro Vieira) serves as the Chancellor of the Order, and the diplomat who heads the ceremonial and protocol division of the Ministry serves as the Secretary to the Order. The Order also has a Council, chaired by its Chancellor, that recommends awards and promotions.

== Classes ==
Under its current regulations, the Order consists of the Grand Master and six Classes of members:

Rank	Insignia and notes
Grand Collar (Grande-Colar)	The adorned "Grand Collar", a chain from which the badge of the Order is suspended. The recipient is also allowed to combine the wearing of the Grand Collar with either of the following insignia, or with both: the "Star" of the Order (a plaque modelled after the badge of the Order, to be worn on the left breast); and; the Sash of the Order, that is proper to those of Grand Cross rank (a light blue sash, to be worn on the right shoulder).; Awards of the Grand Collar are restricted to foreign Heads of State.
Grand Cross (Grã-Cruz)	The Sash of the Order, and the badge of the Order hangs from the bottom part of that sash (given that the sash is worn on the right shoulder, the badge hangs close to the left leg, by the waist line). The recipient further wears the "star" of the Order, displayed on the left breast.
Grand Officer (Grande-Oficial)	The badge of the Order around the neck suspended from a blue ribbon necklet, and the star of the Order is displayed on the left breast.
Commander (Comendador)	The badge of the Order around the neck, suspended from a blue ribbon necklet.
Officer (Oficial)	The badge of the Order on the left breast suspended from a ribbon with a rosette.
Knight (Cavaleiro)	The badge of the Order on the left breast suspended from a simple ribbon.

Ribbon bars
Knight	Officer	Commander	Grand Officer	Grand Cross	Grand Collar

== Notable recipients ==
- 2025 – Narendra Modi (Prime Minister of India)
- 2025 – Naruhito (Emperor of Japan)
- 2024 – José Mujica (former President of Uruguay)
- 2024 – Sergio Mattarella (President of Italy)
- 2023 – Marcelo Rebelo de Sousa (President of Portugal)
- 2021 – Hamad Bin Isa Al Khalifa (King of Bahrain)
- 2021 – Tamim bin Hamad Al Thani (Emir of Qatar)
- 2021 – Mohammed bin Zayed Al Nahyan (President of the United Arab Emirates and Ruler of the Emirate of Abu Dhabi)
- 2021 – (United Arab Emirates) Mohammed bin Rashid Al Maktoum (Emir of Dubai)
- 2021 – Khalifa bin Zayed Al Nahyan (President of the United Arab Emirates)
- 2021 – Iván Duque (President of Colombia)
- 2020 – Taro Aso (Prime Minister of Japan)
- 2020 – Shinzo Abe (Prime Minister of Japan)
- 2018 – Benjamin Netanyahu (Prime Minister of Israel)
- 2017 – (Japan) Okada Kōō (Spiritual leader of Sukyo Mahikari)
- 2017 – Horacio Cartes (President of Paraguay)
- 2017 – (Austria) Stefan Zweig (novelist, playwright, journalist and biographer), posthumous award
- 2017 – Mauricio Macri (President of Argentina)
- 2016 – Rosen Plevneliev (President of Bulgaria)
- 2015 – Cristina Fernández de Kirchner (President of Argentina)
- 2015 – Enrique Peña Nieto (President of Mexico)
- 2014 – (Argentina) Julio de Vido (politician)
- 2013 – (Venezuela) José Antonio Abreu (pianist)
- 2012 – Emmanuel Macron (later President of France)
- 2011 – Georgi Parvanov (President of Bulgaria)
- 2011 – María Ángela Holguín (Minister of Foreign Affairs of Colombia)
- 2010 – Bashar al-Assad (President of Syria)
- 2010 – Michel Suleiman (President of Lebanon)
- 2009 – Nicolas Sarkozy (President of France)
- 2009 – (United States) Arturo Valenzuela (Assistant Secretary of State for Western Hemisphere Affairs)
- 2007 – Anders Fogh Rasmussen (Prime Minister of Denmark)
- 2007 – Carl XVI Gustaf (King of Sweden)
- 2007 – Silvia Sommerlath (Queen consort of Sweden)
- 2007 – Henri (Grand Duke of Luxembourg)
- 2007 – Maria Teresa (Grand Duchess consort of Luxembourg)
- 2006 – (Senegal) Jacques Diouf (diplomat)
- 2004 – (United States) James Sherwood (businessman)
- 2004 – Mohammed VI (King of Morocco)
- 2003 – Beatrix (Queen of the Netherlands)
- 2003 – Harald V (King of Norway)
- 2003 – Sonja Haraldsen (Queen consort of Norway)
- 2003 – (Japan) Yasuo Tanaka (governor of Nagano)
- 2003 – (United States) Ann Hartness (scholar)
- 2002 – Ismael Crespo (Professor at the University of Murcia, Murcia, Spain)
- 2002 – Aleksander Kwaśniewski (President of Poland)
- 1999 – Alberto Fujimori (President of Peru)
- 1999 – (United States) Albert Fishlow (professor)
- 1999 – (Italy) Giovanni Sartori (political scientist)
- 1998 – (Portugal) Ricardo Salgado (banker)
- 1998 – (Spain) Manuel Fraga (president of Galicia)
- 1996 – Jacques Chirac (President of France)
- 1996 – António Guterres (Prime Minister of Portugal)
- 1996 – (Switzerland) Stephan Schmidheiny (entrepreneur)
- 1995 – Ronald Venetiaan (President of Suriname)
- 1991 – Sofía of Spain (Queen consort of Spain)
- 1991 – Juan Carlos I (King of Spain)
- 1990 – (Czech Republic) Václav Havel (President of Czechoslovakia)
- 1990 – (Japan) Daisaku Ikeda (president of the Soka Gakkai)
- 1987 – Mário Soares (President of Portugal)
- 1984 – Kiyoshi Sumiya (Ambassador of Japan)
- 1978 – Charles, Prince of Wales (later Charles III, King of the United Kingdom and the other Commonwealth realms)
- 1976 – Masayoshi Ōhira (Finance Minister of Japan)
- 1976 – Valéry Giscard d'Estaing (President of France)
- 1975 – Nicolae Ceausescu (President of Romania)
- 1974 – Margrethe II (Queen of Denmark)
- 1972 – Hugo Banzer (President of Bolivia)
- 1972 – (Kingdom of Yugoslavia) Alexander II Karađorđević (Crown Prince of Yugoslavia)
- 1969 – (United States) Neil Armstrong (astronaut)
- 1969 – (United States) Michael Collins (astronaut)
- 1968 – Elizabeth II (Queen of the United Kingdom and the other Commonwealth realms)
- 1965 – (United States) Jeanne Behrend (pianist, musicologist, educator, and composer)
- 1965 – Mohammad Reza Pahlavi (Shah of Iran)
- 1964 – Charles de Gaulle (President of France)
- 1964 – (United States) Felix Grant (radio presenter)
- 1963 – (Socialist Federal Republic of Yugoslavia) Blaže Koneski (writer)
- 1963 – (Socialist Federal Republic of Yugoslavia) Ivan Rukavina (Army general)
- 1963 – (Socialist Federal Republic of Yugoslavia) Josip Broz Tito (President of Yugoslavia)
- 1962 – (United Kingdom) Prince Philip, Duke of Edinburgh (consort of the British monarch)
- 1961 – (Cuba) Che Guevara (revolutionary)
- 1961 – (Soviet Union) Yuri Gagarin (cosmonaut)
- 1960 – Sarit Thanarat (Prime Minister of Thailand)
- 1960 – Bhumibol Adulyadej (King of Thailand)
- 1959 – Nobusuke Kishi (Prime Minister of Japan)
- 1958 – Haile Selassie (Emperor of Ethiopia)
- 1956 – (United States) David Rockefeller (banker)
- 1956 – Sukarno (President of Indonesia)
- 1955 – Hirohito (Emperor of Japan)
- 1954 – Dwight D. Eisenhower (Supreme Commander WWII, President of the United States)
- 1954 – Vera Weizmann (wife of Chaim Weizmann, the first President of Israel)
- 1952 – (United States) Helen Keller (activist)
- 1952 – Eva Perón (First Lady of Argentina)
- 1946 – (United States) Nelson Rockefeller (as Assistant Secretary of State for American Republic Affairs, later U.S. Vice President)
- 1944 – (United States) Charles Lyon Chandler (historian)
- 1944 – (Republic of China (1912–1949)) Chiang Kai-shek (Chairman of the National Government of China)
- 1944 – Ira C. Eaker (general of the United States Army Air Forces)
- 1944 – (United States) Douglas Fairbanks Jr. (Naval officer)
- 1940 – Eleazar López Contreras (President of Venezuela)
- 1940 – (United States) Robert B. Williams (pilot)
- 1940 – (Netherlands) Conrad Carel Käyser (Marine officer and explorer)
- 1938 – Germán Busch (President of Bolivia)
- 1935 – (New Zealand) Jean Batten (aviator)
- 1933 – Edward, Prince of Wales (later Edward VIII, King of the United Kingdom and the British Dominions, Emperor of India, and Duke of Windsor)

=== Cities ===
- 2016 – (Colombia) Medellín (Honorable support due LaMia Flight 2933 accident)

Recipients by class
* Grand Collars
  - Emperor Akihito
  - Bashar al-Assad
  - Beatrix of the Netherlands
  - Andrew Bertie
  - Felipe Calderón
  - Carl XVI Gustaf
  - Jacques Chirac
  - Francesco Cossiga
  - Queen Elizabeth II
  - Charles de Gaulle
  - Valéry Giscard d'Estaing
  - Haile Selassie
  - Harald V of Norway
  - Václav Havel
  - Henri, Grand Duke of Luxembourg
  - Theodor Heuss
  - Juan Carlos I of Spain
  - Juliana of the Netherlands
  - Aleksander Kwaśniewski
  - Mauricio Macri
  - Margrethe II of Denmark
  - Mohammed VI of Morocco
  - Mohammad Reza Pahlavi
  - Narendra Modi
  - José Mujica
  - Enrique Peña Nieto
  - Rosen Plevneliev
  - Mário Soares
  - Ronald Venetiaan
- Grand Crosses
  - Amha Selassie
  - Henry H. Arnold
  - Jan Peter Balkenende
  - Baudouin of Belgium
  - Prince Oscar Bernadotte
  - Prince Bernhard of Lippe-Biesterfeld
  - Maria Cavaco Silva
  - Charles, Prince of Wales
  - Carlo Azeglio Ciampi
  - Rohan Daluwatte
  - Aida Desta
  - Fernando de Quintanilha e Mendonça Dias
  - Jacques Diouf
  - Edward VIII
  - Dwight D. Eisenhower
  - Cristina Fernández de Kirchner
  - Wacław Frankowski
  - Frederik, Crown Prince of Denmark
  - Che Guevara
  - Gustaf V
  - Gustaf VI Adolf
  - António Guterres
  - Haakon, Crown Prince of Norway
  - Walter Hallstein
  - Tarja Halonen
  - Sir Arthur Harris
  - Henri, Grand Duke of Luxembourg
  - Henrik, Prince Consort of Denmark
  - Hirohito
  - Ja'afar of Negeri Sembilan
  - Prince Joachim of Denmark
  - Jacek Junosza-Kisielewski
  - Thanat Khoman
  - Knud, Hereditary Prince of Denmark
  - François Lefebvre de Laboulaye
  - Curtis LeMay
  - Charles de Limburg Stirum
  - Erling Lorentzen
  - Luiz Inácio Lula da Silva
  - Maria Teresa, Grand Duchess of Luxembourg
  - Princess Marina of Greece and Denmark
  - Mary, Crown Princess of Denmark
  - Queen Máxima of the Netherlands
  - Mette-Marit, Crown Princess of Norway
  - Oscar II
  - Georgi Parvanov
  - Eva Perón
  - Friis Arne Petersen
  - Prince Philip, Duke of Edinburgh
  - Józef Piłsudski
  - Francisco Pinto Balsemão
  - Princess Ragnhild, Mrs. Lorentzen
  - Anders Fogh Rasmussen
  - Nicolas Sarkozy
  - Queen Silvia of Sweden
  - Queen Sofía of Spain
  - Queen Sonja of Norway
  - Sukarno
  - Jan Szembek (diplomat)
  - Sarit Thanarat
  - Frans Timmermans
  - Josip Broz Tito
  - Umberto Vattani
  - Victoria, Crown Princess of Sweden
  - Wilhelmina of the Netherlands
  - Elmo Zumwalt
- Grand Officers
  - Mark W. Clark
  - Ira C. Eaker
  - Tim Fischer
  - Wallace M. Greene
  - Emmanuel Macron
  - William R. Munroe
  - Henry Conger Pratt
  - Benoît Puga
  - Kiyoshi Sumiya
- Commanders
  - Howard H. J. Benson
  - Asa White Kenney Billings
  - James H. Billington
  - Hélène Carrère d'Encausse
  - Charles Lyon Chandler
  - Chiang Kai-shek
  - Ismael Crespo
  - Duarte de Freitas do Amaral
  - Jean-Louis Georgelin
  - Ann Hartness
  - Henry Kent Hewitt
  - Daisaku Ikeda
  - Claude Lévi-Strauss
  - Charles P. Mason
  - Ghillean Prance
  - Dorrit Reventlow
  - David Rockefeller
  - Dominique Vian
- Officers
  - Jean Batten
  - Jérôme Champagne
  - Douglas Fairbanks Jr.
  - Robert Olds
  - Jean-François Revel
- Knights
  - Gunnar Ring Amundsen
  - Harold L. George
  - Peter Ustinov
- Unknown Class
  - José Antonio Abreu
  - Konrad Adenauer
  - Bhumibol Adulyadej
  - Alexander, Crown Prince of Yugoslavia
  - Neil Armstrong
  - Arie Aroch
  - Hugo Banzer
  - José Luís Mena Barreto
  - Beatrix of the Netherlands
  - Jeanne Behrend
  - Juan Carlos I
  - Horacio Cartes
  - Nicolae Ceaușescu
  - Charles, Prince of Wales
  - Michael Collins (astronaut)
  - Eleazar López Contreras
  - Gabriel P. Disosway
  - Louis Dreller
  - Elizabeth II
  - Albert Fishlow
  - Alberto Fujimori
  - Yuri Gagarin
  - Felix Grant
  - Tarja Halonen
  - María Ángela Holguín
  - António Horta-Osório (banker)
  - Jonas H. Ingram
  - Helen Keller
  - Blaže Koneski
  - City of Medellín
  - Benjamin Netanyahu
  - Masayoshi Ōhira
  - Prince Philip, Duke of Edinburgh
  - William Alfred Pickwoad
  - Juan Rivero Torres
  - Nelson Rockefeller
  - Ivan Rukavina
  - Ricardo Salgado
  - Giovanni Sartori
  - Stephan Schmidheiny
  - James Sherwood
  - Stanisław Skarżyński
  - Queen Sofía of Spain
  - Maurice Strong
  - Michel Suleiman
  - Yasuo Tanaka (politician)
  - Shoichiro Toyoda
  - Arturo Valenzuela
  - Julio de Vido
  - Lech Wałęsa
  - Vera Weizmann
  - Robert B. Williams (general)
  - Stefan Zweig
