= Louis Dreller =

American sailor and engineer (1897–1970)

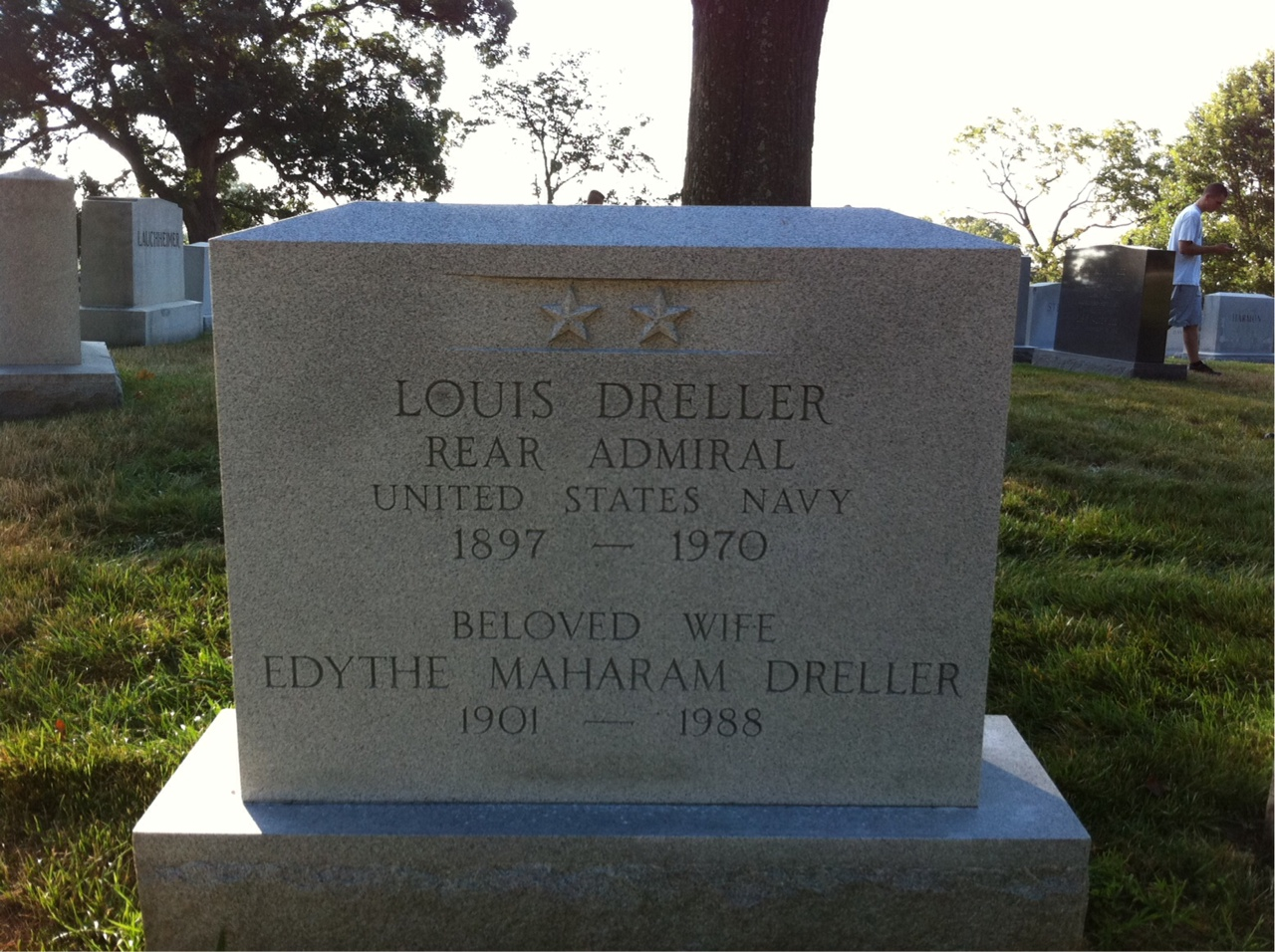
- Grave at Arlington National Cemetery
- Born: March 6, 1897; Portsmouth, New Hampshire, U.S.
- Died: May 8, 1970 (aged 73); Bethesda, Maryland, U.S.
- Burial place: Arlington National Cemetery (Section 5, Site 4)
- Military career
- Allegiance: United States
- Branch: United States Navy
- Service years: 1918–1951
- Rank: Rear Admiral
- Awards: Legion of Merit (United States); Order of the Southern Cross (Brazil)

Louis Dreller (March 6, 1897 – May 8, 1970) was an American sailor and engineer. He served in the United States Navy from 1918 to 1951, rising to the rank of Rear Admiral.

Dreller was commissioned in 1918 as an engineering duty officer during World War I. For much of World War II, he was stationed for several years at the Philadelphia Navy Yard, working on designing and building ships for the war effort. For his efforts there he was awarded the Legion of Merit by the United States and the Order of the Southern Cross by Brazil. After the war, he served as Commander of the U.S. Navy Yard at Pearl Harbor.

Dreller was president of the American Society of Naval Engineers in 1951.

== Personal life ==
Louis Dreller (who was Jewish) was born March 6, 1897, in Portsmouth, New Hampshire. In 1918, he graduated from the University of New Hampshire with a degree in electrical engineering. He later earned a master's degree from Columbia University. He married Edythe Maharam. They had two daughters, Rusty (Selma) Kerr and Doris Sosin. He died May 8, 1970, at Bethesda Naval Hospital, and was buried in Arlington National Cemetery.

== Career ==
Upon graduating from the University of New Hampshire in 1918, Dreller was commissioned in the United States Navy as an ensign, initially for engineering duty only. During World War I, he received a temporary promotion to Lieutenant junior grade. He was commissioned in that rank on July 1, 1920.

During his service in the Navy, Dreller served aboard the USS South Carolina, USS Michigan, USS Preston, USS Tingey, USS Arizona, USS Lexington, USS Ranger, USS Argonne, and USS Indianapolis. Aboard these last two vessels, he was Base Force Engineering Officer and later Scouting Force Engineering Officer. He was a plankowner for the Lexington and the Ranger. He also served several tours with the Bureau of Engineering.

Dreller was serving aboard the Indianapolis on December 7, 1941, when the Imperial Japanese Navy attacked Pearl Harbor. The Indianapolis was assigned to Pearl Harbor but was spared because it was out of port on an exercise at the time of the attack. The United States entered World War II the following day. At the time, Dreller was Force Engineering Officer with the Scouting Force. In 1942, he served briefly on the staff of the Commander Amphibious Force, Pacific, before being transferred in August of that year to the Philadelphia Navy Yard. He served the remainder of the war there working on the design and production of warships, holding at different times the roles of Design Superintendent, Planning Officer, and Production Officer. He was promoted to rear admiral on July 14, 1943.

Dreller received the Legion of Merit for his work in the Navy Yard. Also, Brazil awarded him the Order of the Southern Cross for his contributions in designing destroyers for the Brazilian Navy while serving in the Philadelphia Navy Yard. His other decorations included the (World War I) Victory Medal, the American Defense Service Medal, the Asiatic–Pacific Campaign Medal, the American Campaign Medal, and the World War II Victory Medal.

After World War II, Dreller served again at Pearl Harbor, in the office of the Naval Inspector General, as Assistant Chief of Naval Material, and as Commander of the U.S. Naval Shipyard. He retired from the Navy on July 1, 1951, due to disability.

Dreller joined the American Society of Naval Engineers in 1920. He served as the society's president in 1951. He remained active in the society until falling ill before his death in 1970.

== Publications ==
- Dreller, Louis (May 1933). "Basis and method of determining A. C. cable sizes". Naval Engineers Journal. 45 (2): 165–172. doi:10.1111/j.1559-3584.1933.tb02696.x.
- Dreller, Louis (August 1, 1937). "The fundamentals of parallel operation of direct and alternating current generators". Journal of the American Society of Naval Engineers. 49 (3): 273–306. doi:10.1111/j.1559-3584.1937.tb02580.x.
- Dreller, Louis (July 1940). "Electricity in the United States Navy". Electrical Engineering. 59 (7): 267–270. doi:10.1109/EE.1940.6434985. S2CID 51661596.
