= Latin America North East Libraries Network =

Organization of library professionals

LANE
- Latin America North East Libraries Network
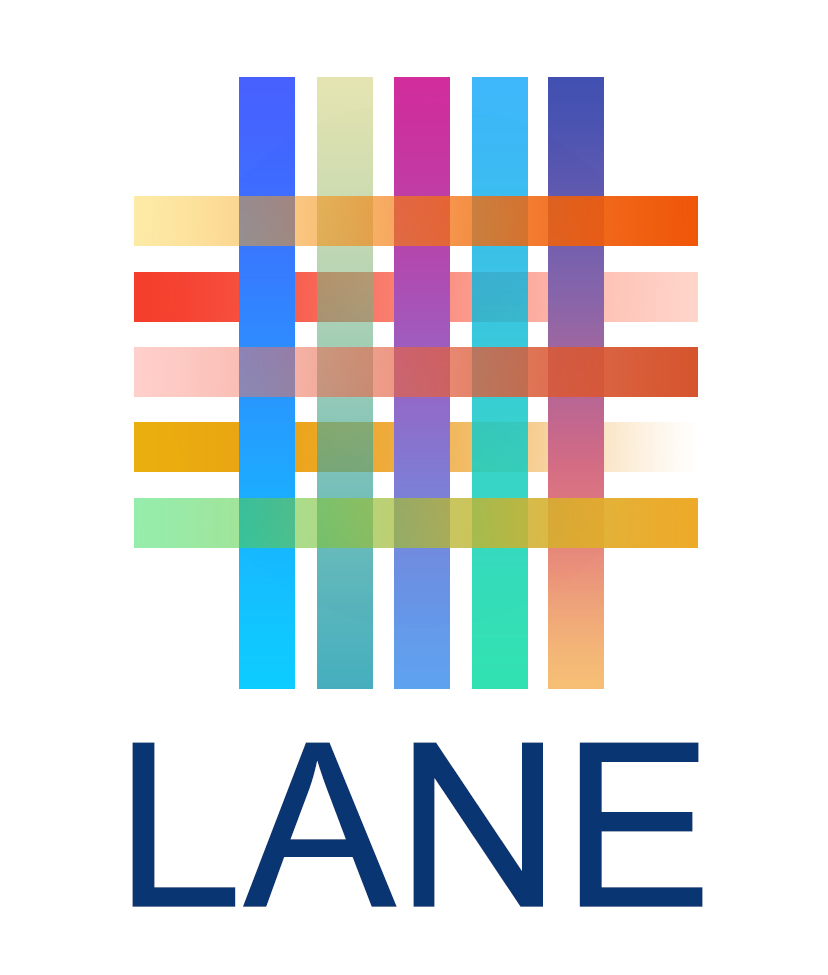
- Formation: 1993; 33 years ago
- Co-Chair: Nelson Santana
- Co-Chair: Alyson Williams
- Affiliations: Seminar on the Acquisition of Latin American Library Materials (SALALM)
- Website: https://salalm.org/lane

The Latin America North East Libraries Network (LANE) is an organization of library professionals representing academic and research libraries based mainly in the northeastern United States who are committed to supporting research, teaching, and learning in Latin American, Caribbean, Iberian, and Latinx Studies. LANE is a regional affinity group of the Seminar on the Acquisition of Latin American Library Materials (SALALM). The goals and the structure of the organization are detailed in its Statement of Purpose page.

The LANE members come from academic libraries from both private and public universities;research libraries including the Hispanic Division of the Library of Congress and a few members from the UK, Spain, and Germany.

Along with LANE, other regional affinity groups associated with the Seminar on the Acquisition of Latin American Library Materials (SALALM) are: Latin American Studies Southeast Regional Libraries (LASER), Midwest Organization of Libraries for Latin American Studies (MOLLAS), and the California Cooperative Latin American Collection Development Group (Calafia).

== History ==
LANE was created in 1993. The group initially started from the expansion of the "New York-METRO, a long-standing cooperative group of four institutions in the New York Metropolitan area. In the Fall of 2022, the name of this organization was changed from Latin America North East Libraries Consortium to Latin America North East Libraries Network.

=== Chairs ===
Name	Institution	Years
Denise Hibay	New York Public Library	1993-2000
Fernando Acosta-Rodríguez	New York Public Library	2000-2003
Lynn Shirey	Harvard University	2003-2005
Patricia Figueroa	Brown University	2005-2007
Martha Mantilla	University of Pittsburgh	2007-2010
Melissa Gasparotto	Rutgers University	2011-2014
Michael Scott	Georgetown University	2014-2016
Jill Baron	Dartmouth College	2016-2019*
Talía Guzmán-González	Library of Congress. Hispanic Reading Room	2019-2020
Jesús Alonso-Regalado	University at Albany, State University of New York	2020-2023
Alyson Williams	Library of Congress	2023-2026
Nelson Santana	Bronx Community College	2023-2026
Brie Gettleson	University of Pennsylvania	2026-2029

*Jana Krentz served as the Chair in the Fall 2017 meeting.

== Latin American, Caribbean, U.S. Latinx, and Iberian Free Online Resources (LACLI) ==
LACLI is an international collaborative project spearheaded by LANE. Its collaborating institutions are: Centro de Pesquisa e Documentação de História Contemporânea do Brasil, a center part of the Fundação Getulio Vargas; and the Biblioteca Daniel Cosío Villegas of the El Colegio de México. LACLI provides access to online e-resources with Latin American, Caribbean, U.S. Latinx, and Iberian full content. LACLI is considered "an invaluable tool for locating e-resources on various topics in full text." It is licensed under a Creative Commons Attribution-NonCommercial-ShareAlike 4.0 international License. Anyone can contribute to this project by nominating a free e-resource to add to LACLI. It was launched in 2020 in response to the demand for e-resources for teaching, research and learning during the COVID-19 pandemic. This project was recognized with the SALALM Award for Institutional Collaborative Initiatives in 2022, the Best DH Dataset of the 2023 Digital Humanities Awards and the Best Public Project of the Archives, Libraries, and Digital Scholarship Section of the Latin American Studies Association (LASA) in 2024. According to the LibGuides Community website, it has been included in more than 100 LibGuide pages (as of 7 March 2023). LACLI has been also been featured in prominent blogs such as Universo Abierto. Students worldwide have participated in this project.

== Additional LANE Initiatives ==
- Webinar series titled LANE in Europe, Europe in LANE was launched in 2022. This initiative aims at familiarizing with the collections related to Latin America,the Caribbean,and Iberia in European institutions that are part of LANE. Also learning about any distinctive Latin American collections in their countries. These webinars are available via LANE's youtube channel.
- Brazilian Presidential Transition 2018 web archive comprising Brazilian government websites in the areas of human rights, the environment, LGBTQ issues, and culture, for the period following the election of Jair Bolsonaro as president of Brazil on October 28, 2018, up to his inauguration on January 1, 2019. The collection targets web content considered to be vulnerable due to the anticipated consolidation or elimination in the aforementioned areas, and represents a snapshot of government content before Bolsonaro took office, with the aim of preserving these important, but potentially ephemeral, documents for researchers and scholars. Coordinated by LANE chair Jill Baron and LANE members Sócrates Silva and Talía Guzmán-González, with the help of LANE members Archive-It collection
- Report titled Latin American & Iberian Collections at LANE institutions: 1999-2009 and authored by LANE member Miguel Valladares (University of Virginia. Formerly, at Dartmouth University)
