= Ann Hartness =

American librarian

Ann Hartness (born March 11, 1936) is an academic research librarian who was Head Librarian of the University of Texas (UT) Nettie Lee Benson Latin American Collection from 2002 to 2008. The library, established in 1926, is the largest dedicated to Latin America in the United States, and is part of the Perry–Castañeda Library, the country's fifth-largest academic library.

Retired in 2008, Hartness was a member of the first broad generation of women to rise to professional academic leadership positions in the US. Hartness worked for 38 years at UT Austin, beginning as a serials cataloger in 1970. Her assistance has been acknowledged in original research by numerous scholars in the humanities and social sciences.

Hartness' focus on Brazil and collecting trips there helped make the UT library a global resource for study of that country. In 2003, Brazil named her a Commander of the National Order of the Southern Cross, the highest honor granted by that country to non-Brazilians.

Hartness also directed the United States Library of Congress field office in Brazil in 1989–90. In March 2022, the University of Texas renamed the main reading room at the Benson Latin American Collection the Ann Hartness Reading Room.

== Biography ==
Hartness has been active since the 1970s in the permanent Seminar on the Acquisition of Latin American Library Materials (SALALM), a nationwide collaborative effort among research libraries, founded in 1956. She was elected Honorary Member of the SALALM board of directors (Secretariat) in 2008.

In 1972–73, while an intern at Brazil's National Library in Rio de Janeiro, Hartness began compiling an index for researchers of the statistics provided during the 19th century in annual reports by the governors ("presidents") of the 20 provinces of the then Brazilian Empire. The work spanned 59 years of reports, from 1830 to 1889.

This led to a comprehensive published guide for scholars, the 1977 Subject Guide to Statistics in the Presidential Reports of the Brazilian Provinces, 1830–1889, published by the Institute for Latin American Studies at the University of Texas. This later became an interactive online guide.

Hartness's published works also include a review of reference books since 1965 concerning Brazil, first published in English in 1990 and updated in Portuguese in 1999 (see list of published works). While much of Hartness's work has focused on Brazil, she also published in 1995 a guide to political street literature in Guatemala during the early Cold War: Revolution and Counterrevolution in Guatemala, 1944–1963.

A recurrent theme in her collecting and cataloging work has been material not available from commercial publishing houses, such as publications of government agencies, which she has described as "excellent but poorly publicized reference sources." From annual collecting trips across Brazil, Hartness brought back tens of thousands of volumes to Austin, much of it collected from such state, local, and federal agencies. Another focus has been "ephemera," that is pamphlets, booklets, and other written material of interest to researchers but produced by unions, churches, political parties, etc., and so rarely made available in libraries.

Hartness was a pioneer in the micro-filming of Latin American library materials, in an effort to increase the efficiency of academic research in the field.

== Published works, as author or editor ==
- Subject Guide to Statistics in the Presidential Reports of the Brazilian Provinces, 1830–1889, Institute of Latin American Studies, The University of Texas at Austin, 1977
- Latin American in English-Language Reference Books: a selected, annotated bibliography, Special Libraries Association, 1981
- Governments as Publishers of Reference Materials: Mexico and Brazil, 1970–1980, Institute of Latin American Studies, University of Texas, 1982
- "Social Science Bibliographies on Latin America," in: Latin American Research Review, Vol. 20, No. 1, The Latin American Studies Association, University of Texas, 1985
- Brazil in Reference Books: an annotated bibliography, 1965–1989, Metuchen: The Scarecrow Press, 1991 ISBN 0-8108-2400-0
- Continuity and Change in Brazil and the Southern Cone: research trends and library collections for the year 2000 = Continuidade e mudanȧs no Brasil e no Cone Sul tendéncias de pesquisa e acervos bibliográficos para o ano 2000: papers of the thirty-fifth Annual Meeting of the Seminar on the Acquisition of Latin American Materials, Hotel Meridien Copacabana, Rio de Janeiro, Brazil, June 3–8, 1990; [co-sponsored by] Fundação Gétulio Vargas, Rio de Janeiro and the Library of Congress Office, Rio de Janeiro; Ann Hartness, editor. Albuquerque, N.M.: SALALM Secretariat, General Library, University of New Mexico, 1992
- "Continuity and Change in Brazil," Seminar on the Acquisition of Latin American Library Materials XXXV, 1992 (paper included in previous publication)
- "Introductory essay on bibliographies and general works", Handbook of Latin American Studies, Vol. 53, Library of Congress, 1994.
- Revolution and Counterrevolution in Guatemala, 1944–1963: an annotated guide to street literature in the Benson Latin American Collection, The General Libraries, University of Texas at Austin, 1995
- Brasil: Obras de Referência 1965–1998, uma bibliografia comentada, Briquet de Lemos Livros, 1999
- "Brasiliana nos Estados Unidos: fontes de referência e documentação" in O Brasil dos Brasilianistas: um guia dos estudos sobre o Brasil nos Estados Unidos, 1945–2000, edited by Rubens Antônio Barbosa, Marshall C. Eakin and Paulo Roberto de Almeida, Paz e Terra, 2002
- "Brasiliana in the United States: reference sources and documents," in Envisioning Brazil: a guide to Brazilian studies in the United States, edited by Marshall C. Eakin and Paulo Roberto de Almeida, Madison: The University of Wisconsin Press, 2002
