= Ismael Crespo =

Ismael Crespo Martínez
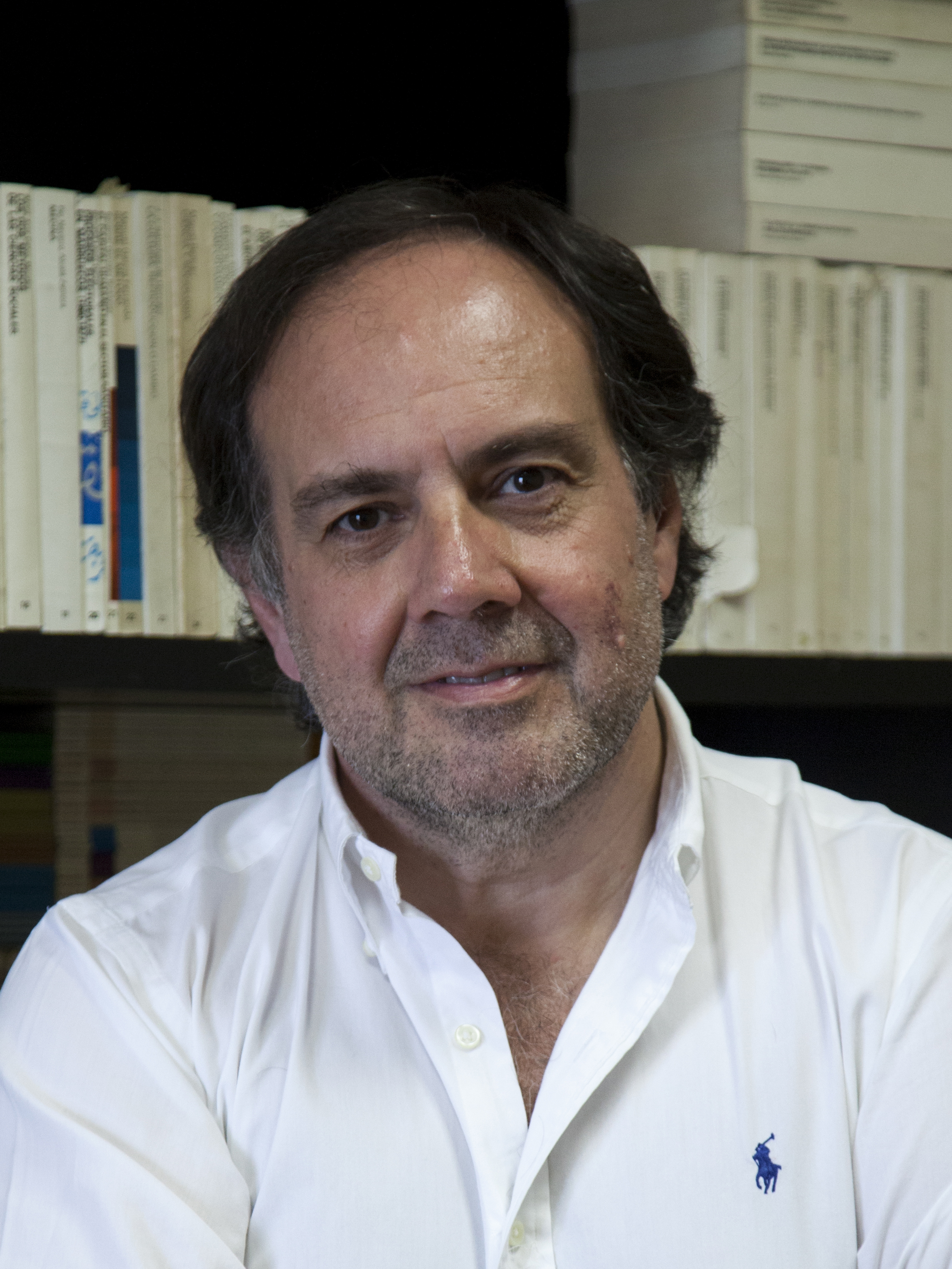
- Born: April 15, 1964; Burgos, Spain
- Education: Complutense University
- Occupations: Professor, Consultant & Researcher
- Organization(s): Professor at University of Murcia, Spain
- Awards: Honorary Professor; Comendador of the Order of the Southern Cross; Order with plate of the Civil Order of Alfonso X, the Wise
- Website: Official website

Ismael Crespo Martínez is a political scientist and expert in Latin America, Professor of Political science at the University of Murcia, Spain, and director of the Department of Political Science and Administration at the same university. In addition, he runs MásPoderLocal, a digital magazine on political communication and electoral behavior focused on Spain and Latin America. Since 2012, he is the president of the Latin American Association of Electoral Campaign Researchers (ALICE).

== Career ==
In 1995 he obtained a PhD in Political science from Complutense University of Madrid, Spain, with the thesis directed by Manuel Alcántara Sáez Crisis and transformation of political relations in Uruguay. An analysis of the behavior of the actors in the processes of change of political regime.

Between 1997 and 1999, he was Director of Research at the Center for Sociological Research and in 2000 he was appointed Director General of Universities of the Spanish government. Later in 2002 he created and directed the Spanish Agency for Quality Assessment and University Accreditation until 2004. He has worked as a consultant for universities, institutions and regional and national governments in Spain, Argentina, Brazil, Costa Rica, Mexico, Peru, Uruguay and Venezuela. In 2016 he conducted the institutional campaign for the vote promotion in presidential and legislative Peruvian elections.

== Awards and honors ==
During his professional career, Ismael Crespo has received different distinctions, among which can be highlighted the Order with plate of the Civil Order of Alfonso X, the Wise granted by the Spanish Government, or the degree of Comendador of the Order of the Southern Cross, granted by the President Fernando H. Cardoso. He also has received the acknowledgments of higher academic level of the Peruvian Universities of Lime and César Vallejo de Trujillo, and also of two Argentine Universities: the Catholic University of Cordoba and the National University of La Rioja.

== Bibliography ==
- Crespo, I., V. Martínez, A. Mora, C. Moreno y R. Rabadán 2016. Manual de Herramientas para la Investigación de la Opinión Pública. Valencia: Tirant lo Blanch (270 páginas). ISBN 978-84-9143-184-8
- Crespo, I., O. D´Adamo, V. García Beaudoux y A. Mora Rodríguez (coords.) 2015. Diccionario Enciclopédico de Comunicación Política. Madrid: Centro de Estudios Políticos y Constitucionales (374 páginas). ISBN 978-84-259-1660-1
- Crespo, I., C. Nicolini y J. Parodi 2015. La Comunicación Interna en la Administración Pública Española. Madrid: Instituto Nacional de Administración Pública (184 páginas). ISBN 978-84-7088-976-9
- Crespo, I. (dir.) 2013. Partidos, Medios y Electores en Procesos de Cambio. Las Elecciones Generales Españolas de 2011. Valencia: Tirant Humanidades (700 páginas). ISBN 978-84-15731-32-0
- Crespo, I., A. Garrido, I. Carletta y M. Riorda 2011: Manual de Comunicación Política y Estrategias de Campaña. Candidatos, Medios y Electores en una Nueva Era. Buenos Aires: Biblos (265 páginas). ISBN 978-950-786-892-4
- Anduiza, E., I. Crespo y M. Méndez 2009: Metodología de la Ciencia Política, 2ª edición revisada, 1ª reimpresión 2011, Madrid: CIS (146 páginas). ISBN 978-84-7476-480-2
- Crespo, I., A. Garrido y M. Riorda 2008: La Conquista del Poder. Elecciones y Campañas Presidenciales en América Latina. Buenos Aires: La Crujía (269 páginas). ISBN 9789876010641
- Crespo, I. y A. Garrido 2008: Elecciones y Sistemas Electorales Presidenciales en América Latina. México DF: Porrúa (238 páginas). ISBN 9789708190428
- Crespo, I. y A. Martínez 2005 (eds.): Política y Gobierno en América Latina. Valencia: Tirant lo Blanch (455 páginas). ISBN 8484563154
- Crespo, I. 2003 (ed.): Partidos, Medios de Comunicación y Electores. Buenos Aires: Planeta (279 páginas). ISBN 9504911420
- Crespo, I. et al. 2003: Métodos e Técnicas para a Pesquisa Electoral. Río Grande do Soul (Brasil): EDUCAT (146 páginas). ISBN 8575900099
- Crespo, I. 2002: Tres Décadas de Política Uruguaya. Crisis, Restauración y Transformación del Sistema de Partidos. Madrid: CIS/Siglo XXI (214 páginas). ISBN 8474763274

== See also ==
- Departamento de Ciencia Política y de la Administración, University of Murcia
- Ismael Crespo, official website
- ALICE, official website
- MasPoderLocal, official website
