= Luis Nardín Rivas =

Bolivian politician

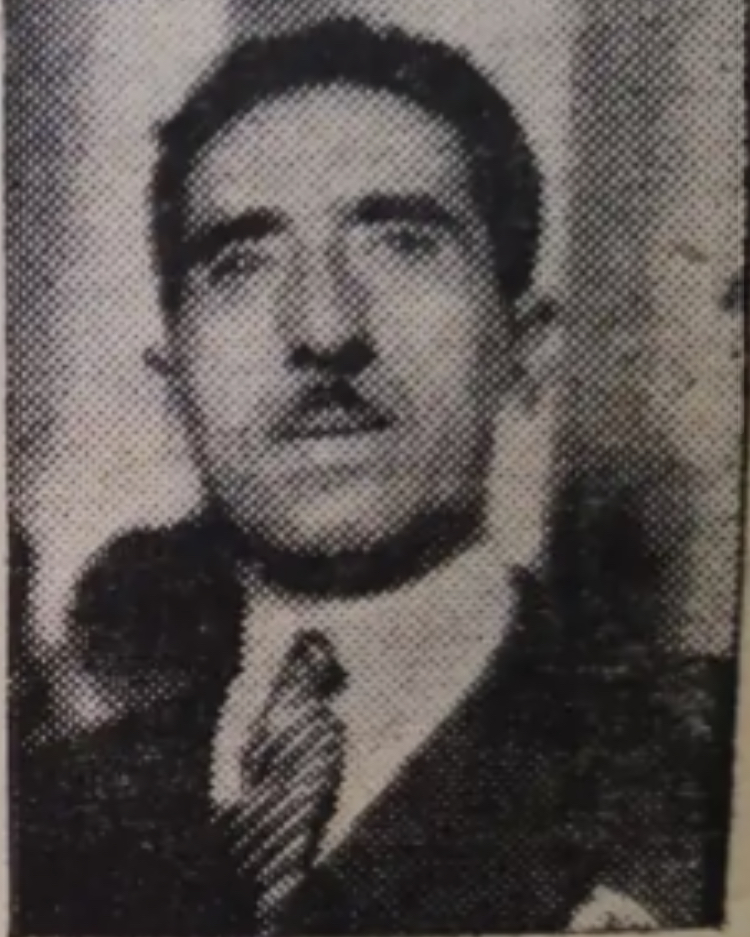
- Luis Nardín in exile.

Mayor of La Paz
- In office 2 May 1942 – 3 May 1943
- Preceded by: Humberto Muñoz Cornejo
- Succeeded by: Federico Gutiérrez Granier
- In office 2 February 1948 – 4 March 1950
- Preceded by: Humberto Frías
- Succeeded by: Eduardo Sáenz García

Minister of National Economy
- In office 10 April 1950 – 5 May 1951
- President: Mamerto Urriolagoitía
- Preceded by: Egberto Ergueta Quiroga
- Succeeded by: Juan Manuel Crespo Lugo

Personal details
- Born: December 19, 1900 La Paz, Bolivia
- Died: July 13, 1961 Lima, Peru
- Spouse: Mercedes Ergueta
- Children: 3
- Parent(s): Julio Nardín; María Rivas

Luis Nardín Rivas (19 December 1900 – 13 July 1961) was a Bolivian politician who served as Mayor of La Paz twice; (1942–1943) and (1948–1950). He was a prominent politician during the final stages of the oligarchic Republic of Bolivia and an ally of the old elite. After his second term ended, he would become Minister of National Economy (1950–1951), and would briefly work as a diplomat in the Bolivian delegation to Brazil in 1951. After the Bolivian National Revolution of 1952, he was exiled to Peru where he spent the rest of his life.

== Early life and political career ==
He was born in La Paz, on December 19, 1900, the son of Julio Nardín and María Manuela Rivas. He was educated at the University of San Francisco Xavier in Sucre where he made several connections which would later help his political career.

His political career began with his entry to the Chamber of Deputies in 1920. This was the same year that president José Gutiérrez Guerra was ousted by a civilian-led coup that Nardín Rivas supported. During his time in the Chamber of Deputies, he largely sided with the Saavedrista government and opposed the military socialist governments of Germán Busch and Gualberto Villarroel. Later, when the oligarchy returned to power during the "sexenio" (1946–1952), he was a staunch ally and supporter of the government. President Enrique Peñaranda would appoint Nardín Mayor of La Paz in 1942.

== Major political figure ==
It was during the "sexenio" that Nardín's career was seriously propelled to new heights. Having left the Chamber of Deputies in 1942, he rejoined once Villarroel was toppled and was a strong advocate of the development of the infrastructure of La Paz. He continued a project which he started in 1941, which called for the expansion and construction of new neighborhoods in La Paz in order to better deal with the rapid growth of the city's population.

He was elected to a second term in 1948 as Mayor of La Paz and would continue his efforts to expand La Paz and modernizing the city. However, the unstable government of Enrique Hertzog would lead to the outbreak of a so-called civil war in 1949, which damaged large parts of the city. He would be important in the efforts to repair the city.

== Minister of National Economy and downfall ==
In 1950, he would lose the mayoral elections and would again join the government. A month after, he was appointed Minister of National Economy by president Mamerto Urriolagoitía and served until 1951. However, with the country engulfed in chaos and rebellion under the leadership of the Revolutionary Nationalist Movement (RNM), he resigned. In one of Urriolagoitia's final acts as president, he sent Nardín to Brazil to serve in the Bolivian delegation there.

Hugo Ballivián, Urriolagoitia's chosen successor, was ousted less than a year later and Nardín was recalled to Bolivia. At odds with the new government led by the RNM, he left Bolivia for Peru not long after this party had taken over the country. He would spend the rest of his days in Lima, where he died eight years after the downfall of the oligarchic republic.

== Family ==
Nardín was married to Mercedes Ergueta with whom he would have three children: Julio, Martha, and Marina.
