= Juan Rivero Torres =

Bolivian businessman (1897–1951)

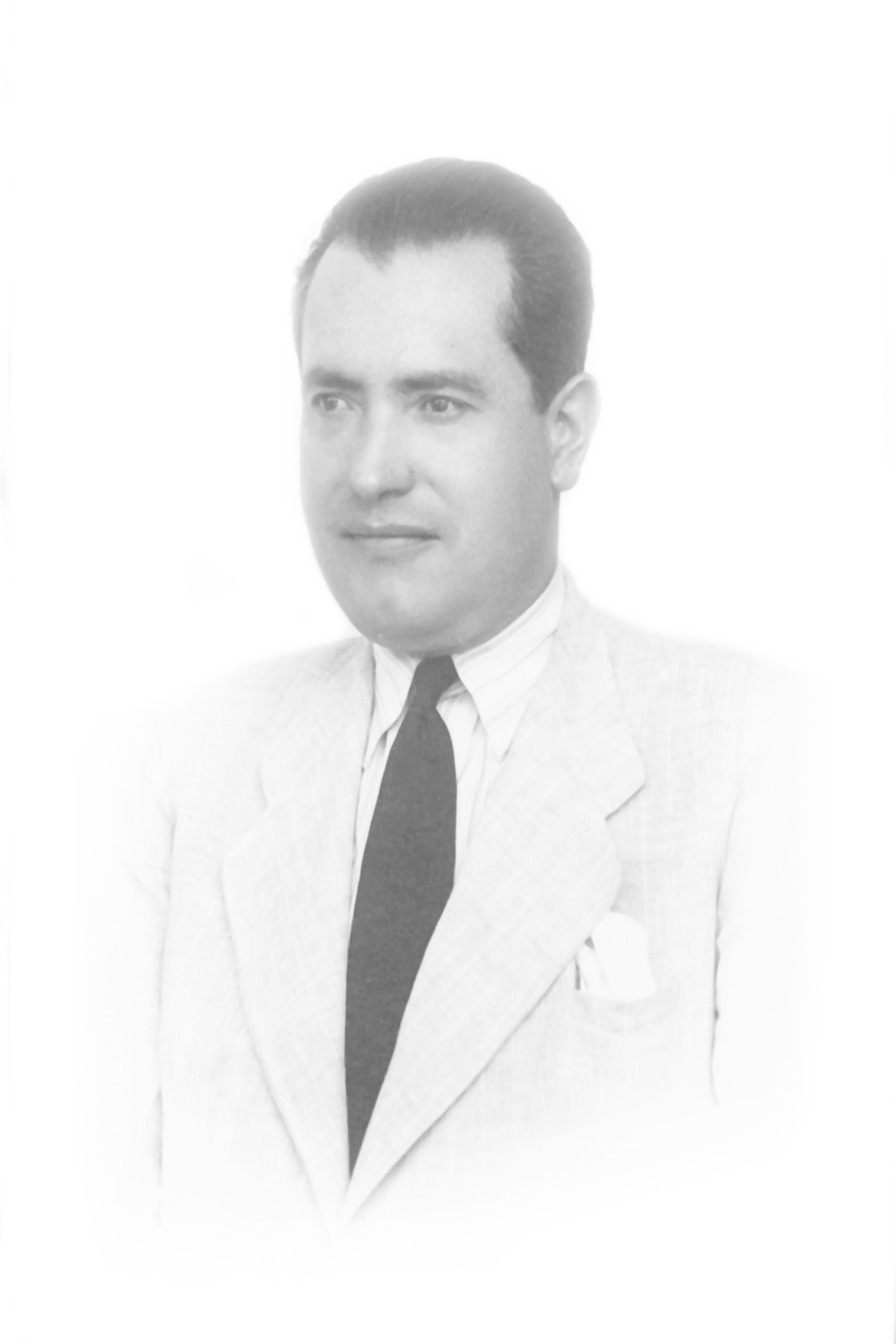
- Born: Juan Ramón Rivero Torres; January 17, 1897; Cochabamba, Bolivia
- Died: June 29, 1951 (aged 54); Buenos Aires, Argentina
- Education: ETH Zurich
- Occupations: Engineer and entrepreneur
- Spouse: María Teresa Andrea Gutierrez-Guerra Reyes Calvo de la Banda (m. 1940–1951)
- Children: María de la Gloria Rivero Gutiérrez-Guerra
- Relatives: Adela Zamudio (aunt)
- Awards: Ordem Nacional do Cruzeiro do Sul (1941)

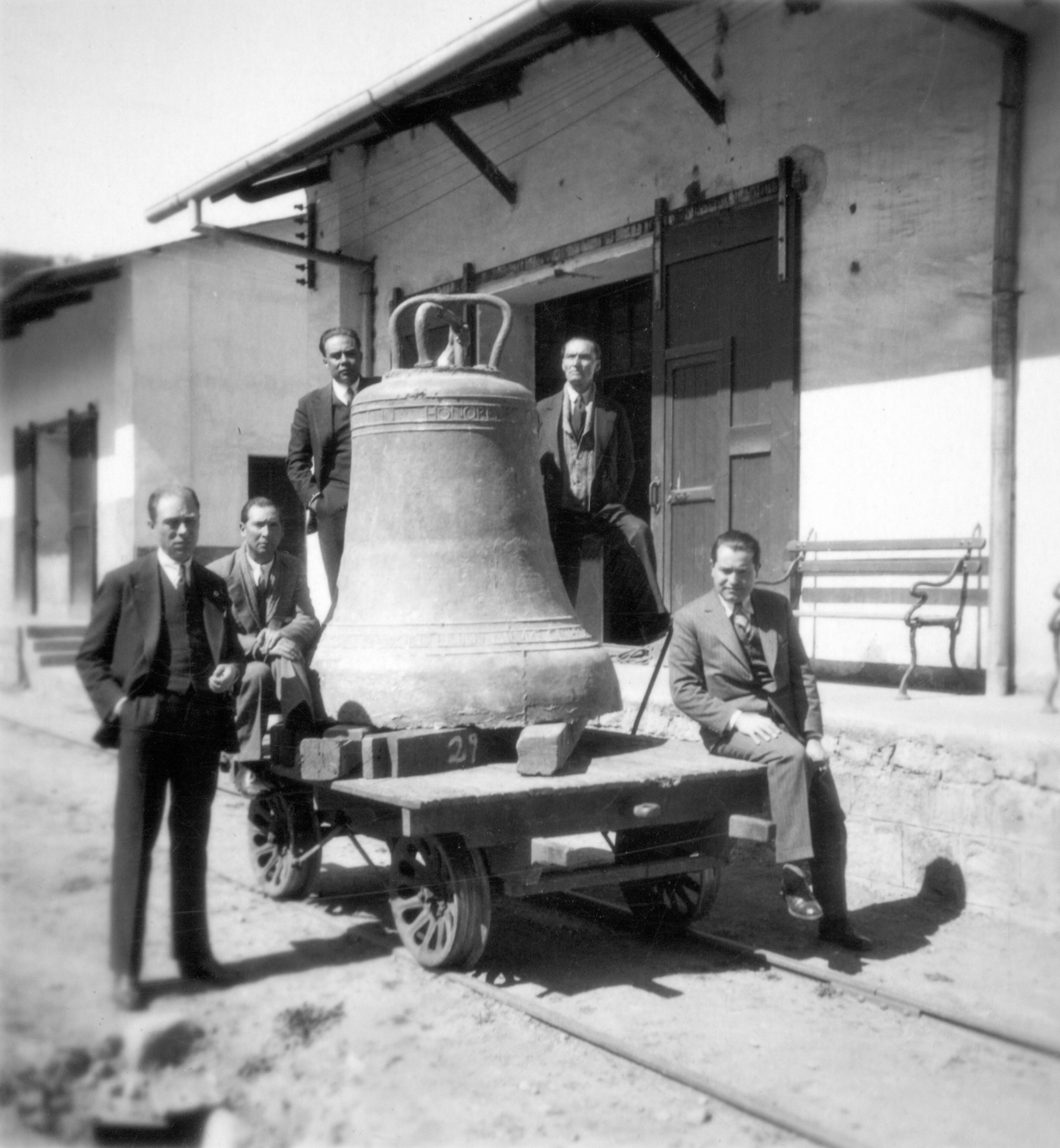
Juan Rivero Torres making a cross-country railroad ride with Bolivia's Liberty Bell in 1941

Juan Ramón Rivero Torres (January 17, 1897 – June 29, 1951), was a Bolivian engineer and businessman responsible for the development of several cross-border infrastructure projects that improved regional integration in South America during the first half of the 20th century. The completion of the railroad connecting Santa Cruz, Bolivia to Corumbá, Brazil effectively linked South America's Atlantic and Pacific coasts.

In 1941, President Getúlio Vargas awarded him with the Ordem Nacional do Cruzeiro do Sul, the highest award bestowed by the Brazilian government to a foreigner, for his services in the development of regional transport infrastructure.

== Biography ==
Born in Cochabamba, Bolivia, one of two landlocked South American countries, he was the son of industrialist Ramón Rivero and the nephew of poet Adela Zamudio. He was educated at the Swiss Federal Institute of Technology at Zurich, Switzerland, where in 1921 he received an honors degree in civil engineering. As a young engineer, he was driven and determined to address the special challenges faced by his landlocked country and help Bolivia overcome its geographical disadvantages.

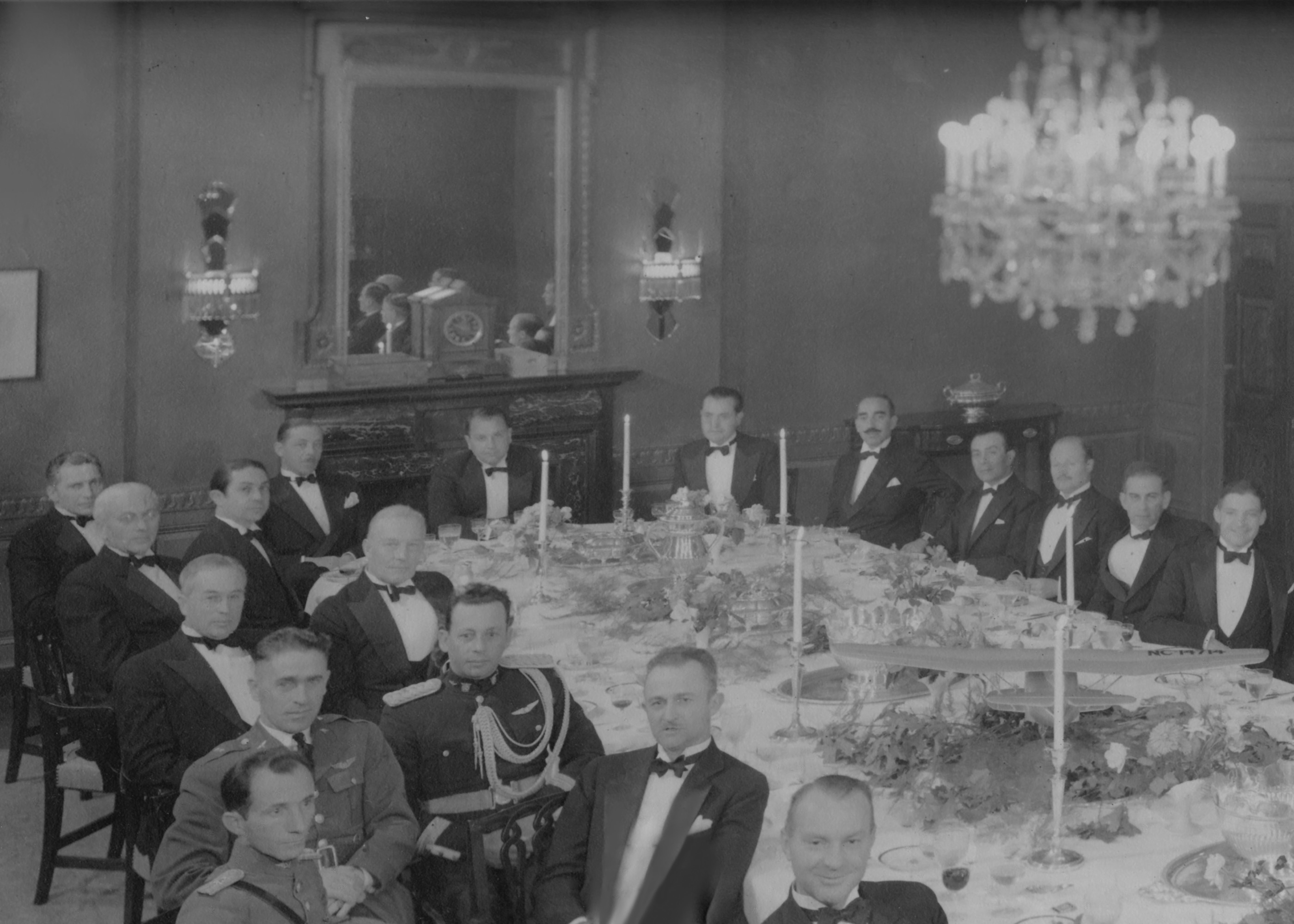
Juan Terry Trippe of Pan American World Airways hosting an official dinner in honor of Juan Rivero Torres at New York's Union League Club in 1935

=== Pan-American Highway ===
After he took part as a student in the Bolivian delegation in Geneva, Switzerland, as the initial sessions of the General Assembly of the League of Nations were called to order, President Bautista Saavedra recognized his unique diplomatic skills and sent him as an engineer to the initial meetings of the Pan-American Highway Commission, in 1924 at Washington, D.C., and the following spring of 1925, at Buenos Aires, Argentina, where he served as vice president of the commission. A modern highway from the northern part of North America to the southern part of South America had been under official consideration since 1923, when the Fifth International Conference of American States met at a Santiago, Chile. He came to believe in the project, and became an early advocate for it in Bolivia, which signed the Convention on the Pan-American Highway in 1937.

=== Lloyd Aéreo Boliviano ===
Between 1923 and 1937, he served as chief engineer of rail and air transport for the Ministry of Economic Development, where he was instrumental in the creation of Lloyd Aereo Boliviano, one of South America's oldest airlines.

=== Santa Cruz-Corumbá Railway ===
In 1938, he was appointed chief of the Bolivian delegation to help organize the Mixed Bolivian-Brazilian Railway Commission; until 1951, he served as delegate engineer of Bolivia in the construction of the Santa Cruz-Corumbá Railway, thereby forming a rail corridor to connect South America's Atlantic ports with its Pacific ones.
