= Wacław Frankowski =

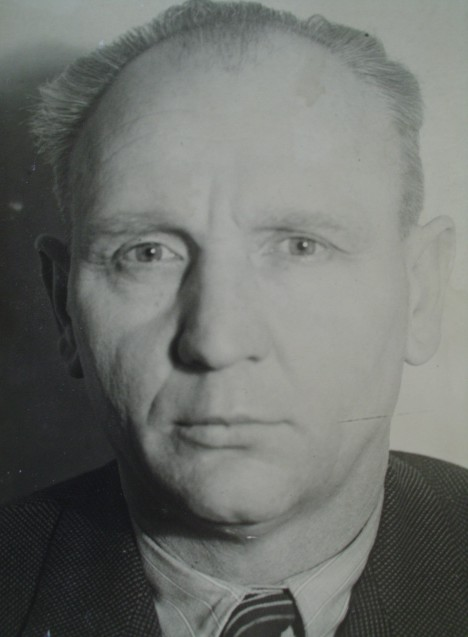
Wacław Frankowski

Wacław Frankowski ONCS (25 October 1903 – 19 March 1981) was a Polish labour activist in Łódź in the interwar period, diplomat of the Polish People's Republic from 1953 to 1956 (envoy extraordinary and the minister plenipotentiary in Brazil).

Born in Łódź in 1903, he was a weaver and a locksmith by profession. As a member of the Communist Party of Poland (KPP), at the beginning of the 1920s he became one of the leaders of the communist activists in Łódź. On 30 July 1923 he was arrested for his participation in strikes. On 2 October he was condemned by the District Court in Łódź to three years of imprisonment. After his release in 1928 he was directed by KPP to a semi-legal job at the theatre Labour Stage, whose director was Witold Wandurski. He was also active in the weavers union and in the association of freethinkers. In years 1930 – 1937 he was a labour union deputy in the factories of Kinderman and Szac, when he was arrested again and condemned for two years and seven months of imprisonment. He served his sentence in Łódź, Częstochowa and Wronki. During the German occupation he was deported as forced labour to Germany, where he worked in a mine. Having returned to Poland in 1945, he joined the Polish Workers' Party (PPR), later Polish United Workers' Party (PZPR) and until 1959 he fulfilled there the duties of the Director of the Economic Department. Subsequently, he began his career in the Polish diplomacy. From 1953 to 1956 he held the post of the envoy extraordinary and the minister plenipotentiary of PRL in Rio de Janeiro in Brazil. He prompted the advancement and signed the Polish – Brazilian trade agreement. He was awarded an Order of the Southern Cross (Grand Cross – 1st class) and a Medal of the 10th Anniversary of People's Poland.

He died in Łódź in 1981.
